= Juana Cruz =

Spanish woman bullfighter (1917–1981)

Juana Cruz de la Casa
Personal information
- Nickname: Juanita Cruz
- Nationality: Spanish
- Born: 12 February 1917 Madrid, Spain
- Died: 18 May 1981 (aged 64) Madrid, Spain
- Resting place: Cementerio de la Almudena, Madrid
- Monument: Gravesite sculpture by Luis Sanguino
- Occupation: Bullfighter
- Years active: 1932–1947
- Agent: Rafael García Antón (her apoderado)
- Spouse: Rafael García Antón

Juana Cruz de la Casa (Spanish: [ˈxwana ˈkɾuθ ðe la ˈkasa]; 12 February 1917 – 18 May 1981), also known as Juanita Cruz (Spanish: [xwaˈnita]), was a Spanish woman bullfighter, considered one of the pioneers in Spanish women's bullfighting.

== Early life ==
Even when she was a little girl, Cruz began to involve herself in the world of bulls by attending various kinds of bull spectacles, especially after moving to the Avenida Felipe II, right before the site where then stood Madrid's former Fuente del Berro bullring on the Aragón Road. She delivered her first estocada (the sword thrust meant to kill the bull) to a bull calf on 24 June 1932, when she was 15 years old, at León's bullring, and the news was published in the press, citing for the first time her full name, but the upshot from the publicity was not helpful to her: Spain's then Minister of Governance, Santiago Casares Quiroga, forbade her to fight bulls at any bullring. Even finding herself up against such difficulties, with special permission granted her by the appropriate governors, Cruz was able to present herself as a professional at the Cabra bullring on 16 April the next year, alternating with a then still unknown Manolete. That afternoon, Cruz cut two ears and two tails, and given her success, she did a repeat performance on Easter Sunday, this time alternating with Manolete and "El bebé Chico". She kept on, making the most of permission that had been granted her, and with Domingo Dominguín's backing; he contracted her to fight bulls in Murcia, Málaga, Albacete and Antequera, among other places, and she closed the season with a total of 33 bullfights.

== Legal struggles ==
Cruz's legal battle in these first few years was arduous; in 1934, she appealed to Articles 2 and 33 of the Constitution of the Republic, which safeguarded the equality of the sexes before the law and the freedom to choose one's profession, respectively. She relied on support from other bullfighters such as Marcial Lalanda. This same year, Rafael Salazar Alonso, the new Minister of Governance, authorized bullfighting by women on foot in Spain, thus abrogating Article 124 of the 1930 Policy as unconstitutional. After women's bullfighting on foot was authorized, Cruz ended the 1934 season with 53 bullfights, some in renowned bullrings such as the Maestranza in Seville, the Valencia Bullring and Vista Alegre in Bilbao. In 1935, Cruz fought a total of 45 bullfights in Spain and France, standing out in the one held on 5 May in Granada, where she alternated with Joselito de la Cal and Antoñete Iglesias. Moreover, this year saw her first performance in Madrid, at the old La Chata bullring. She would not have her first bullfight at the new Las Ventas ring until the next year, 1936, when the new business's heads set the bullfighter's début for 2 April, with bulls supplied by García Aleas's widow, and with Cruz sharing billing with El Niño de la Estrella, Miguel Cirujeda and Pascual Márquez. Magazines referred to this event by saying "a complete and honest triumph. The revelation of the bullfight. Her art triumphed over all prejudice". It was the first time in history that a woman had performed at this bullring.

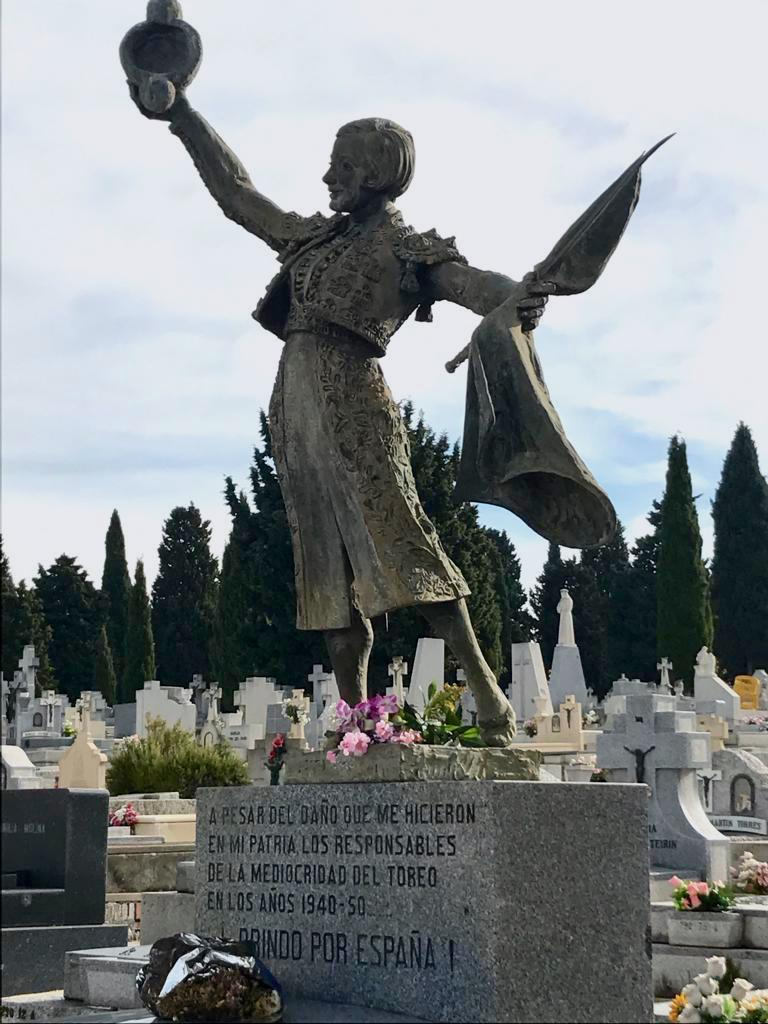
Juanita Cruz's funerary statue at the Cementerio de la Almudena

== Exile and career in the New World ==
Cruz was a Republican and she chose exile when the Spanish Civil War broke out in 1936, which put an end to her professional career in Spain. However, it was in Latin America that she met her destiny, as she had already been contracted to perform at various bullrings in Venezuela, Colombia, Peru and, later, Mexico. On 18 September 1938, she did the paseíllo (a walk round the bullring by a group of bullfighters, presenting themselves to the public) at the Toreo de Cuatro Caminos bullring in Mexico City, and then fought bull calves supplied by Carlos Cuevas Lascurain and alternating with Porfirio Sánchez and Arturo Álvarez. Given the success, Cruz appeared in billings throughout Mexico beginning in May 1938 until March 1942, and she alternated with bullfighters of such standing as Alfonso Ramírez, Calesero and Carlos Arruza. It was at the Fresnillo bullring in Zacatecas where she definitively took the alternativa, with bulls supplied by the Cerro Viejo ranch.

With the coming of Francoism, the Sindicato del Espectáculo ("Entertainment Union") reformed the standards and once again forbade women to fight bulls; therefore, Cruz was forced to keep on developing her professional career in the New World until 12 November 1944, when she suffered two serious gorings at the Santamaría Bullring in Bogotá, and her physical faculties were severely affected. She thus only performed a few more bullfighting appearances.

== Return to Spain ==
Once the Second World War had ended, Cruz travelled to France, where her exiled brother was living, and she had her last bullfight there. Later, she returned to Spain, sinking into anonymity. Throughout her professional career, she had fought in some 700 corridas. She would set herself apart from other bullfighters by wearing the customary suit of lights with a skirt, for which her fellow bullfighters criticized her, saying that she should wear the taleguilla (the traditional pants) or a rejoneadora's costume.

== Death ==
Cruz died in Madrid, as a result of an old heart wound, on 18 May 1981, and she was buried at the Cementerio de la Almudena beneath a lovely mausoleum, which is sculptor Luis Sanguino's work. Her epitaph reads: A pesar del daño que me hicieron en mi patria los responsables de la mediocridad del toreo en los años 1940–50, ¡brindo por España! ("Despite the damage done to me in my homeland by those responsible for the mediocrity of bullfighting in the years 1940–50, here's to Spain!"). Cruz's widower, Rafael García Antón, who had also been her agent, wrote a book about his wife upon her death entitled "Juanita Cruz, su odisea" ("Juanita Cruz, Her Odyssey"), which had a run of one thousand copies, which he himself bankrolled. About Cruz, writer on many subjects José María de Cossío once said "She has killed serious bulls and demonstrated remarkable skill and bravery."

== See also ==
List of female bullfighters
