= Morenito de Aranda =

Spanish bullfighter (born 1985)

Personal information
- Nickname: Morenito
- Nationality: Spanish
- Born: Jesús Martínez Barrios; 10 November 1985 (age 40) Aranda de Duero, Burgos, Spain
- Home town: Aranda de Duero
- Occupation: Bullfighter
- Years active: 1999–present
- Agent: Manolo Hurtado; José Ortega Cano; Carlos Zúñiga (the elder); Jean François Pilès (apoderados)
- Parent: Jesús Martínez (father)
- Other interests: Fighting bull husbandry

Jesús Martínez Barrios (Spanish: [xeˈsuz maɾˈtineθ ˈβarjos]; born 10 November 1985), known as Morenito de Aranda (Spanish: [moɾeˈnito ðe aˈɾanda]) is a Spanish bullfighter. Born in a small town in Burgos, he had no family background in bullfighting, but has nonetheless become a well known matador in his own country and abroad. His interests also extend to raising the very cattle that he fights at a farm that he established.

== Early life ==
Morenito was born into a family of bullfighting fans in Aranda de Duero. Even before beginning bullfighting school at the age of nine, he was showing his interest in becoming a bullfighter. He learnt the craft of tauromachy at the Escuela Taurina de Aranda. The novelty sat well with his family for a while, but as time went by, young Jesús began to take bullfighting more seriously, and his family did not much like this idea. This was especially true for Morenito's mother, to whom he once felt it needful to deliver the ultimatum "If you don't let me be a bullfighter, I'll leave home." In the end, however, his family clearly did not stand in his way, and under maestro Regino Ortés's and aficionado Lorenzo's kindly tutelage, Jesús learnt his first lessons in bullfighting.

== Activity as a novillero ==
Morenito donned the suit of lights for the first time and had his début without picadores on 30 May 1999 at Tudela de Duero in the province of Valladolid.

On 2 September 2002, Morenito had his début with picadores at the Medina del Campo bullring in the same province, cutting three ears from bull calves supplied by the Varela Crujo ranch at an engagement at which he shared billing with Martín Quintana and Joselito Campos. That same year, on 12 October, he fought more calves at the Laguna del Duero bullring, also in the province of Valladolid, where he reaped six ears.

In 2003, Morenito travelled to Latin America to make his début at the Plaza de toros de Quito in Ecuador, where he cut one ear. He later spent the European bullfighting season plying his trade at various Spanish and French bullrings.

On 6 June 2004, Morenito presented himself at Las Ventas, the main bullring in Madrid, at the Feria de San Isidro ("Saint Isidore's Fair" — a yearly event at Las Ventas), fighting a yearling bull named Cervato ("Young Fawn") from the El Ventorrillo ranch, alternating with Miguel Ángel Perera and Ismael López. Then, on 20 June, came his presentation at the Maestranza in Seville with yearlings from the Gabriel Rojas ranch.

Come winter that year, Morenito was once again off to Quito after the last winter's triumph, and once again, he cut one ear.

in the 2005 bullfighting season, which would see Morenito invested as a matador (he was at the season's beginning still a novillero), he appeared at bullfighting engagements at both Las Ventas in Madrid, on 19 March, and the Maestranza in Seville, on 24 April. On 13 March, he was awarded one ear in Valencia. On 25 March, he found himself at a corrida at the amphitheatre in Arles in the south of France, where he reaped another ear, as he did once again at the Murcia bullring.

== Activity as a matador ==
On 14 May 2005, Morenito took his alternativa at the Valladolid bullring. Standing as "godfather" was Salvador Vega, while José María Manzanares bore witness to this important occasion in the young bullfighter's professional life. The bull that he fought for his alternativa was Extraviado, who had been brought to Valladolid from the José Luis Marca ranch. Morenito left him earless.

On 17 September 2006, Morenito was performing on home ground, at the Aranda de Duero bullring, reaping four ears from bulls that had been supplied by the Victoriano del Río ranch. Later, on 30 December, he made his début as a matador in the New World at the Cañaveralejo bullring in Cali, Colombia, on which occasion he again cut one ear.

On 16 September 2007, Morenito fought bulls for the very first time at La Monumental, the bullring in Barcelona. He reaped one ear from a bull bearing the El Sierro brand. On 9 October, he was on the bill at the Plaza de Toros de Zaragoza, facing bulls from the Baltasar Ibán ranch. it was the bullfighter's last appearance that season.

On 4 May 2008, Morenito saw his alternativa confirmed at Las Ventas. Once again standing as "godfather" was Salvador Vega, while the Colombian bullfighter Luis Bolívar bore witness. The bull used for the occasion was named Tenderillo, from the San Martín ranch. For his efforts, the bullfighter was allowed one round of the bullfighting ground (ruedo). This same year, he had three further afternoons at Las Ventas, during San Isidro, on 15 August, and at the Autumn Fair.

In 2009, Morenito had two bullfighting afternoons at Las Ventas. On 27 December, he saw his alternativa confirmed once again, this time at the Monumental bullring in Mexico City, fighting a bull named Setenta Años ("Seventy Years") from the San Miguel ranch. Standing as "godfather" this time was Humberto Flores, and bearing witness was Pedro Gutiérrez Lorenzo "El Capea". A week later, on 3 January 2010, he once again appeared at a Mexican engagement and reaped one ear from a bull raised at the Santa María de Xalpa ranch. Later that year, on 8 July, back in Spain, at Pamplona's Monumental bullring, he was fighting bulls of the Cebada Gago brand, and then on 2 October, at his second appearance that year at Las Ventas, he cut one ear from a bull from the Torrealta ranch.

On 7 August 2011, Morenito fought bulls for the last time at the Monumental bullring in Barcelona, reaping one ear from a bull supplied by the Carlos Charro ranch.

On 21 May 2012, Morenito cut an ear off a bull from the Carmen Segovia ranch in Madrid.

Almost a year later, on 2 May 2013, and at the same venue (Las Ventas), Morenito cut an ear off a bull from the El Cortijillo ranch. On 14 September 2014, he shut himself in with six bulls to fight them by himself. There were two bulls each from the Juan Pedro Domecq, Torrealta, and Núñez del Cuvillo ranches. This occasion rewarded him with six ears.

On 2 May 2015, in the traditional corrida goyesca, Morenito saw the great gate open for him (leading to a triumphant trip out through it on a fellow bullfighter's shoulders) after he had left an extraordinary bull from the Montealto ranch earless. In a very rare event, on 29 August at the Iniesta bullring (in the province of Cuenca), he spared a bull from the French Aimé Gallon et fils ranch in a process known as an indulto. Rare as this is, though, Morenito granted another bull, from the Victoriano del Río ranch, an indulto less than a month later, on 19 September in the bullfighter's hometown, Aranda de Duero.

After some years' absence from the Maestranza, Morenito appeared once again in Seville on 13 April 2016, fighting bulls bearing the Victorino Martín brand, and later on, on 12 May, he cut an ear off a bull from the El Ventorrillo ranch after slaying him, in Madrid.

Morenito once again shut himself in with six bulls to fight them by himself on 25 June 2017, this time at the Coliseum Burgos and with bulls supplied by the Adolfo Martín Andrés ranch. He reaped two ears, and was borne out shoulder-high through the main gate. On 23 September, he left a bull from the El Tajo y La Reina ranch tailless at the bullring in Talavera de la Reina, in the province of Toledo.

Just over a year later, on 25 September 2018, Morenito granted his third indulto, at the bullring in Madridejos, in the province of Toledo. The lucky bull was Murga from the Victorino Martín ranch, from whom the bullfighter was awarded both ears and the tail — albeit in symbolic form.

In the 2019 bullfighting season, Morenito began at the Plaza de toros de La Flecha in Arroyo de la Encomienda before bulls bred at the Victorino Martín ranch, later performing on two afternoons at Las Ventas.

The 2020 bullfighting season was severely affected – as were many things – by the COVID-19 pandemic, and thus, Morenito only fought in two corridas that year. The first was on 19 July at the Ávila bullring before bulls from the Adolfo Martín Andrés ranch, and the other was at the Estepona bullring in the province of Málaga as part of the Gira de Reconstrucción (a programme aimed at supporting bullfighting at the height of the pandemic), where he shared billing with Emilio de Justo and fought bulls from the La Quinta ranch.

Bullfighting nevertheless rebounded from the strictures imposed on it by circumstances that arose to protect public health from the coronavirus, with Morenito appearing at 11 corridas in 2021 (which brought him a crop of 13 ears), 8 in 2022 (10 ears and one tail), and 13 in 2023 (21 ears and one tail). The 2023 bullfighting season was not altogether uneventful for Morenito. While fighting a bull at the Vic-Fezensac bullring on 30 May that year, he was badly gored through to the bone by his opponent, the bull's horn having come right near the bullfighter's lung. Within a week, though, Morenito was talking about returning to the bullring.

Morenito emerged triumphant at a corrida held in Dax in the south of France on 16 August 2024. He appeared only as a substitute, after Tristán Barroso's alternativa was cancelled. The bulls were laid on by the Victoriano del Río ranch, and with one exception – Morenito's second bull that afternoon – were held to be somewhat disappointing. Not only did he reap two ears at this engagement, but he was also borne out the main gate on shoulders for his efforts.

== Bull farm ==
In 2012, Morenito established his own ganadería brava, that is, a farm where Spanish Fighting Bulls are raised. It lies in the municipality of Riaza in the province of Segovia. His herd grazes on the farm owned by businesswoman and retired novillera Purificación Linares Juárez. The farm goes by the name Toros de Castilla.
