= 1971 Pan American Games =

6th edition of the Pan American Games

VI Pan American Games
- Host: Cali, Colombia
- Nations: 32
- Athletes: 2,935
- Events: 169 in 18 sports
- Opening: 30 July
- Closing: 13 August
- Opened by: President Misael Pastrana Borrero
- Main venue: Estadio Olímpico Pascual Guerrero

The 1971 Pan American Games, officially known as the VI Pan American Games (Spanish: VI Juegos Panamericanos) – commonly referred to as Cali 1971 – were held in Cali, Colombia, from 30 July to 13 August 1971. A total of 2,935 athletes from 32 countries participated in 17 sports.

== Host city selection ==
Three cities submitted bids to host the 1971 Pan American Games that were recognized by the Pan American Sports Organization. On 22 July 1967, Cali was selected over Santiago and Champ, Missouri by a vote of 12 to 11 to 6, respectively, by PASO at its general assembly, held at the Manitoba Medical College in Winnipeg, Canada, to host the VI Pan American Games.

== Participating nations ==
- Netherlands Antilles
- Argentina
- Bahamas
- Barbados
- Bermuda
- Bolivia
- Brazil
- British Honduras (BIZ)
- Canada
- Chile
- Colombia
- Costa Rica
- Cuba
- Dominican Republic
- El Salvador
- Ecuador
- Guatemala
- Guyana
- Haiti
- Jamaica
- Mexico
- Nicaragua
- Panama
- Paraguay
- Peru
- Puerto Rico
- Suriname
- Trinidad and Tobago
- Uruguay
- United States
- Venezuela
- Virgin Islands

== Sports ==
- Athletics
- Baseball
- Basketball
- Boxing
- Cycling
- Diving
- Equestrian
- Fencing
- Field hockey
- Football
- Gymnastics
- Rowing
- Sailing
- Shooting
- Swimming
- Synchronized swimming
- Volleyball
- Water polo
- Weightlifting
- Wrestling

== Venues ==
The main stadium was the Cali Olympic Stadium. Some events were held in the Coliseo El Pueblo. Boxing was staged in the Plaza de Toros Cañaveralejo, a Cali bullring. Some complaints were made about the barracks-style housing, which was woefully overcrowded. In an effort to protect the athletes from students who had protested the amount of money that Colombia was spending on the games, security-minded officials surrounded the athletes' village with barbed wire and guards carrying rifles. The overcrowding caused it to be dubbed "Claustrophobia Manor" by the athletes. Other concerns centered on mosquitoes, the altitude, faulty plumbing, dysentery and pickpockets.

== Medal count ==
To sort this table by nation, total medal count, or any other column, click on the icon next to the column title.

Rank	Nation	Gold	Silver	Bronze	Total
1	United States	105	74	39	218
2	Cuba	30	49	26	105
3	Canada	19	20	42	81
4	Brazil	9	7	14	30
5	Mexico	7	11	23	41

Preceded by Winnipeg	VI Pan American Games; Cali (1971)	Succeeded by Mexico City
