= Plaza de Toros, Calatayud =

Bullring in Calatayud, Spain

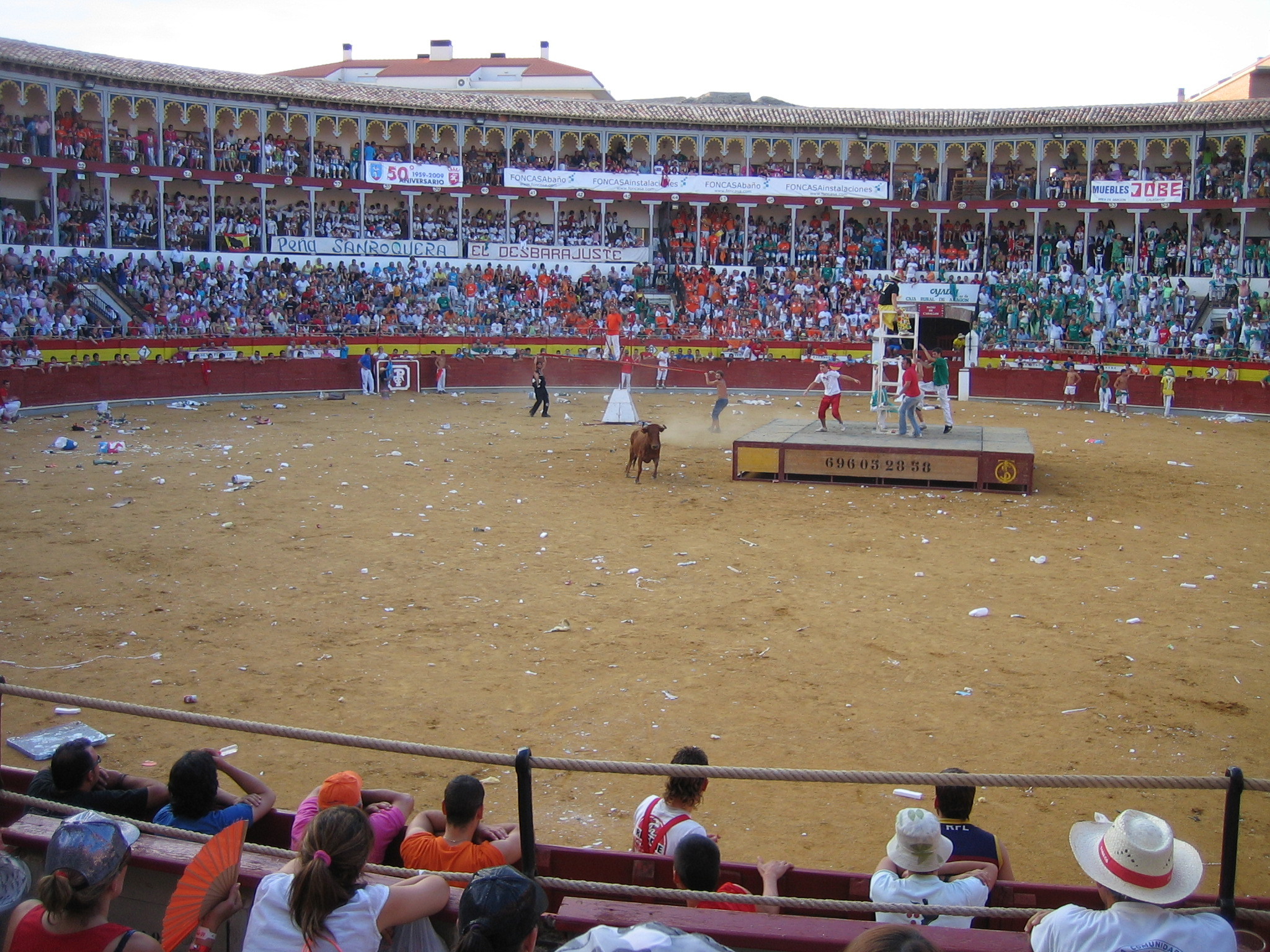

The Plaza de Toros de Calatayud is a bullring located at the Paraje de Margarita on the Calle Barón de Warsage, in the city of Calatayud, within the Province of Zaragoza in the region of Aragon, northeastern Spain.

== History ==
The site of Calatayud's former market place had been the locale for the celebration of festivals and bullfights. In the 1870s it was decided to formalize the arena, and have the proceeds from it go to the Hospicio (Hospice) of the town. Construction began on April 23 and was completed by September 9, 1877 under the direction of the architect of Mariano Medarde.

== Present day ==
The octagonal ring has a capacity for 8830 spectators on three floors. It has stables for 30 horses, and 3 corrals.

Bullfights typically take place in August and September, respectively during the Fiestas de San Roque and Fiestas de la Virgen de la Peña.
