= Charf Hill =

Hill in Tangier, Morocco

- هضبة الشرف
- Location within Morocco

Highest point
- Elevation: 93 m (305 ft)
- Coordinates: 35°45′57″N 05°47′22″W

Geography
- Location: Morocco
- Parent range: Rif

Climbing
- First ascent: Unknown
- Easiest route: From Tangier

Charf Hill (Arabic: هضبة الشرف), also known by its French name Colline du charf, is a hill in Tangier, northern Morocco. Its elevation is 93 metres above sea level and it overlooks the city between the Mediterranean and the Atlantic.

== Description ==
The hill offers a panoramic view of Tangier and the coastline from Cape Malabata in the east to La Montagne in the west. Charf Hill has a number of high-rise buildings and towards the foot of the hill are some of the poor residential districts of Tangier and the Plaza de Toros. The Syrian Mosque of Tangier is also located on the hill and is noted for its style of minaret, rare to the region.

Legend says that Charf Hill is the burial place of the massive body of Antaeus after he was defeated by Hercules.
