= Plaza de Toros de El Bibio =

El Bibio
- Plaza de Toros de El Bibio
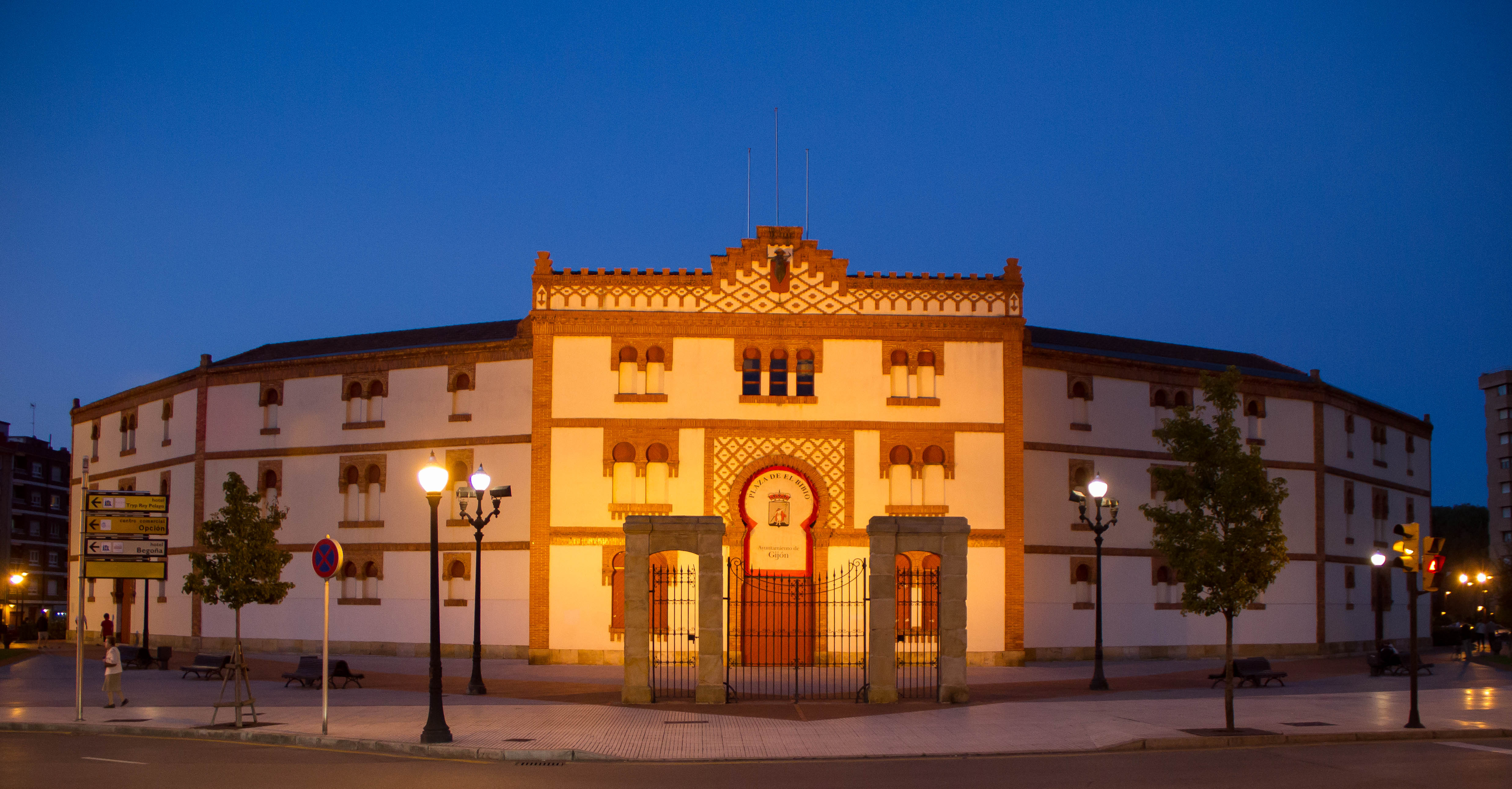
- Façade of El Bibio bullring at night
- Interactive map of the El Bibio area

General information
- Type: Bullring
- Architectural style: Neo-Mudéjar
- Location: c/ Ezcurdia, 33203 Gijón, Gijón, Asturias, Spain
- Coordinates: 43°32′07.7″N 05°38′43.9″W
- Current tenants: Circuitos Taurinos
- Construction started: 1886
- Completed: 1888
- Inaugurated: August 12, 1888; 137 years ago
- Renovated: 1997
- Owner: Gijón City Hall

Dimensions
- Diameter: 50 m (160 ft)

Design and construction
- Architect: Ignacio de Velasco
- Other designers: Carlos Velasco Peyronnet

Other information
- Seating capacity: 9,258

Spanish Cultural Heritage
- Official name: Plaza de Toros de El Bibio
- Type: Non-movable
- Criteria: Monument
- Designated: 1992
- Reference no.: RI-51-0007222

The Plaza de Toros de El Bibio is a bullring located in Gijón, Asturias, Spain.

Situated in the neighbourhood of El Bibio, it was inaugurated on August 12, 1888, with a bullfighting with Luis Mazzantini and Rafael Guerra, Guerrita.

The bullring was partially destroyed between July and August 1936, in the context of Spanish Civil War. In August 1937, after the city was taken by the Nationalist faction, Francoist troops used its ruins as a temporary concentration camp for Republican prisoners.

It was renovated in 1997. On March 20, 1992, it was declared Bien de Interés Cultural.

Apart from bullfighting, the ring is also used for music concerts.

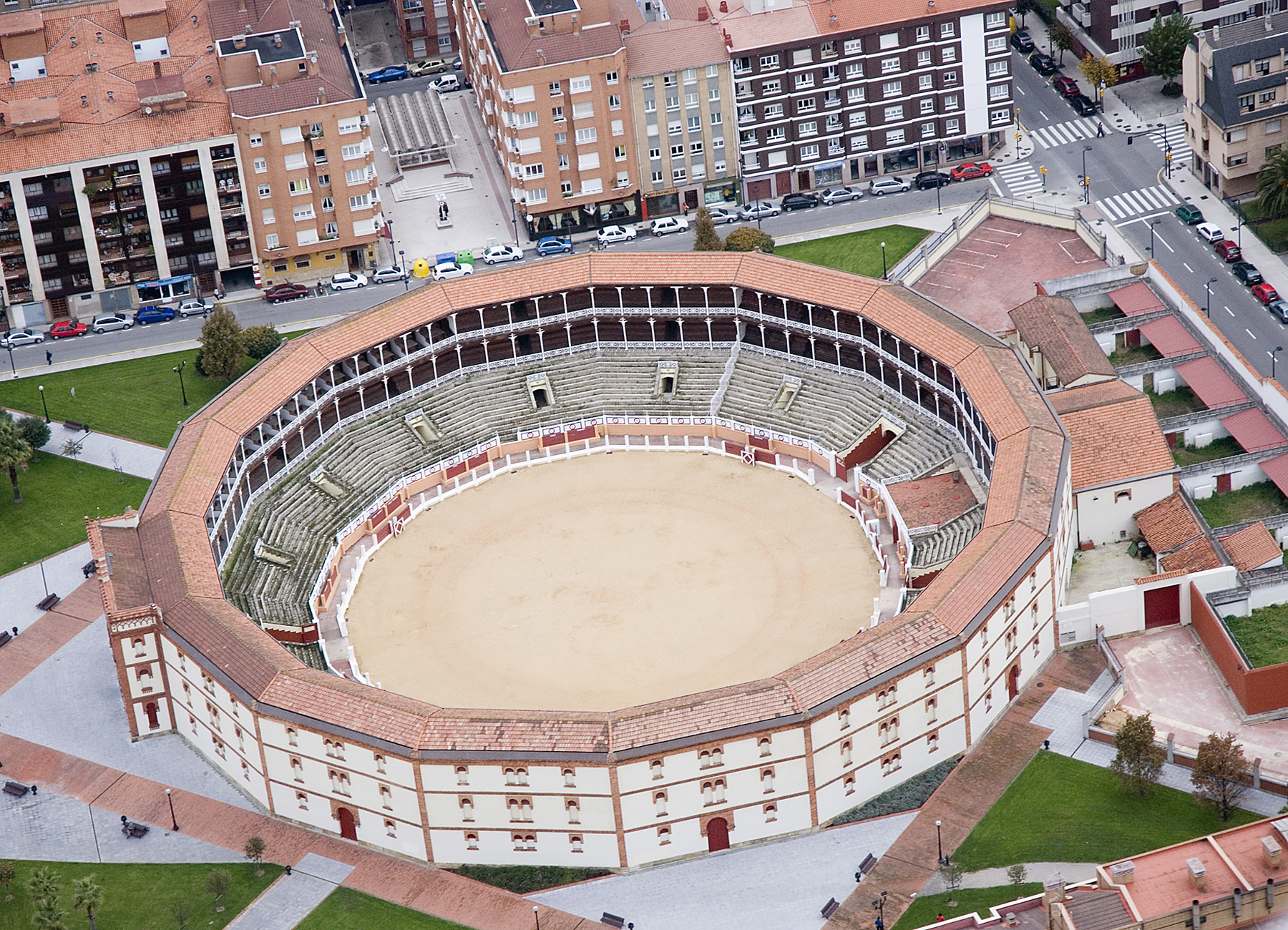
Aerial view of the bullring

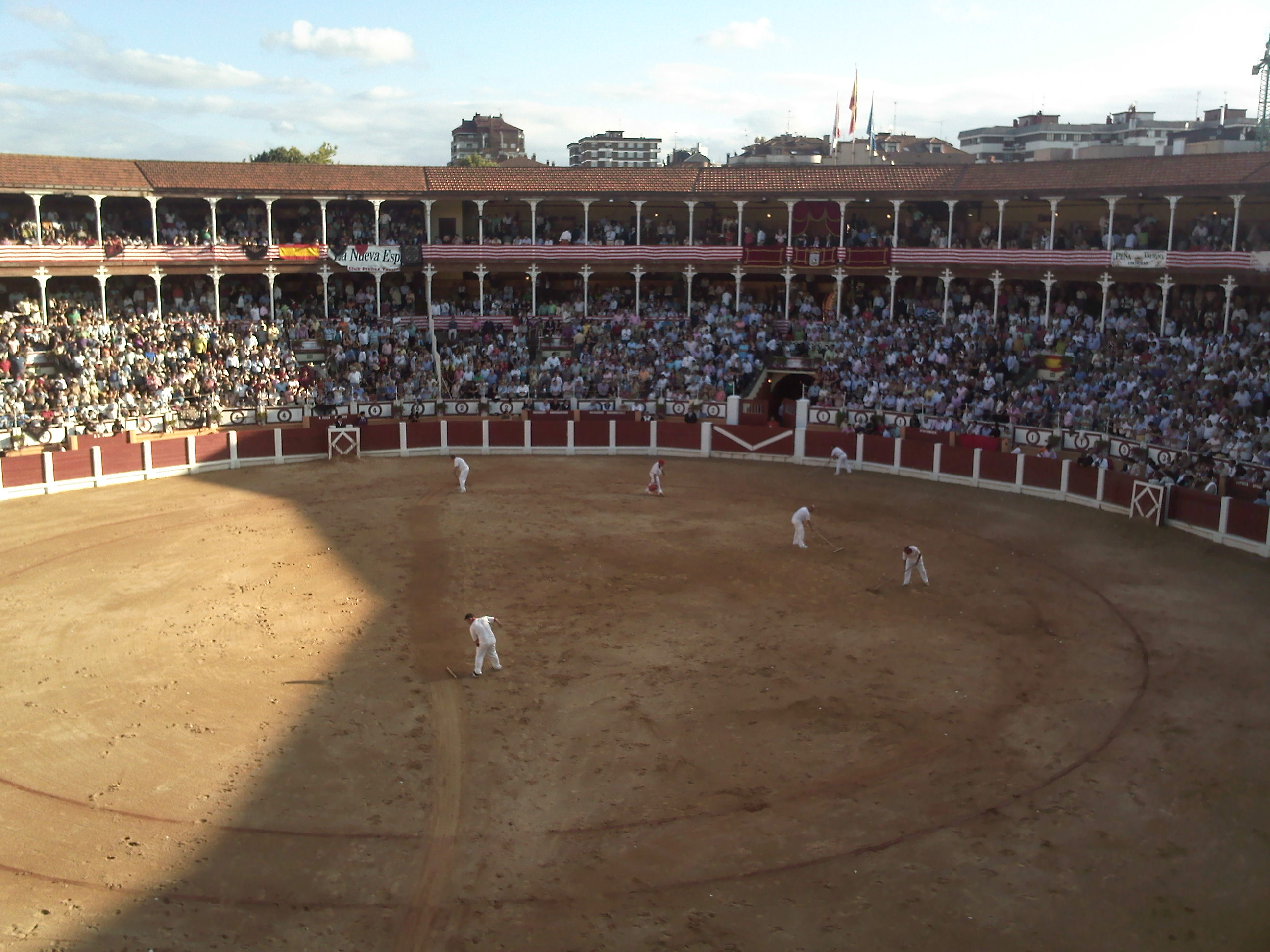
El Bibio, during a corrida
