= Plaza de Toros de Jaén =

Bullring in Jaén, Spain

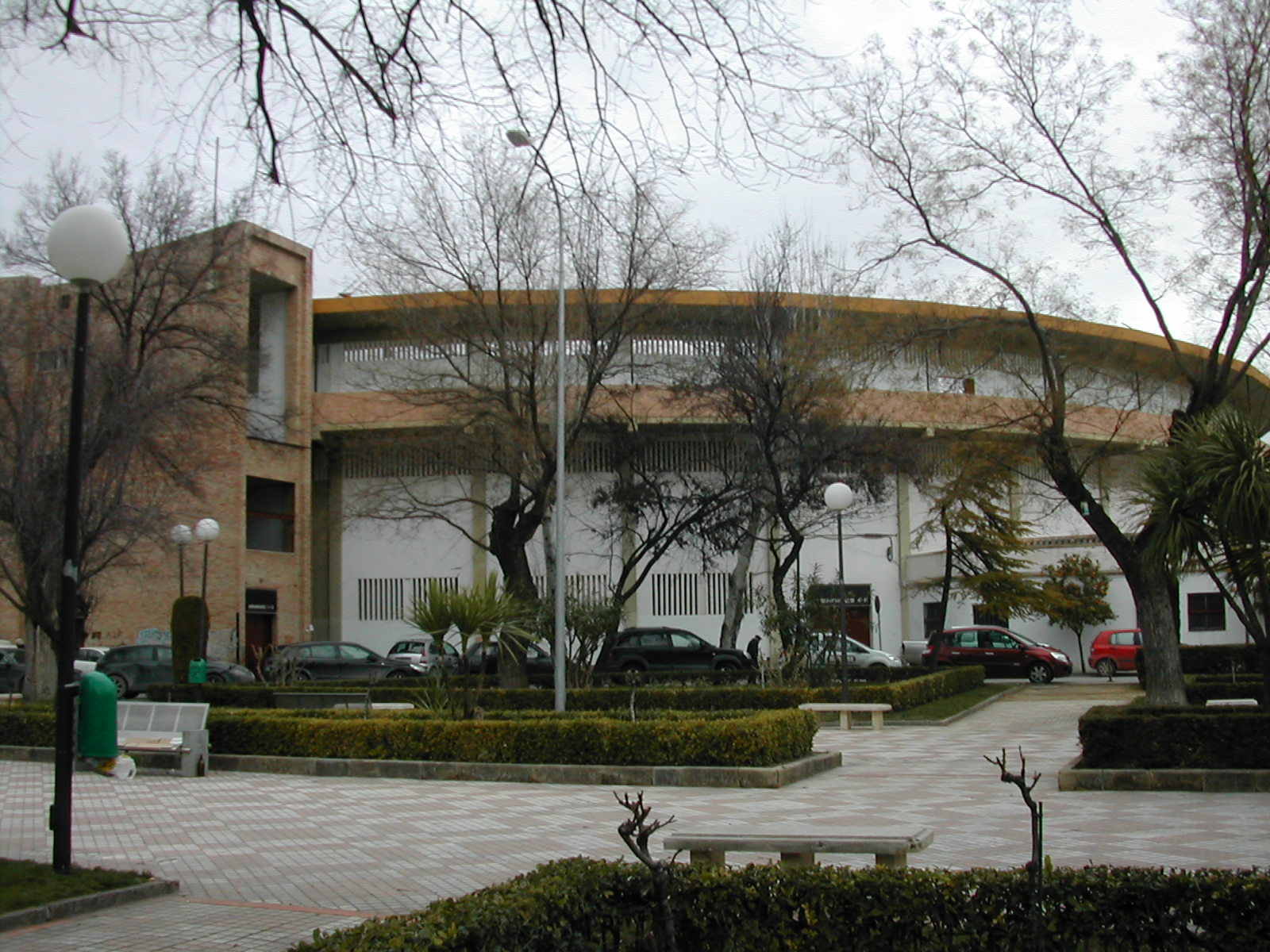
- Interactive map of Plaza de Toros de Jaén
- Full name: Plaza de Toros de Jaén
- Location: Jaén, Spain
- Coordinates: 37.7674°N 3.7833°W
- Capacity: 10,500

Construction
- Opened: October 18, 1961

Plaza de Toros de Jaén is a bullring in Jaén, Spain. It is currently used for bull fighting. The stadium holds 10,500 people. It was built in 1960.
