= Plaza de Toros del Retiro =

19th century arena

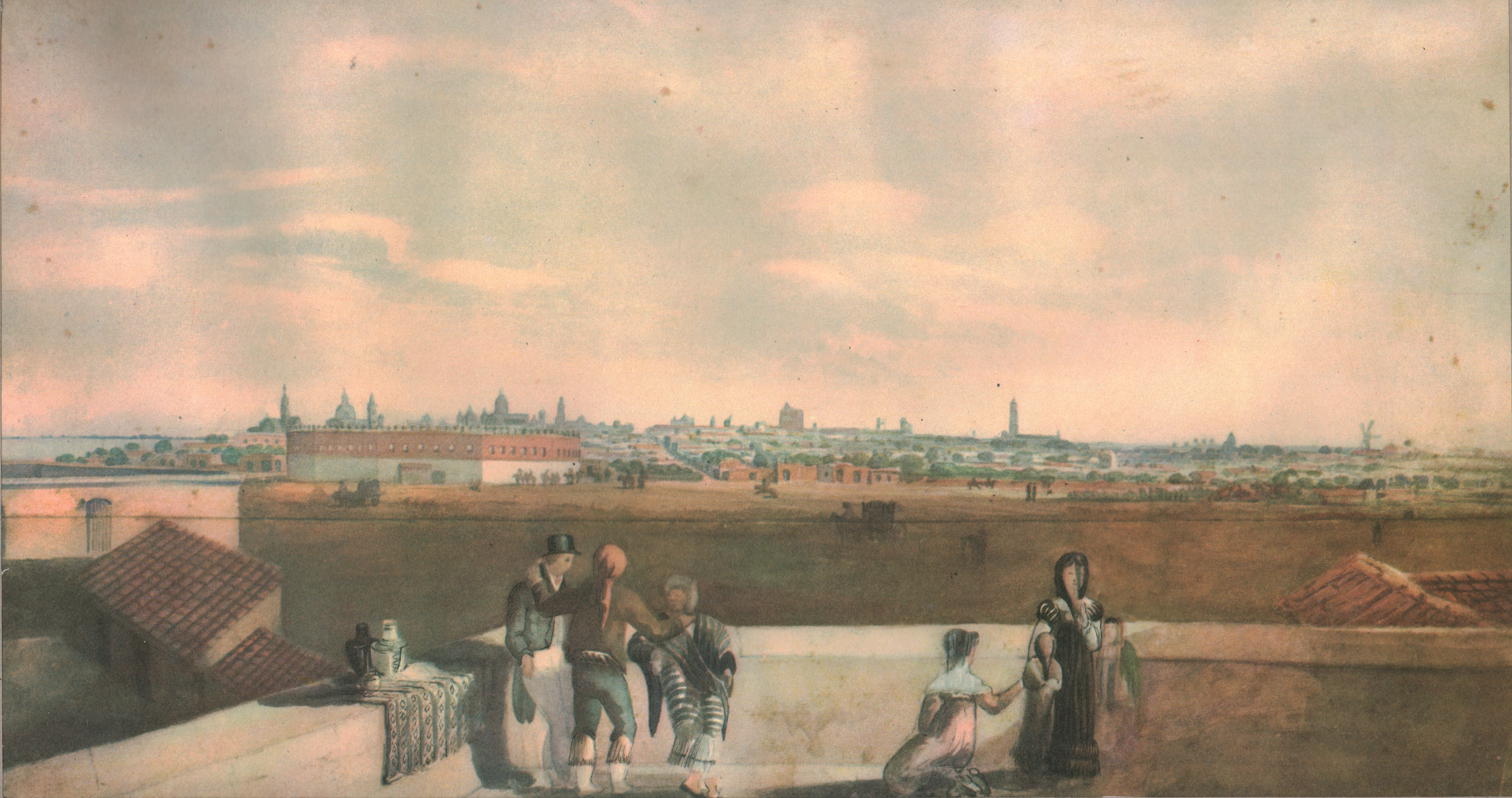
- Vista General de Buenos Aires desde la Plaza de Toros by Emeric Essex Vidal
- Location: Retiro, Buenos Aires
- Owner: Viceroyalty of the Río de la Plata – until 1810
- Capacity: 9,000

Construction
- Opened: 1801
- Closed: 1818
- Architect: Francisco Cañete

Plaza de Toros del Retiro was a bullfighting coliseum of Buenos Aires of the 19th century. This Arena was established in the city during the last years of the colonial period.

== History ==
The Plaza de Toros del Retiro was made by the architect Francisco Cañete, and its construction was completed on June 25, 1801. The Auditorium was built octagonally, with capacity for 9,000 people, was inaugurated on October 14, 1801, on the occasion of the celebration of the birthday of the Prince of Asturias Don Ferdinand.

The Plaza de Toros del Retiro was the successor of the Plaza de Toros de Montserrat, inaugurated in 1791, and closed in 1800. This property was located in the current Plaza San Martín, on land that belonged to Miguel de Riglos, and later the Asiento de Inglaterra, a branch in Buenos Aires of the South Sea Company. During the English invasions, the bullring was taken by the troops of Whitelocke, being also the scene of the Battle of the Retiro, between the troops of Santiago de Liniers and Samuel Auchmuty.

After establishing the prohibition of bullfighting in Buenos Aires, the Retiro bullring was demolished by order of the Supreme Director José Rondeau in 1819.
