= Praça de Toiros de Albufeira =

Bullring in Albufeira, Portugal

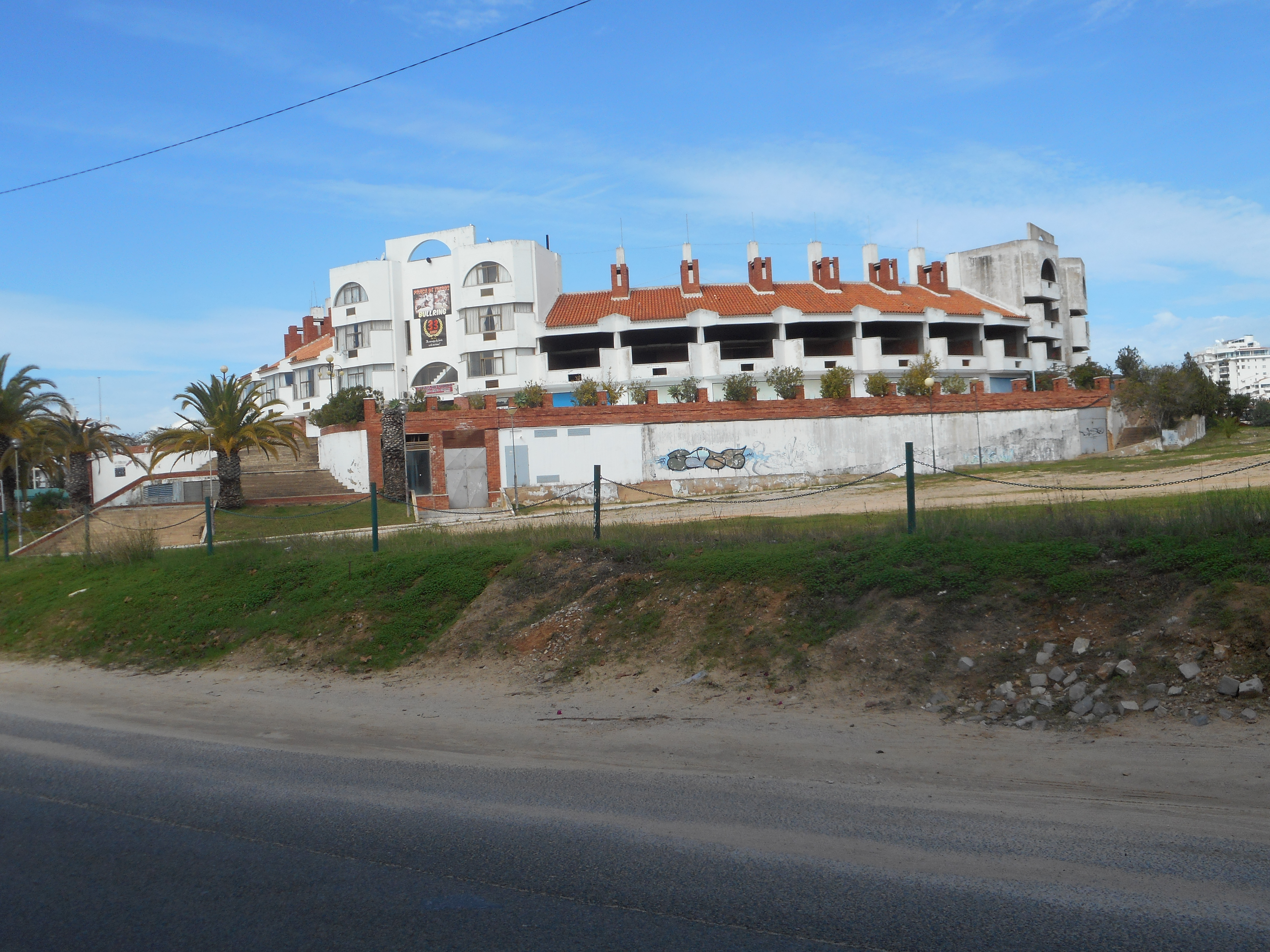
- Albufeira Bullring in 2015.
- Interactive map of the Praça de Toiros de Albufeira area

General information
- Type: Bullring
- Location: Albufeira, Portugal
- Coordinates: 37°5′41.8″N 8°13′31.7″W
- Construction started: 1982
- Opening: 1982; 44 years ago

Albufeira Bullring (Portuguese: Praça de Toiros de Albufeira) is a bullring (Portuguese: Praça de Touros) in Albufeira, Portugal. Bullfighting, horse shows, and concerts were held in the arena until 2019. In 2021 it was sold with plans to no longer hold bullfights but to renovate the structure. This was following a failed attempt by the PAN group in 2020 to purchase the arena.
