= Bullring =

Arena where bullfighting is performed

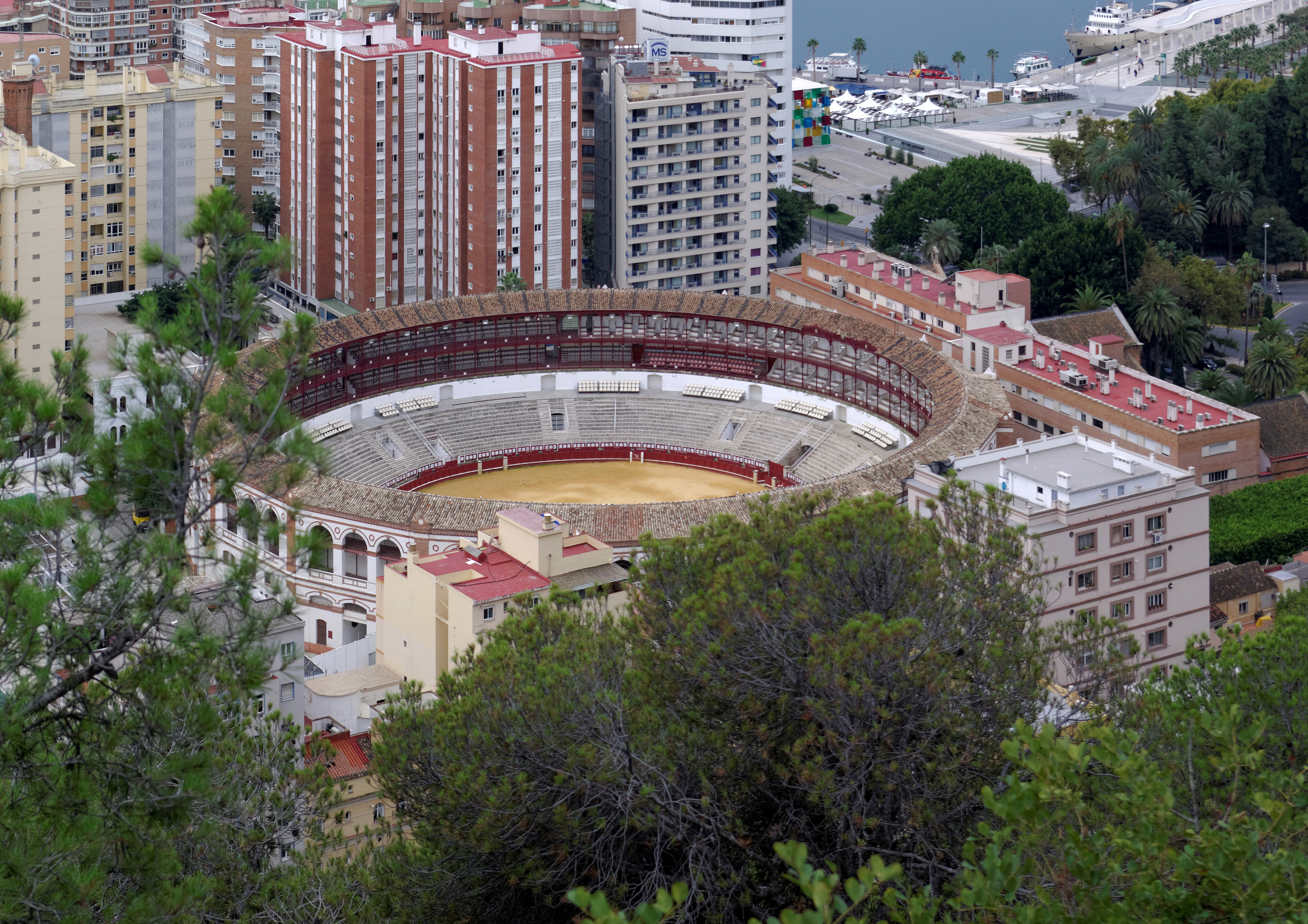
Málaga's bullring lies in the heart of the city.

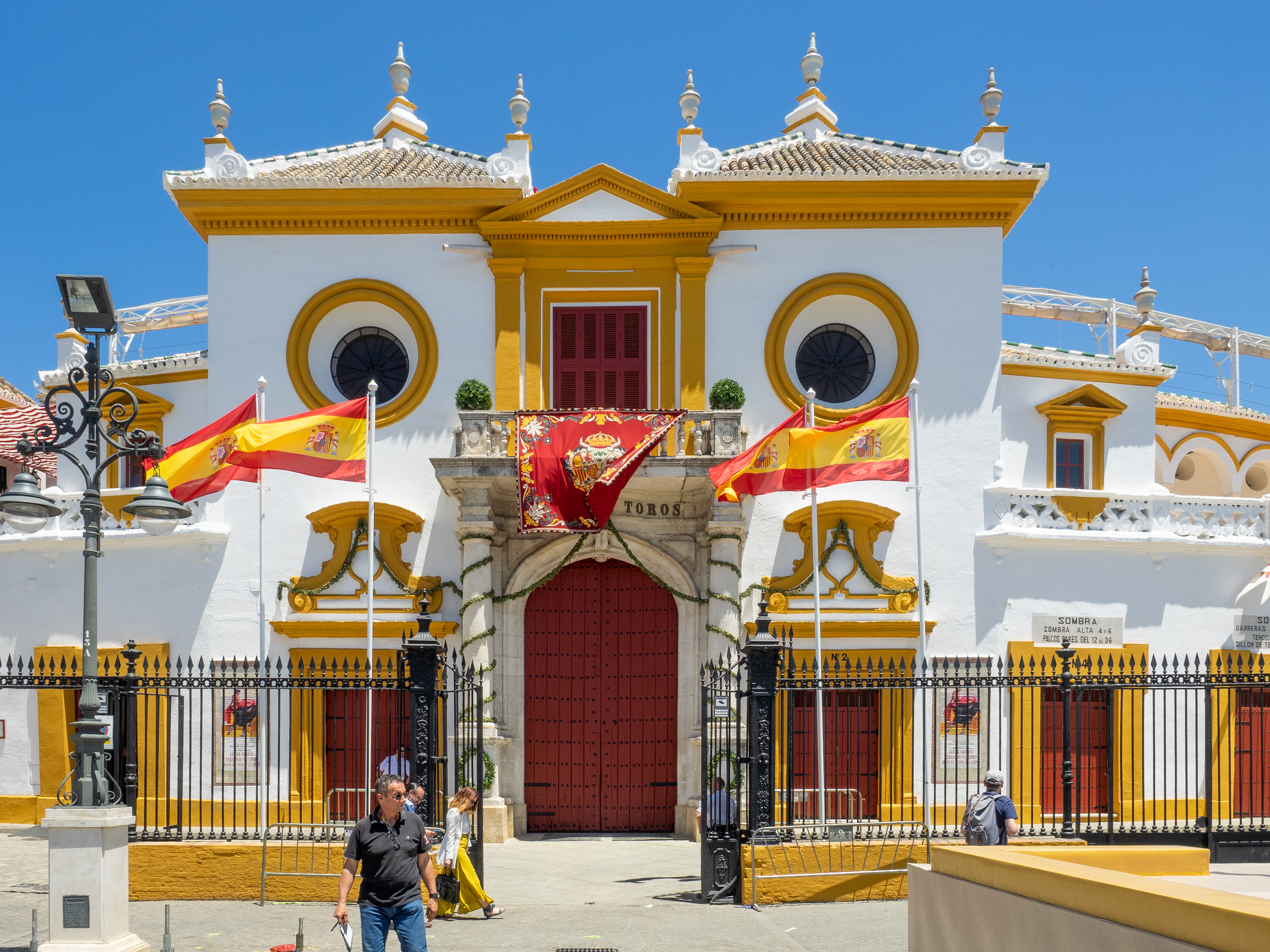
Façade of the oldest bullring in Spain, La Maestranza in Seville.

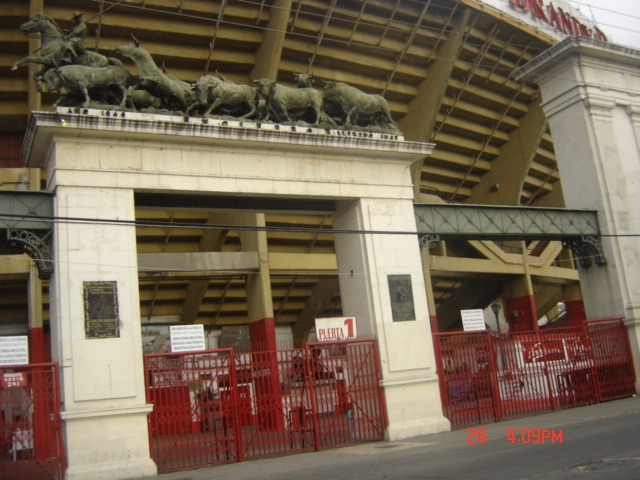
The Plaza México, which is situated in Mexico City, is the world's largest bullring.

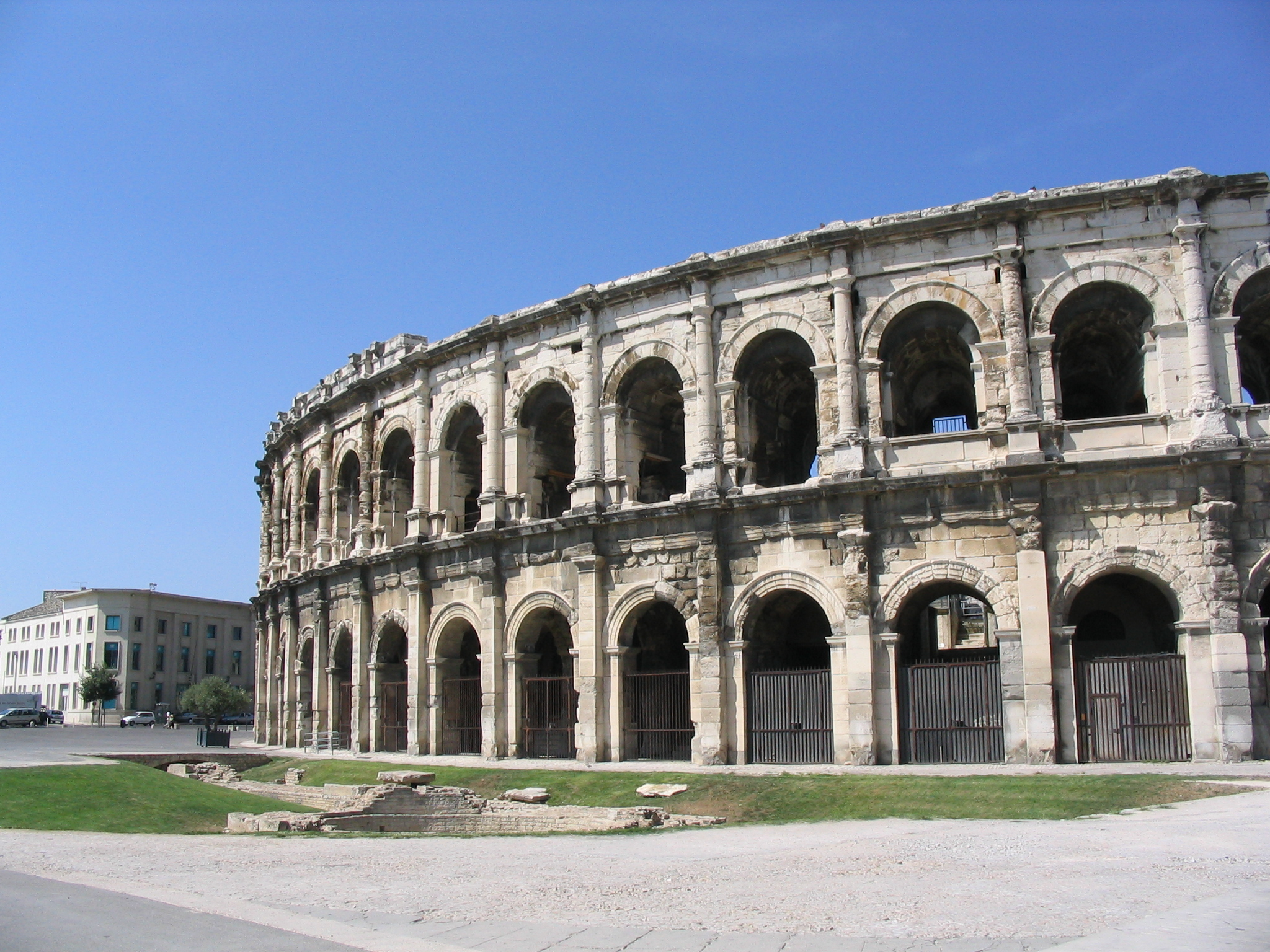
The facade of the Arena of Nîmes in Nîmes, a converted Roman amphitheatre

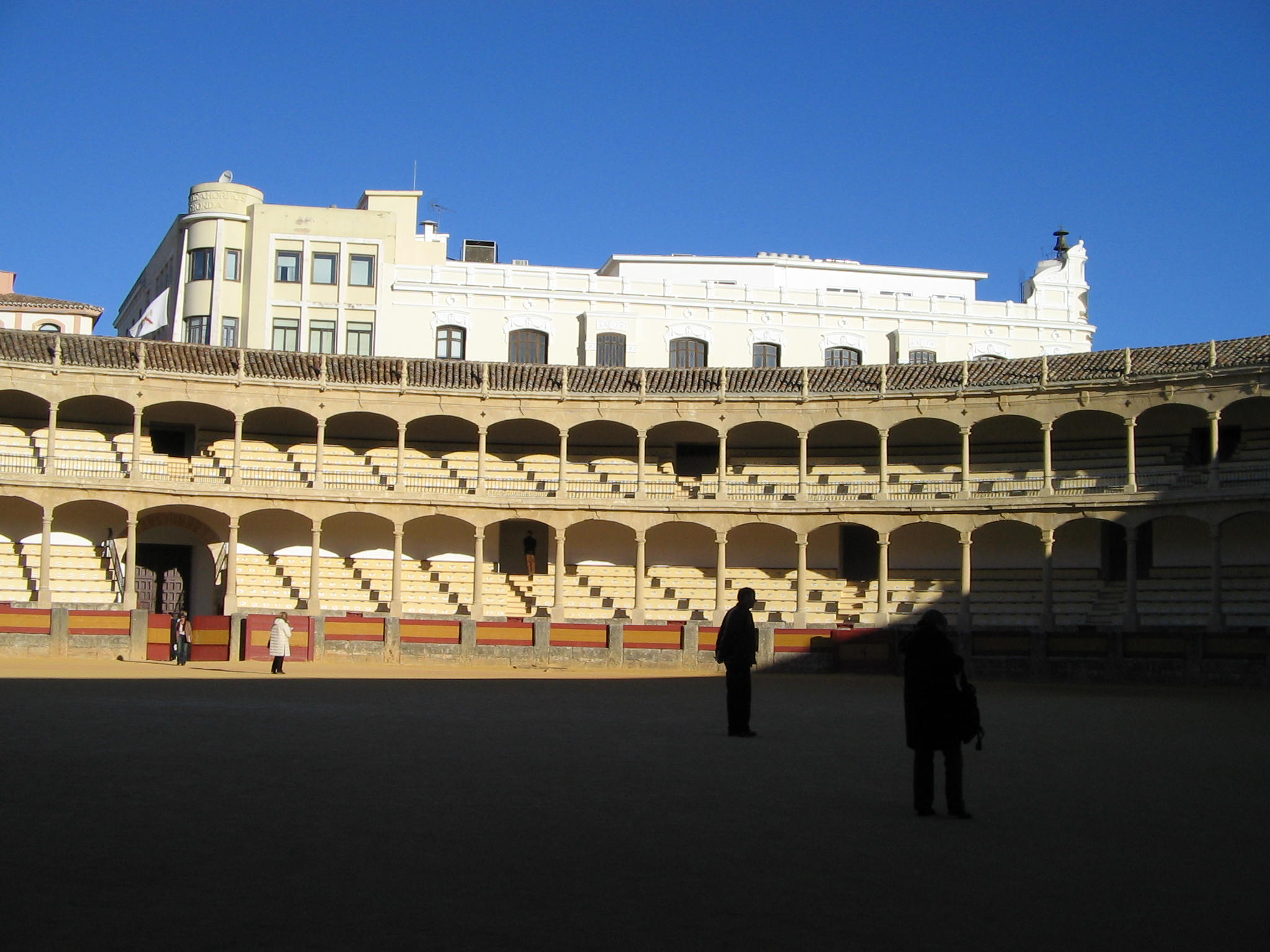
The Plaza de Toros de Ronda

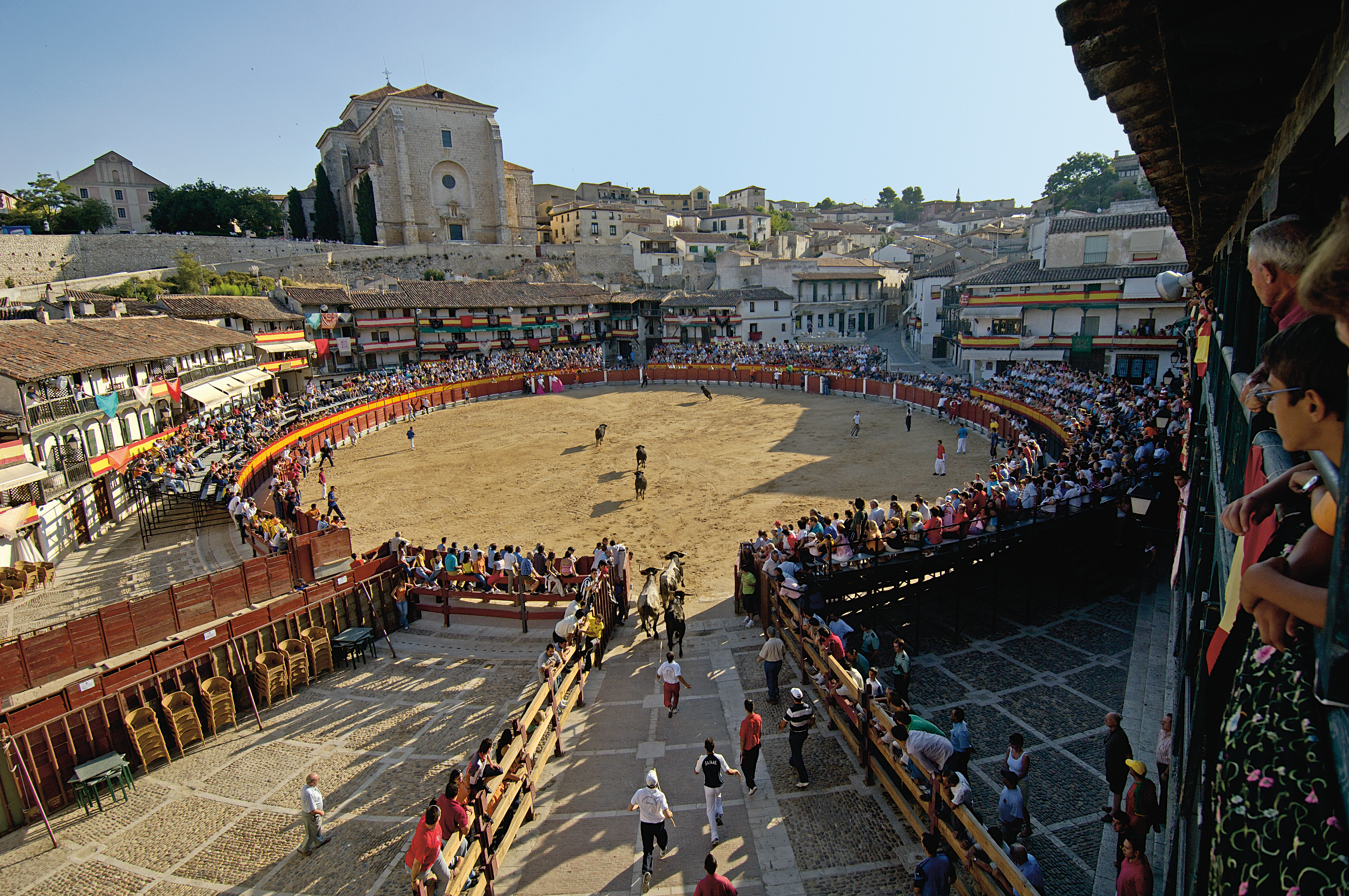
The Plaza de Toros de Chinchón.

A bullring is an arena where bullfighting is performed. Bullrings are often associated with the Iberian Peninsula, but they can also be found through Iberian America and in a few Spanish and Portuguese ex-colonies in Africa. Bullrings are often historic and culturally significant centres that bear many structural similarities to the Roman amphitheatre.

== Common structure ==
The classic bullring is an enclosed, roughly circular amphitheatre with tiered rows of stands that surround an open central space. The open space forms the arena or ruedo, a field of densely packed crushed rock (albero) that is the stage for the bullfight. Also on the ground level, the central arena is surrounded by a staging area where the bullfighters prepare and take refuge, called the callejón (alley). The callejón is separated from the arena by a wall or other structure, usually made of wood and roughly 140 cm high. The partition wall has doors for the entrance and exit of the bull (puerta de los toriles) and human participants (puerta de cuadrilla), although the form, number, and placement of these doors will vary from one bullring to another. In regular places, the wall is pushed outwards leaving splits (burladero, from burlar: to evade, to dodge) that allow the bullfighters to go in the arena and to take refuge but are too narrow for the bull. Nevertheless, on rare occasions the bull jumps the wall causing havoc in the corridor. The walls also have a type of stirrup or foothold that aids in crossing over to the central arena, and sometimes stirrups on the arena side as well; these are used mostly by event staff if they need to intervene quickly in the case of an emergency. The arena is surrounded by climbing rows of seats. The seats are priced differently according to the position of the sun during the show, normally in the afternoon. The hot sol, "sun", is cheaper than the fresher sombra, "shade".

== Architectural origins ==
Bullrings evolved as specialized sporting arenas hand-in-hand with the sport that demanded them. Many of the ancient Roman amphitheatres had characteristics that can be seen in the bullrings of today (in fact the ring in Nîmes, France, is a Roman artifact, though it is more elliptical than the usual plaza), and the origin of bullfighting is very closely related to certain Roman traditions; in the formative years of the sport on the Iberian Peninsula, those Roman enclosures were not commonly utilised for bullfighting events. Back when bullfighting festivals were conducted principally on horseback, the spectacle was a more public affair that took place in the city's open plaza areaIt was only later, when bullfights were conducted principally by men on foot, that the public needed a structure to house them appropriately. Initially, temporary wooden fences were erected to prevent the bulls from escaping. When bullfights became much more popular in 18th century, not only did the crowd need special seating to view the spectacle, they also needed a structure to contain the general disorder that reigned at festivals during the heyday of such legendary figures as Costillares, Pedro Romero, and Pepe-Hillo.

For centuries, early cosos (from Latin cursum, meaning course, track) were rectangular. The earliest examples are found in the Sierra de Huelva, which was the destination of transhumance routes from León, who brought some of their culture with them, including the feast of San Mamés, mostly associated with northern Spain. It was precisely in the hamlet of San Mamés, between Aroche and Rosal de la Frontera, where the oldest documented coso was built in 1599. Very little of the structure of this rectangular arena remains, which has been extensively documented by local historian Antonio Rodríguez Guillén "Chamizo". Another old coso was built in Almonaster la Real in 1608, and the nearby plaza from Campofrío, completed in 1718, is among the oldest with a circular shape. The oldest plaza still in use, Las Virtudes in Santa Cruz de Mudela, Ciudad Real, dates from 1641 and has a square shape. The plaza from Béjar (1711) was originally rectangular and later made circular. Likewise, when the La Maestranza bullring in Seville was authorized for construction in 1730 specifically to house bullfights, the original plans called for a rectangular arena for the first three years, only later to be changed to a circular form that avoided the cornering of the action and put all viewers at the same approximate distance, the same reason for the elliptical form of amphitheatres. Another circular plaza was begun in Ronda in 1754, and it featured its first bullfights in 1782.

In the late 19th century, the Neo-Mudéjar style became in vogue for plazas, involving decoration in visible brickwork. Since the 1990s, new construction technology allows some rings to be covered permanently or temporarily.

== Alternative uses ==
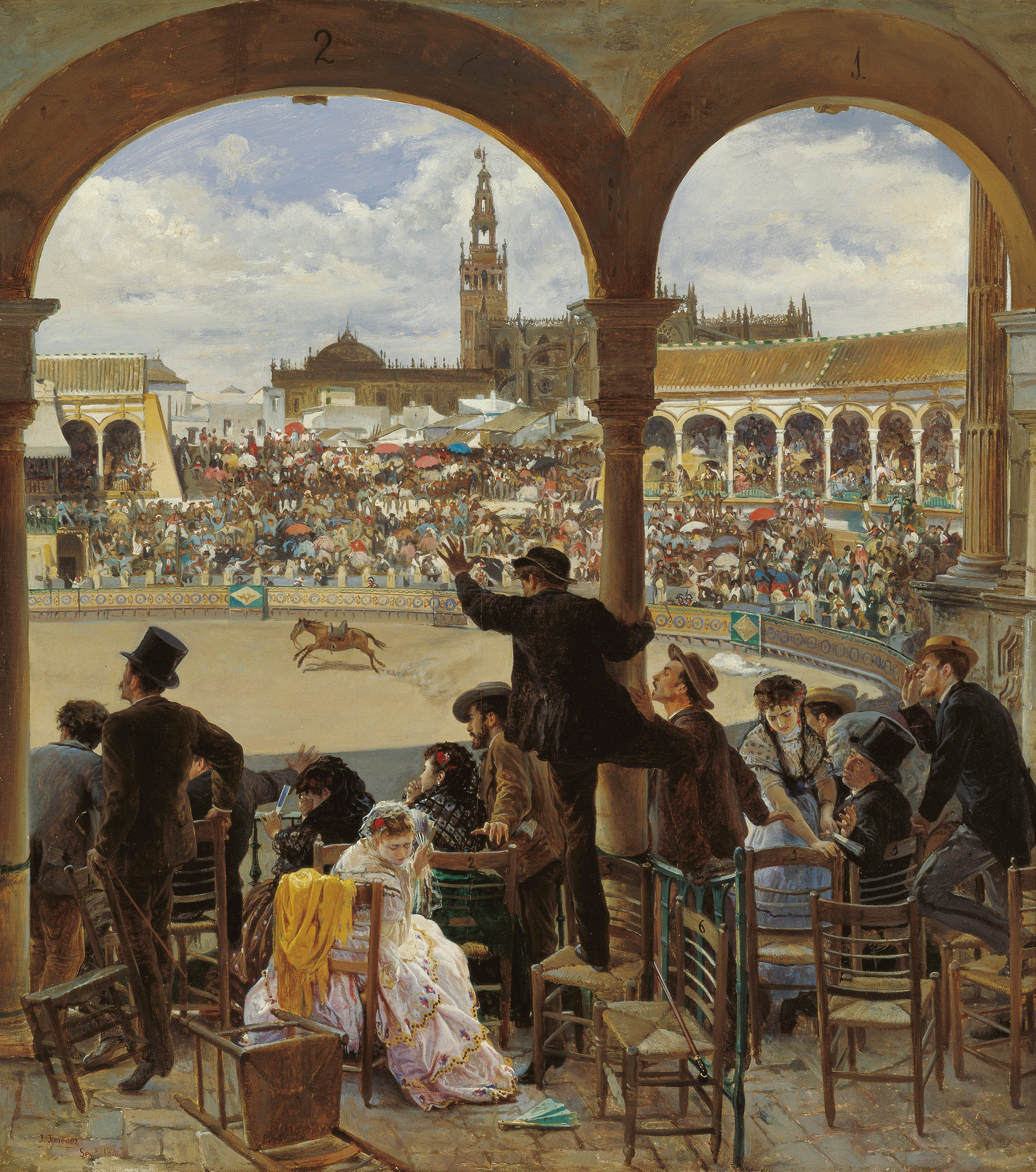
A Pass in the Bullring, in 1870, Seville, by painter José Jiménez Aranda.

The primary purpose of the ring is bullfighting, but it is usually limited to some festival weeks in the year. In other times, it may be used as a concert venue as in the Rock en el ruedo tour of Miguel Ríos or the live record Diamonds & Rust in the Bullring, featuring a Joan Baez concert in the Bilbao plaza.

Before the diffusion of modern sports premises, bullrings were used in the Basque Country for traditional sports similar to challenges of resistance running. The public made bets on the number of laps the runner could make. No bulls were involved.

After the battle of Badajoz (1936) of the Spanish Civil War, the Badajoz ring was used as a confinement camp for supporters of the republic and many thousands were executed there by the Nationalist forces who had just occupied the town.

Most indoor bullrings, especially in Mexico and elsewhere in Latin America, in addition to being used for concerts, have also been used for indoor sports such as basketball, ice hockey, boxing and lucha libre.

== Bullrings of the world ==
The most famous bullrings in the world are Plaza de Toros de Las Ventas in Madrid (Spain), widely regarded as the most prestigious one, La Maestranza in Seville (Spain), Campo Pequeno in Lisbon (Portugal) and Plaza de Toros México in Mexico City.

=== Europe ===
==== Spain ====
===== Major venues in Spain =====
- Plaza de Toros de Las Ventas, Madrid (1931)
- Plaza de Toros de Valencia (1851)
- La Maestranza, Seville (1761)
- Plaza de Toros de Vista Alegre, Bilbao
- Plaza de Toros de Pamplona, Pamplona
- Plaza de toros de La Malagueta, Málaga
- Plaza de Toros de los Califas, Córdoba
- Donostia Arena, San Sebastián
- Plaza de Toros de Zaragoza (1990)

===== Local venues in Spain =====
- Plaza de Toros, Aranjuez (1760)
- Plaza de Toros de Albacete, Albacete (1917)
- Plaza de Toros de Alicante, Alicante (1847)
- Plaza de Toros de El Puerto de Santa María, Cádiz (1880)
- Plaza de Toros de Fuengirola, Fuengirola (1962)
- Plaza de Toros de Granada (1928)
- Plaza de Toros de Jaén (1960)
- Plaza de Toros de La Coruña, A Coruña (1991)
- Plaza de Toros de La Ribera, Logroño (2001)
- Plaza de Toros de Marbella, Marbella (1964)
- Plaza de Toros de La Merced, Huelva (1968)
- Plaza de Toros de Murcia (1885)
- Plaza de Toros de Vitoria-Gasteiz (1941)
- Plaza de Toros de Ronda, Ronda (1785)
- Plaza de Toros La Glorieta, Salamanca (1893)
- Plaza de Toros de El Bibio, Gijón (1888)
- Plaza de Toros de Toledo (1865)
- Plaza de Toros de Segovia, (1805)

==== Portugal ====
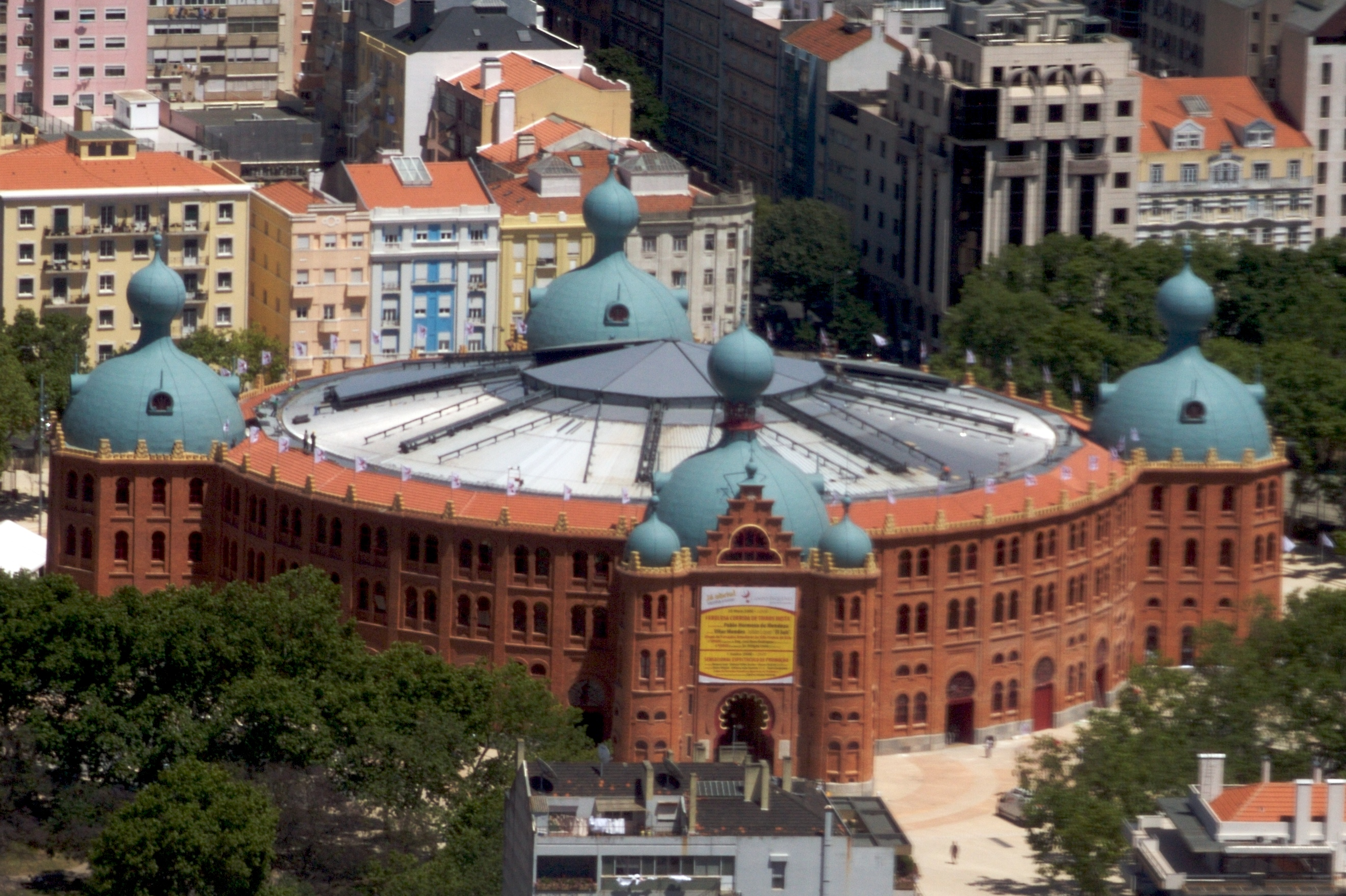
Campo Pequeno Bullring

- Campo Pequeno bullring, Lisbon
- Praça Toiros Palha Blanco, Vila Franca de Xira
- Coliseu Figueirense, Figueira da Foz
- Coliseu de Redondo, Redondo
- Póvoa de Varzim Bullfighting Arena, Póvoa de Varzim (near Porto)
- Praça de Toiros de Albufeira, Albufeira
- Praça de Touros Amadeu Augusto dos Santos, Montijo
- Praça de Touros Celestino Graça, Santarém
- Praça de Touros da Luz, Mourão (in contemporary architectural style)
- Praça de Touros Daniel de Nascimento, Moita
- Praça de Touros de Abiúl, Pombal (one of the oldest)
- Praça de Touros de Estremoz, Estremoz
- Praça de Touros de Monsaraz, Reguengos de Monsaraz (very ancient)
- Praça de Touros de Montemor-o-Novo, Montemor-o-Novo
- Praça de Touros da Nazaré, Nazaré
- Praça de Touros de Salvaterra, Salvaterra de Magos
- Praça de Touros de Santa Eulália, Elvas
- Praça de Touros de Santo António das Areias, Marvão
- Praça de Touros de Sobral de Monte Agraço, Sobral de Monte Agraço
- Praça de Touros de Urrós, Mogadouro
- Praça de Touros do Cartaxo, Cartaxo
- Praça de Touros João Branco Núncio, Alcácer do Sal
- Praça de Touros Carlos Relvas, Setúbal

==== France ====
- The Arena of Nîmes, Nîmes
- The arena in Arles
- The arena in Alès
- The arena in Mont de Marsan
- The arena in Bouillargues
- The arena in Trèbes
- The arena in Vauvert
- There are also arenas in an important part of small villages of Camargue

Villages round the Camargue, such as Rodilhan in the Gard, who also practise 'mise à mort' - killing the bull.

=== Africa ===
- Plaza de toros de Melilla, Melilla

==== Algeria ====
- Arènes d'Oran, Oran

==== Angola ====
- Luanda Bullring, Luanda

==== Morocco ====
- Plaza de Toros Tangier, Tangier
- Laayoune bullring, Laayoune

==== Mozambique ====
- Praça de Touros Monumental de Lourenço Marques, Maputo

=== Americas ===
==== Mexico ====
- Coliseo Centenario, Torreón
- Plaza de Toros México, Mexico City (Currently the biggest bullring worldwide)
- Plaza de Toros Monumental de Aguascalientes, Aguascalientes
- Plaza de Toros Monumental de Tijuana, Tijuana
- Plaza de Toros Santa María, Santiago de Querétaro
- Plaza Monumental de Morelia, Morelia
- Plaza Nuevo Progreso, Guadalajara
- Plaza El Paseo, San Luis Potosí
- Plaza de Toros El Relicario, Puebla
- Plaza Santiago J. Vivanco, Matehuala
- Plaza de Toros Jorge "El Ranchero" Aguilar, Tlaxcala
- Plaza Monumental Zacatecas, Zacatecas
- Plaza Monumental Monterrey Lorenzo Garza, Monterrey
- Plaza de Toros Cadereyta, Cadereyta Jiménez
- Plaza de Toros Alejandra, Durango
- Plaza de Toros Provincia Juriquilla, Santiago de Querétaro
- Plaza La Luz, León
- Plaza San Marcos, Aguascalientes
- Plaza Silverio Pérez, Texcoco
- Plaza Quintana Roo, Cancún
- Plaza El Centenario (The Centennial), Tlaquepaque
- Plaza de Toros Alberto Balderas, Ciudad Juárez
- Plaza Revolución, Irapuato
- Plaza de Mérida Mérida
- Plaza Calafia, Mexicali
- Palacio del Arte, Morelia
- Plaza de la Concordia, Orizaba
- Plaza de Toros La Esperanza, Chihuahua
- Plaza de Toros Vicente Segura, Pachuca
- Plaza de Toros Rodolfo Gaona, Cañadas de Obregón, Jalisco
- Monumental Plaza de Toros El Pinal, Teziutlán
- Monumental Plaza de Toros de Don Antonio, Tepic
- Plaza de Toros La Sinaloense, Culiacán
- Plaza de Toros Alberto Balderas de Moroleón, Moroleón
- Plaza de Toros Monumental de Villahermosa, Villahermosa
- Plaza de Toros La Taurina, Huamantla
- Plaza de Toros Jose Julian Llaguno, Tlatenango

==== Argentina ====
- Plaza de Toros de Montserrat (1791–1799)
- Plaza de Toros del Retiro (1801–1818)

==== Colombia ====
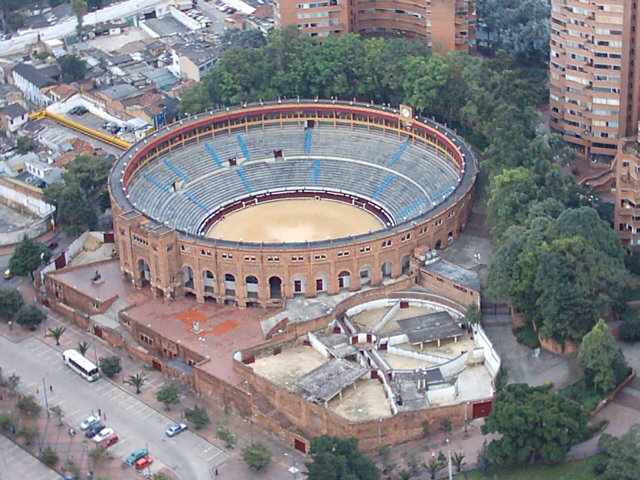
Santamaría Bullring

- Santamaría Bullring, Bogotá
- Plaza de Toros La Macarena, Medellín
- Plaza de Toros de Manizales, Manizales
- Plaza de Toros Cañaveralejo, Cali
- Plaza de toros El Bosque, Armenia.
- Plaza de toros La Pradera, Sogamoso.
- Plaza de toros de Vistahermosa, Floridablanca (Santander).
- Plaza de toros Monumental Señor de los Milagros, Girón (Santander).
- Plaza de toros de Cartagena, Cartagena de Indias.
- Plaza de toros César Rincón, Duitama.
- Plaza de toros Pepe Cáceres, Ibagué.
- Plaza de toros de San Fermín, Pamplona.
- Plaza de toros de Cúcuta, Cúcuta.
- Plaza de toros Agustín Barona, Palmira.
- Plaza de toros La Real Maestranza, Guatavita.

==== Ecuador ====
- Plaza de toros de Quito, Quito.

==== Peru ====
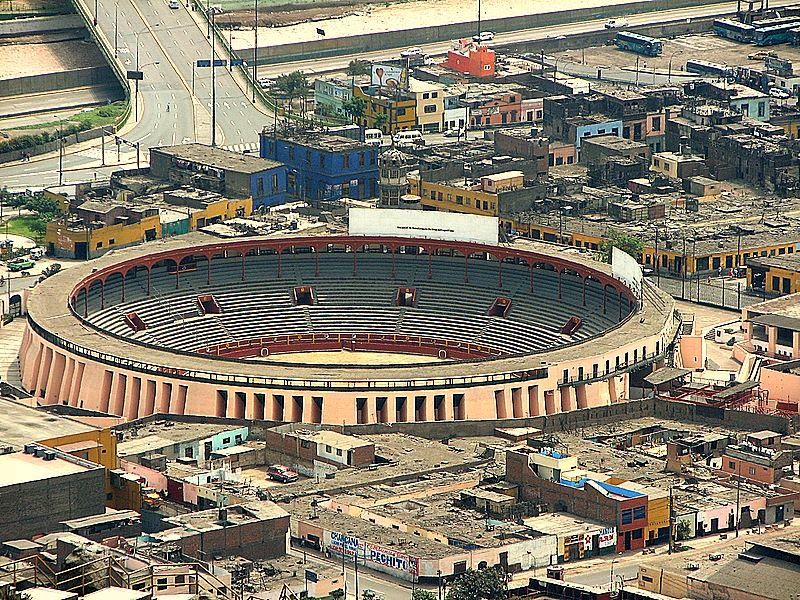
The colonial Plaza de toros de Acho in Lima, Peru, opened on 30 January 1766.

- Plaza de toros de Acho, Lima. 2nd oldest. 30 January 1766.
- Plaza de Toros Sol y Sombra, Lima
- Plaza de Toros de la Provincia de Cutervo, Cajamarca
- Plaza de Toros "El Vizcaíno", Cajamarca
- Plaza de Toros de Trujillo "El Coliseo", Trujillo
- Plaza de Toros de El Coliseo, Huancayo
- Plaza de Toros de Sicaya, Huancayo
- Plaza de Toros de la Unión, Huánuco
- Plaza de Toros de Guadalupe, Ica
- Plaza de Toros de Puquío, Ayacucho.

==== Uruguay ====
- Plaza de toros Real de San Carlos, Colonia del Sacramento (closed after prohibition of bull fighting in 1912)

==== Venezuela ====
- Plaza Monumental de Valencia, Valencia, Carabobo. (The 2nd largest bullring in the world)
- Maestranza César Girón, Maracay
- Plaza de toros Monumental de Maracaibo, Maracaibo
- Plaza Monumental de Toros de Pueblo Nuevo, San Cristóbal, Táchira
- Plaza Monumental Román Eduardo Sandia, Mérida, Mérida

==== United States ====
- Santa Maria Bullring, San Isidro, Texas

== Bullrings by capacity ==
| # | Bullring | Location | Capacity | Image |
|---|---|---|---|---|
| 1 | Plaza de Toros México | Mexico City, Mexico | 41,262 | |
| 2 | Plaza de Toros Monumental de Valencia | Valencia, Venezuela | 24,708 | |
| 3 | Plaza de Toros de Las Ventas | Madrid, Spain | 23,798 | |
| 4 | Plaza Monumental de Tijuana | Tijuana, Mexico | 21,621 | |
| 5 | Plaza de Toros de Pamplona | Pamplona, Spain | 19,720 | |
| 6 | Plaza Nuevo Progreso | Guadalajara, Mexico | 16,561 | |
| 7 | Plaza de Toros Monumental de Aguascalientes | Aguascalientes, Mexico | 16,000 | |
| 8 | Plaza Monumental Román Eduardo Sandia | Mérida, Venezuela | 16,000 | |
| 9 | Plaza de Toros Monumental de Maracaibo | Maracaibo, Venezuela | 15,000 | |
| 10 | Plaza de Toros de La Merced | Huelva, Spain | 15,000 | |
| 11 | Plaza de Toros de Murcia | Murcia, Spain | 15,000 | |
| 12 | Plaza Monumental de Toros de Pueblo Nuevo | San Cristóbal, Venezuela | 15,000 | |
| 13 | Plaza de Toros de Vista Alegre | Bilbao, Spain | 14,781 | |
| 14 | Plaza de Toros Cañaveralejo | Cali, Colombia | 14,368 | |
| 15 | Plaza de Toros de Granada | Granada, Spain | 14,000 | |
| 16 | Plaza de Toros de los Califas | Córdoba, Spain | 14,000 | |
| 17 | Plaza de Toros de Acho | Lima, Peru | 13,700 | |
| 18 | Praça de Touros Celestino Graça | Santarém, Portugal | 13,179 | |
| 19 | Plaza de Toros de Valencia | Valencia, Spain | 12,000 | |
| 20 | Plaza de Toros de Albacete | Albacete, Spain | 12,000 | |
| 21 | Plaza de Toros de la Real Maestranza de Caballería de Sevilla | Seville, Spain | 12,000 | |
| 22 | Plaza de Toros de La Ribera | Logroño, Spain | 11,046 | |
| 23 | Plaza de Toros Calafia | Mexicali, Mexico | 11,000 | |
| 24 | Plaza de Toros de Valladolid | Valladolid, Spain | 11,000 | |
| 25 | Monumental Las Palomas | Algeciras, Spain | 11,000 | |
| 26 | Plaza de Toros La Glorieta | Salamanca, Spain | 10,858 | |
| 27 | Plaza de Toros de Jaén | Jaén, Spain | 10,500 | |
| 28 | Plaza de Toros de Zaragoza | Zaragoza, Spain | 10,072 | |
| 29 | Plaza de Toros de Santander | Santander, Spain | 10,000 | |
| 30 | Plaza de Toros de Palencia | Palencia, Spain | 10,000 | |
| 31 | Plaza de toros Maestranza César Girón | Maracay, Venezuela | 7,000 | |
| 32 | Plaza de Toros de Muro | Muro, Spain | 4,800 | |

== See also ==
- Lists of stadiums
