= Plaza de Toros de Manizales =

Coordinates: 5.0639°N 75.5250°W

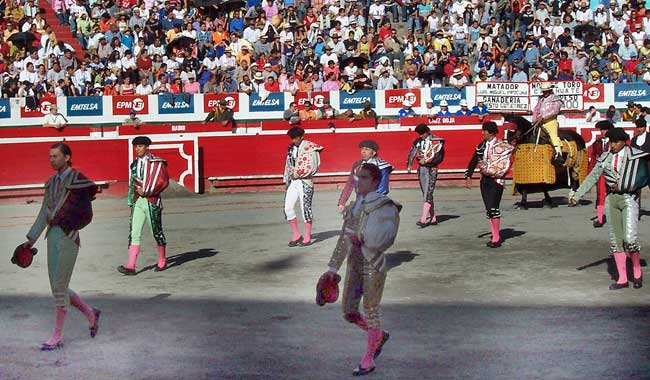
Bullfighters performing the parade before the bullfight in a bullring in Colombia.

Plaza de Toros de Manizales is a bullring located on its homonym city, in the center of Colombia. It's currently used for bullfighting during the Annual Fair of Manizales in January (Feria de Manizales), musical events and sport events to a lesser extent.

== History ==
Around 1897, a small circus was inaugurated for the first taurine festivity made in the city. Afterward, a number of circuses would be built, leading to the construction of Plaza de toros El Soldado located in what currently is Batallón de Ayacucho, it was built in 15 days and inaugurated on May 14, 1944.

On September 27, 1945, the Plaza de Toros de Manizales society was assembled by José Restrepo Restrepo, Pedro Jaramillo, Vicente Gutiérrez, Jesús María Bermúdez, Antonio Pinzón, Benjamín Patiño Callejas, Laserna Hoyos Ltda., Alberto Gómez U., Rafael Villegas, Luis Carlos Valencia, Oscar Hoyos Botero, Ignacio González, Gustavo Vélez Arango, Pantaleón González, Roberto Cardona Arias and don Antonio Cuartas. Over the years, they transferred the ownership to Cruz Roja Seccional Caldas, its actual owner.

Construction company "Robledo y Borrero" delivered the building on December 23, 1951, when the first bullfight was performed under the advice of Octavio Gutiérrez A. The building was made for twelve thousand seats but was first enabled for seven thousand. Between 1951 and 1955 some bullfighting events and festivities were made, including the presentation of Mexican comedian Mario Moreno -Cantinflas-, Rubén Escobar – Escobarito-, Félix Rodríguez Antón, José Eslava, Julián e Isidro Marín, José María Martorel, Antonio Ordóñez, Pedro Martínez -Pedrés- and Joselillo de Colombia.
