= Plaza de Toros La Glorieta =

Bullring in Salamanca, Spain

Coordinates: 40.977327°N 5.66113°W

Plaza de Toros de Salamanca – La Glorieta, nicknamed La Glorieta or Plaza de Toros de La Glorieta, is a bullring at Avenida San Agustín, 1, Salamanca, Castile and León, Spain. It is currently used for bullfighting. The stadium holds 10,858 people. It was built in 1892 and officially opened on September 11, 1893. It is classical in style and has three levels made of stone, wrought-iron and brick. The ring is 54 metres (177 ft) in diameter.
