= Plaza de Toros Monumental de Aguascalientes =

Coordinates: 21.874829°N 102.306836°W

Plaza de toros Monumental de Aguascalientes
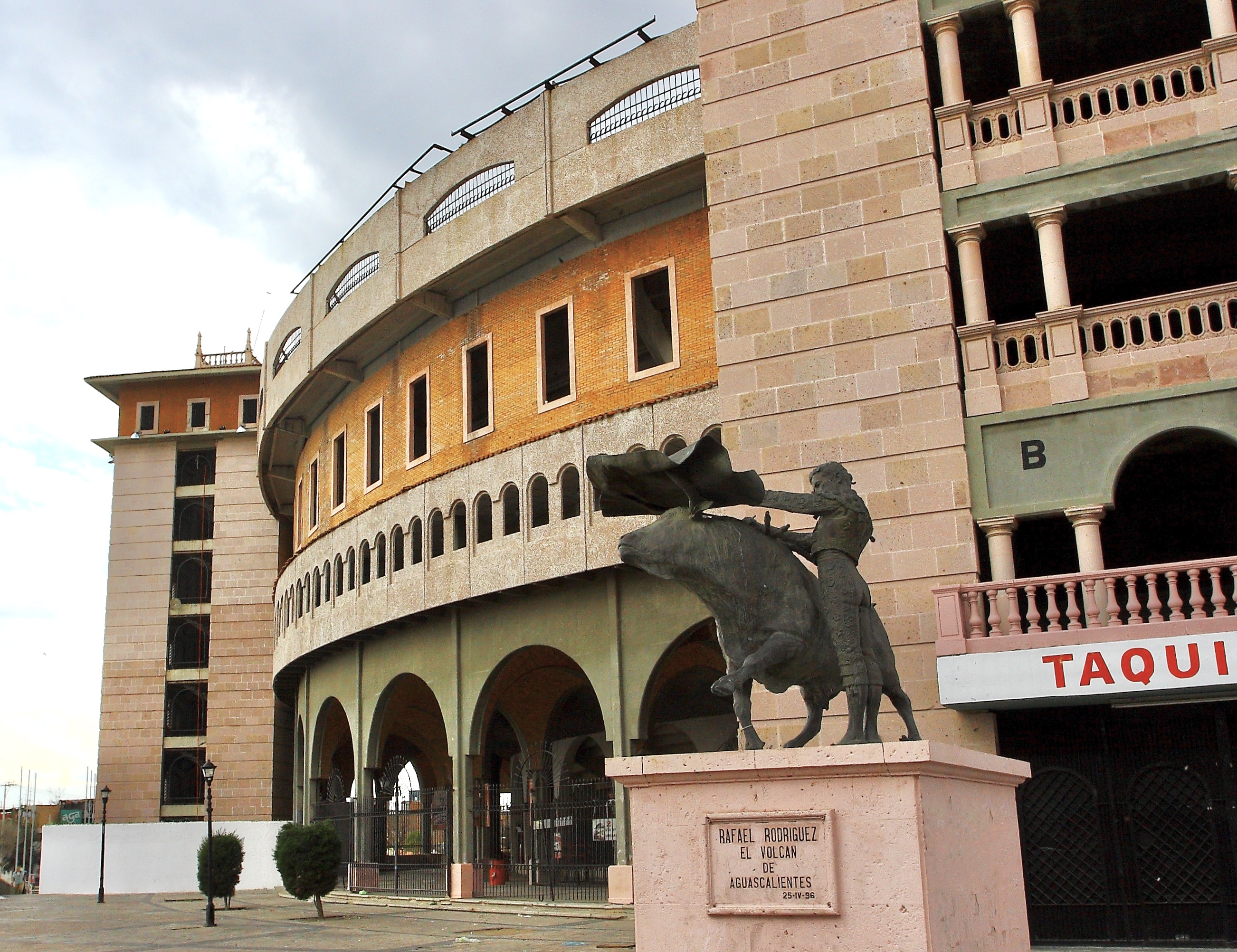
- Interactive map of the Plaza de toros Monumental de Aguascalientes area

General information
- Type: Bullring
- Location: Rafael Rodríguez Domínguez S/N, Barrio de San Marcos, 20070, Aguascalientes, Mexico
- Inaugurated: 23 November 1974; 51 years ago

Plaza de toros Monumental de Aguascalientes is a bullring in the city of Aguascalientes, Mexico. It is currently used for bullfighting and concerts. The stadium holds 16,000 people and it was inaugurated on November 23, 1974. Its currently the 4th largest bullring in Mexico.
