= Plaza de Toros de Pamplona =

Bullring in Pamplona, Spain

Coordinates: 42°48′57.12″N 1°38′22.37″W

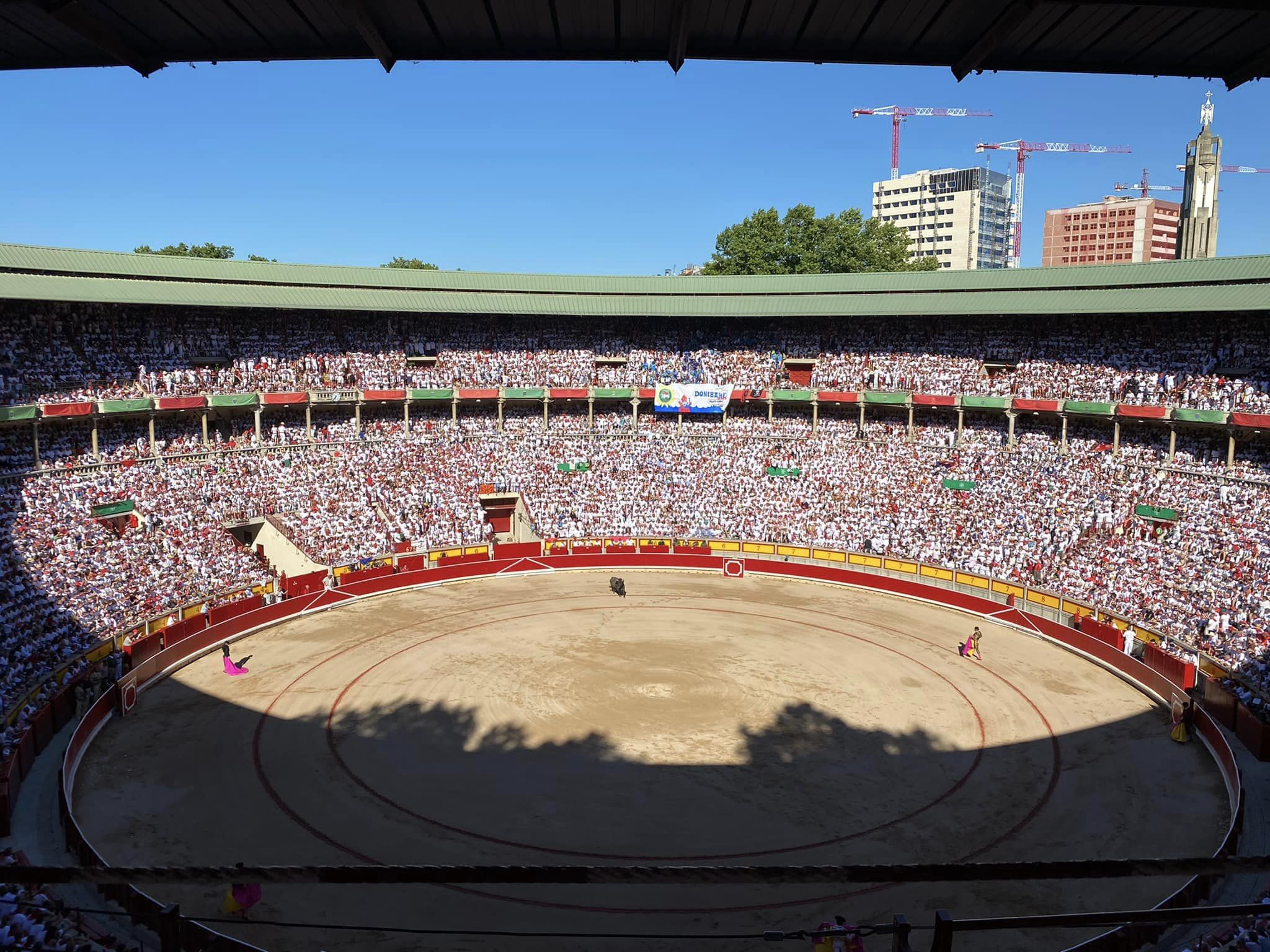
Plaza de Toros de Pamplona in Pamplona Spain during the 2022 San Fermin Festival.

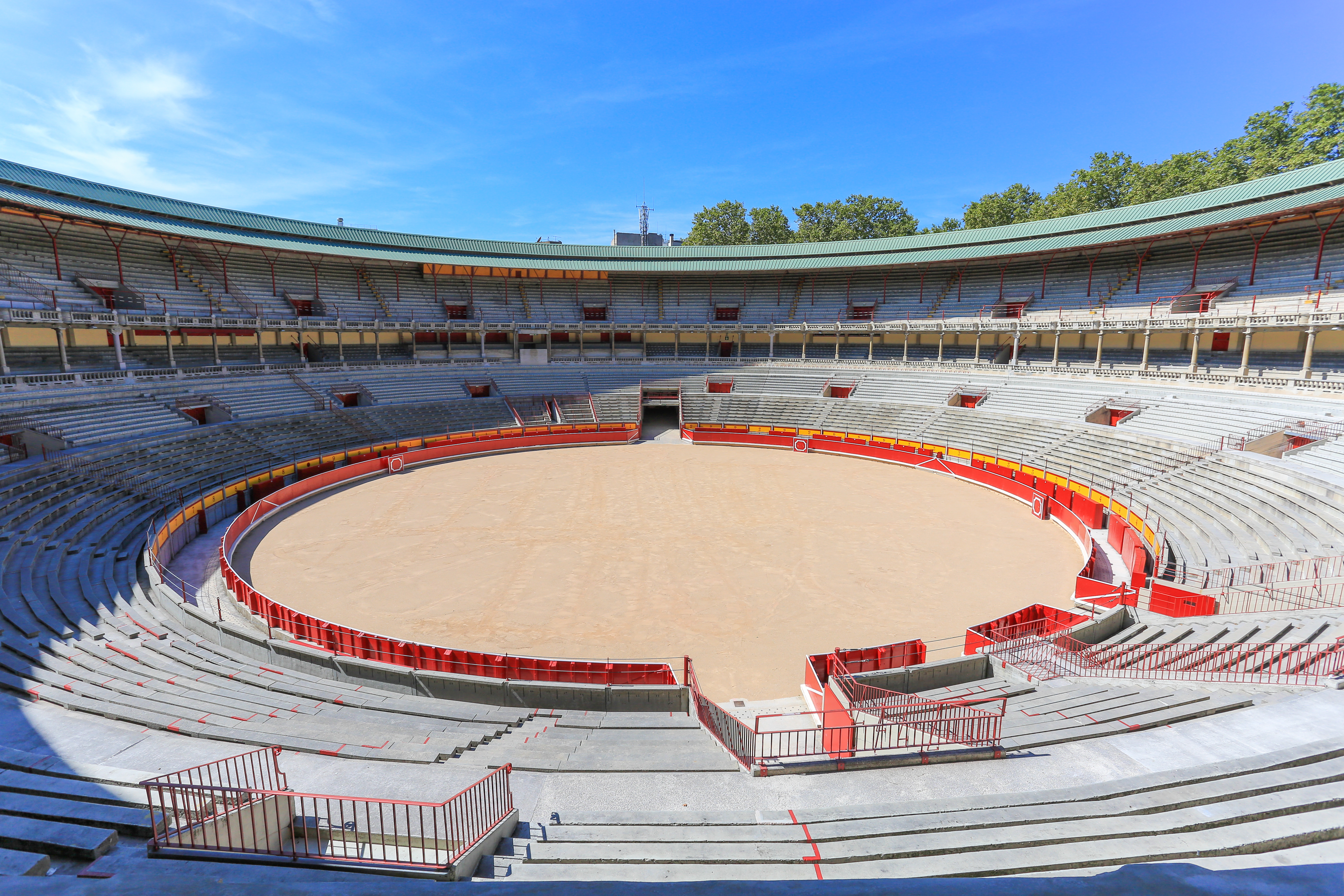
Interior of the ring

Plaza de Toros de Pamplona is a bullring in Pamplona, Spain. It is currently used for bullfighting, sporting or cultural events and music concerts.

Built in 1922 by Francisco Urcola, the stadium holds 19,720 people. It is the end point of the famous running of the bulls during the festival of San Fermín.

During the first months of 1939, towards the end of Spanish Civil War, it housed a Francoist concentration camp with a capacity of 3,000 Republican prisoners.
