= Plaza de Toros de Albacete =

Coordinates: 38°59′51″N 1°51′49″W

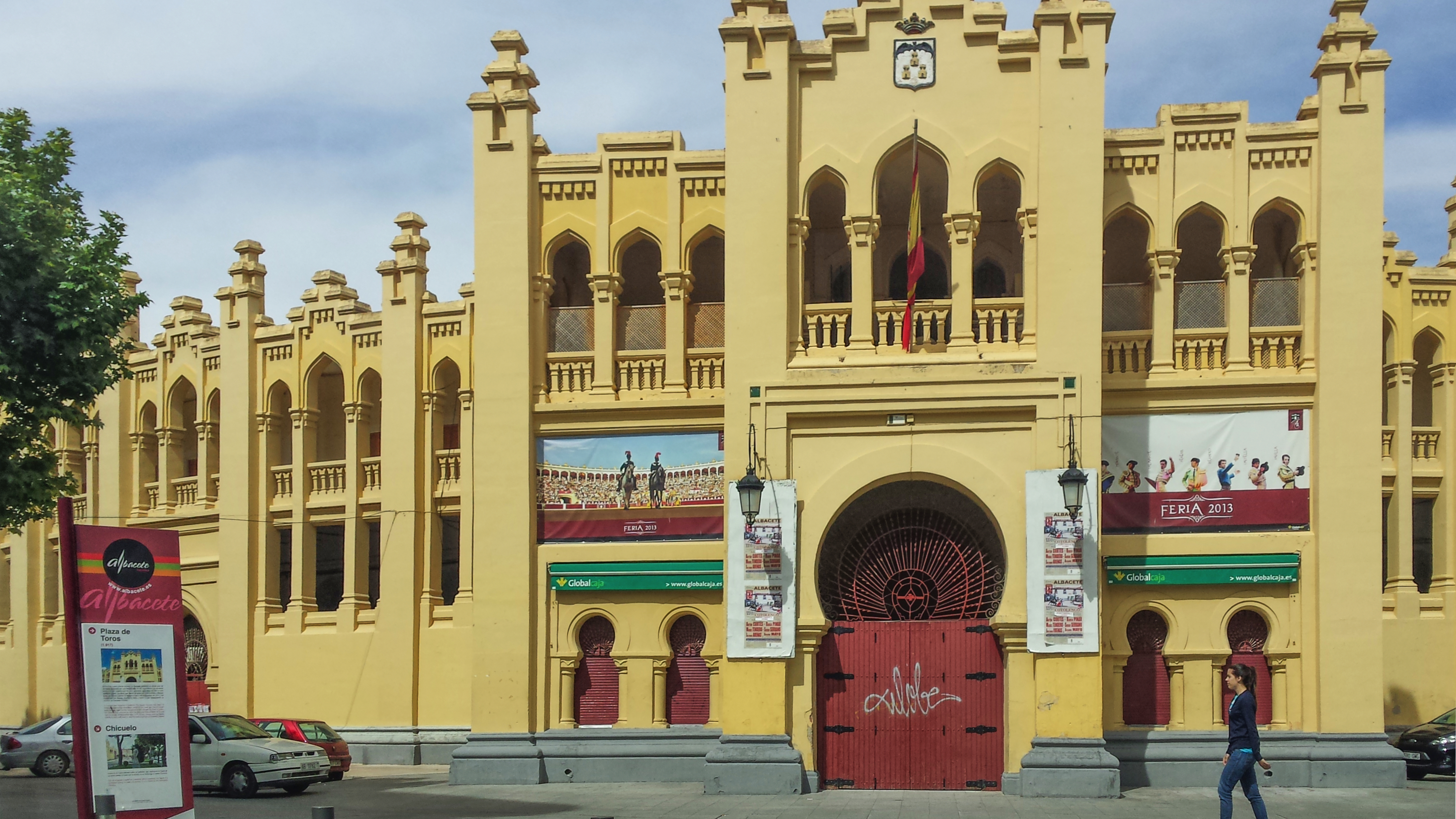
General view of "La Chata"

The Plaza de Toros de Albacete is a bullring in the town of the Albacete, in the region of Castilla-La Mancha (Spain).

Popularly known as "La Chata", a member of the Royal Academy, José Maria de Cossio, called it "one of the most excellent bullrings of Spain".

== History ==
=== The first bullfights: La plaza del Altozano (Hill-top) ===
The city of Albacete has a tradition of bullfighting that goes back centuries. According to the minutes of the city council of 29 May 1564 bullfights were to be held in the plaza del Altozan (downtown at the time) on 24 June in honour of John the Baptist, the patron saint of the town.

The first bullring built in Albacete, dating from the late eighteenth century, was located on the promenade of the Fairground paseo de la Feria) and was popularly known as the "Caulín" in memory of the main sponsor.

=== The second bullring (nineteenth century) ===
The second Albacete bullring was built to accommodate the growing interest and expanding population of the town. It was inaugurated on 9 September 1829 by Juan Jiménez “El Morenillo” y Manuel Lucas Blanco. The bulls were provided by Fernando Freire y Gil Flore. The leading torero of the time.

The building was circular, measuring 34 meters in diameter and comprising two floors. While the first was intended for standing spectators with a few rows of seats, the second was for reserved areas and boxes. The materials used in its construction were stone, earth and brick. In a time when Albacete had a population just over 17,000, the bullring was designed to accommodate 7400 people.

It had four doors for public use leading to 10 stairways to the stands. Beneath were three horse stables, two holding-pens with adjacent yards, an infirmary with three beds, three meeting-rooms and administration spaces, one of which was used as a chapel for the competitors. It also had units around the outside that were rented. In 1916, the then mayor, Francisco Fontecha, proposed building a new plaza because of the advanced state of deterioration. Despite repairs and minor modifications it was finally demolished in that year to build the current facility

=== The current bullring ===
On 20 September 1916 a meeting was held at City Hall to discuss the matter, and finally the construction of a new bullring was agreed, partly for security and partly to attract visitors to the town. The positive response of many attending the meeting the proposal was immediately accepted by general acclamation. The subscriptions subsequently raised 338,250 pesetas despite the difficult economic situation of the time.

For the building of the arena a corporation called Taurine Albacete was created, and architect Julio Carrilero appointed. Construction began on 17 February 1916 and concluded in record time, on 9 September 1917. For the opening spectacle, the bulls were furnished by Don Fernando Villalon

In 1918, the stands were refurbished with Novelda stone, which currently still exists. In 1921, they changed the roofing and in the late 1980s expanded the capacity, which the currently can accommodate 12,000 people.
