= Plaza de Toros Tangier =

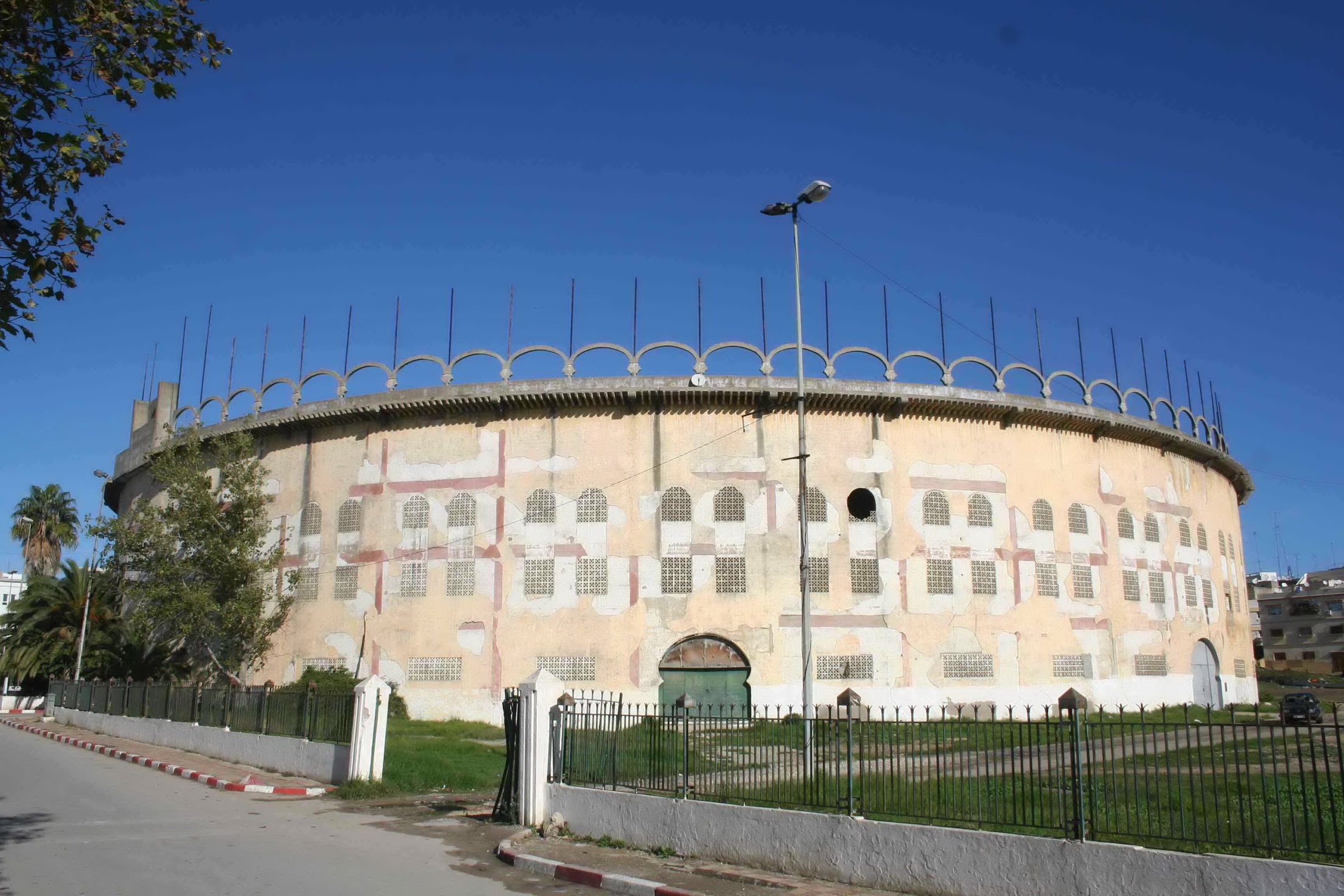

The bullring of Tangier also known as the Plaza de Toros or the place des arenes, is the only bullring in Tangier, Morocco. It was inaugurated in 1950 by the Spanish, and had a capacity to carry 13,013 seats. Abandoned for several years, this place remains an important piece of historical heritage Tangerois.

== History ==
In Tangier, between the road of Tetouan and the Avenue Yacoub El Mansour, lies the bullring. Built during the 1940s by the Spaniards, this arena was opened on August 27, 1950. Bullfights were held until the independence of Morocco, since which the plaza has been abandoned for many years.

== Bullfighters in Tangier ==
Manolo Bernal. He lived on the street Sevilla and his father had a bakery and family Bernal slope of the beach.

Jesús Cañizares. He lived by the American Legation. He works at the shoe store where the film was Mauritania. He goaded much as flagman and also collaborated with Luis Alvarez in public relations sales Square Madrid.

Primo Díaz y Campos. He was born in El Puerto de Santa María. He arrived in Tangier after the Spanish Civil War as many Spanish Tangier. He studied at the Marianists and lived down the street Fez street Isaac Peral.

Pepito Medina. He was born in Lucena and lived in the way of the mountain next to the stairs of Monte Cristo. It was the first Tangerino to bullfight with picadors in Tangier.

Luis Álvarez.Son of a practitioner who lived in the street Mexico. He studied at the Marianists. By leaving the bulls entered public relations in sales of Madrid. He was an entrepreneur of some places, one of San Martin de Valdeiglesias. It took a Morenito Maracai, Cruz Vélez, César Rincón, Enrique Ponce and many more.
