= Santamaría Bullring =

Bullring in Bogotá, Colombia

Coordinates: 4°36′47″N 74°04′05″W

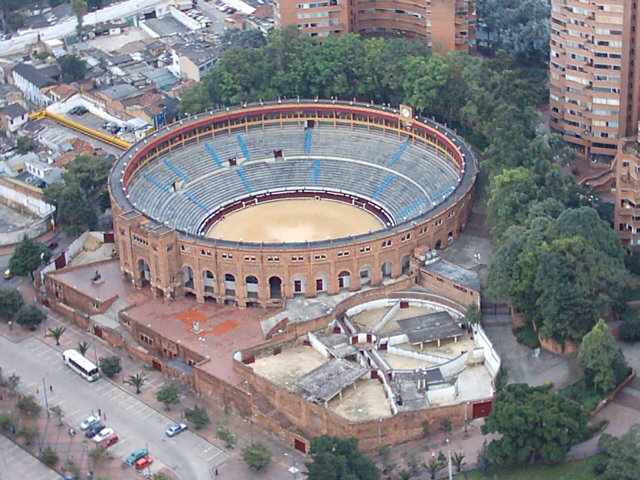
The Santamaría Bullring, 2005.

Santamaría Bullring (Spanish: Plaza de Toros de Santamaría) is a bullring in Bogotá, Colombia, and it is currently used for bullfighting, although it has also been used for concerts and other cultural activities. The stadium holds 14,500 people and was built in 1931. This bullring is more commonly known as the Plaza de Toros Santamaría. Outside this bullring there is a statue honoring Pepe Cáceres, the famous Colombian torero. In 2012 the then mayor of Bogotá, Gustavo Petro, announced entering into dialogue with the capital's community to ban bullfighting in the city and give the Santamaría Bullring another use, in addition to denying resources of public enterprises for such parties. In 2017, after 4 years of suspension, bullfighting returned to Santamaría Bullring because of Enrique Peñalosa's decision, the city's former mayor.
