= Plaza Monumental de Morelia =

Sports complex in Morelia, Mexico

Coordinates: 19°42′1″N 101°12′40″W

- Interactive map of Plaza Monumental de Morelia
- Location: Calle Jesus Solorzano No. 164 Col. Nueva Valladolid Morelia, Mexico 58190
- Owner: Privately owned
- Capacity: 15,000

Construction
- Opened: March 2, 1952

Plaza Monumental de Morelia (Monumental Plaza of Morelia in English) is a multi-purpose complex in Morelia, Michoacán, Mexico. The complex can seat up to 15,000 people. It accommodates bullfights, jaripeos, and concerts.

Construction for the complex began on 11 July 1951 under the administration of Michoacán governor Dámaso Cárdenas. It was opened to the public March 2, 1952.
