= Plaza de Toros de Montserrat =

- Location: Monserrat, Buenos Aires
- Owner: Viceroyalty of the Río de la Plata
- Capacity: 2,000

Construction
- Opened: 1791
- Closed: 1799

Plaza de Toros de Montserrat was a Spanish colonial auditorium of bullfighting shows. It was located in the suburbs of the neighborhood of Montserrat (Buenos Aires).

== History ==
The Plaza de Toros de Montserrat was the first bullfighting auditorium in the city of Buenos Aires. Previously the bullfighting spectacles had been made in the Plaza Mayor current Plaza de Mayo. Inaugurated in 1791, during the viceroyalty of Nicolás Antonio de Arredondo, it was located on the current streets of Belgrano and 9 de Julio, in the suburbs of the Montserrat neighborhood, populated at the time by neighbors of African descent.

The Plaza de Toros de Montserrat was closed in 1799, being replaced by Plaza de Toros del Retiro, located in the neighborhood of Retiro.
