= Plaza de Toros de Vista Alegre =

Bullring in Bilbao, Spain

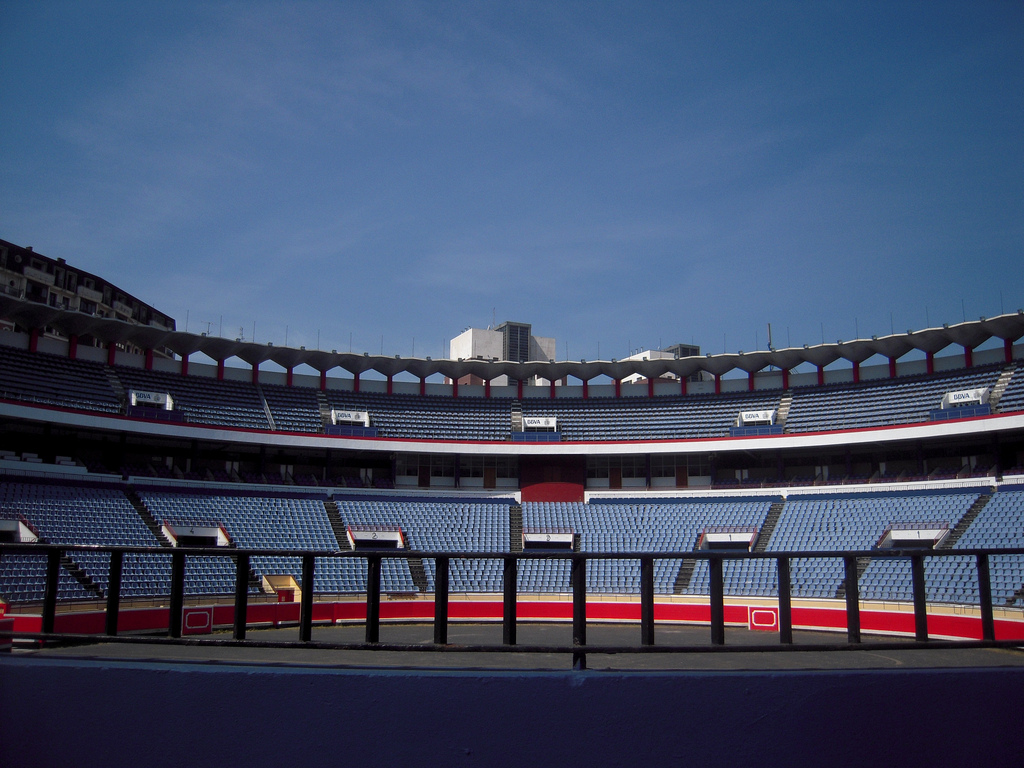
- Interactive map of Plaza de Toros de Vista Alegre
- Full name: Plaza de Toros de Bilbao
- Location: Bilbao, Spain
- Coordinates: 43°15′19″N 2°56′15″W
- Capacity: 14,781

Construction
- Opened: 1882
- Renovated: 1962

Plaza de Toros de Vista Alegre (officially Vista Alegre Zezen Plaza) is a bullring in Bilbao, Spain. It is currently used for bullfighting. The stadium was built in 1882 and holds 14,781 people.
