= Plaza de Toros de Zaragoza =

Bullring in Zaragoza, Spain

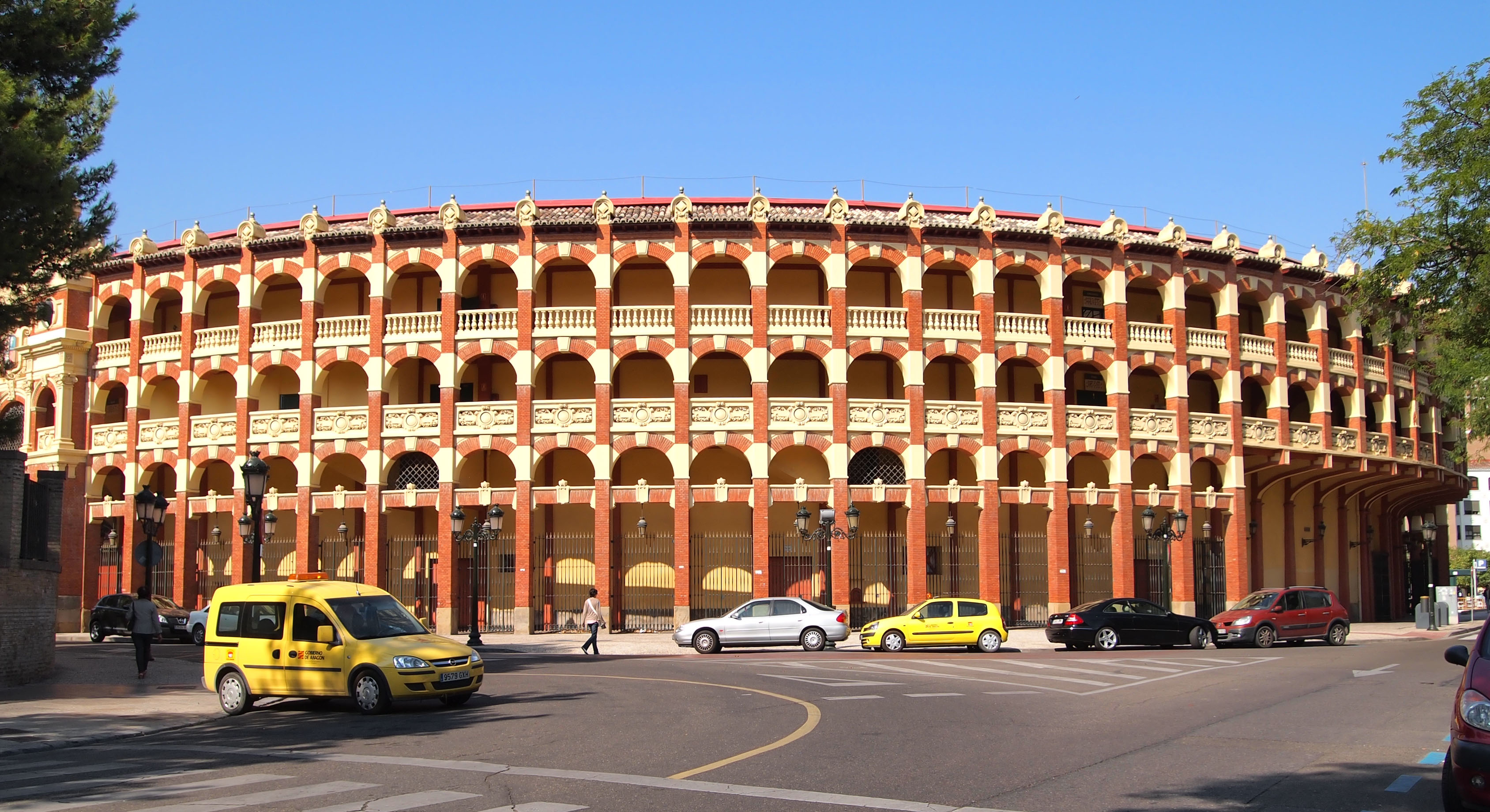
- Interactive map of Plaza de Toros de Zaragoza
- Full name: Plaza de Toros de Zaragoza
- Location: Zaragoza, Spain
- Coordinates: 41.6544°N 0.8916°W
- Capacity: 10,072

Construction
- Opened: 1764
- Renovated: 1916, 1989, 2002

Plaza de Toros de Zaragoza is a bullring in Zaragoza, Spain. It is currently used for bullfighting. The stadium holds 10,072 spectators. It was opened in 1764.
