= Plaza de Toros de Valencia =

Bullring in Valencia, Spain

Plaza de Toros de Valencia (Spanish) Plaça de Bous de València (Valencian)
- El Coso Valenciano
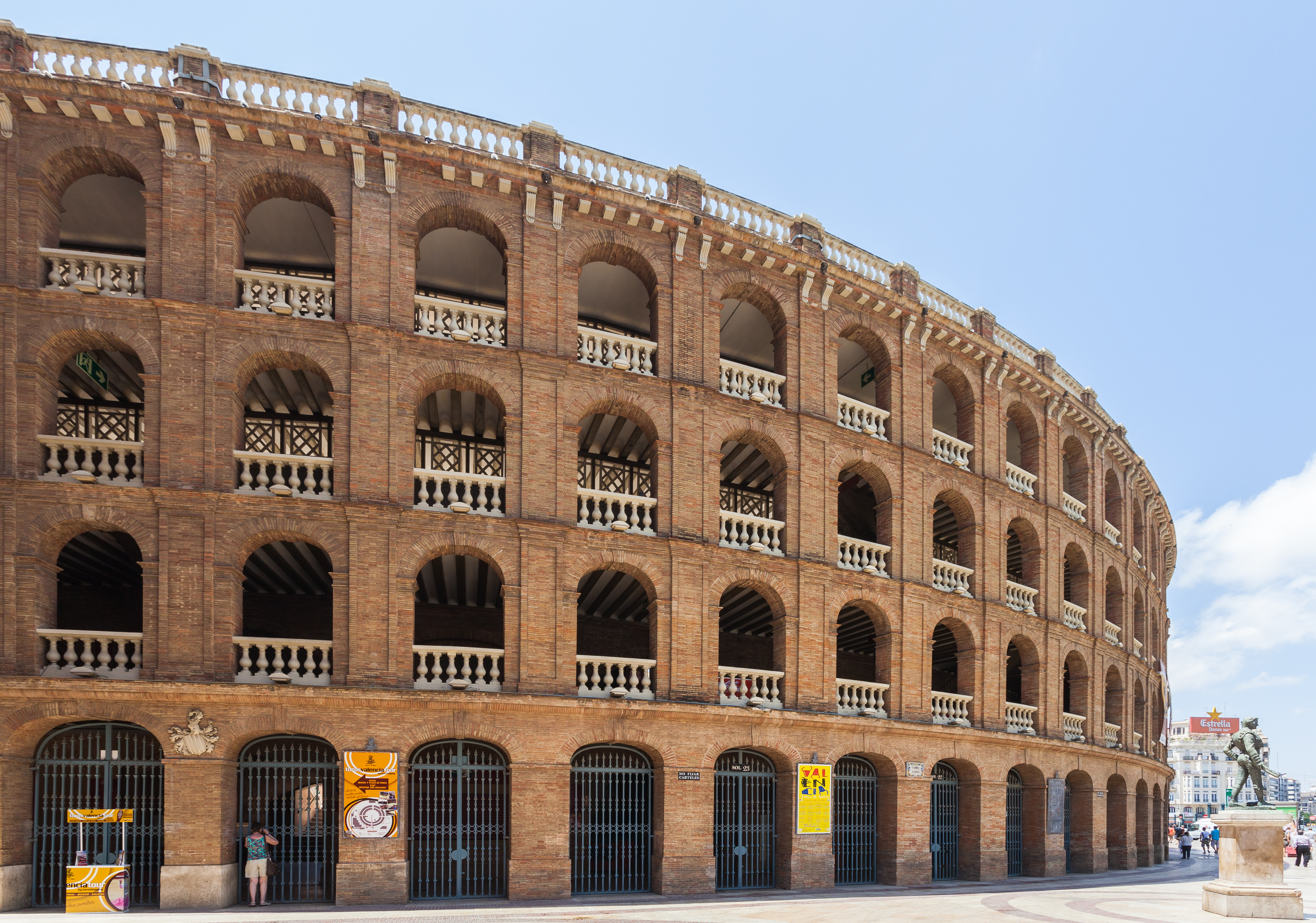
- Interactive map of Plaza de Toros de Valencia (Spanish); Plaça de Bous de València (Valencian)
- Location: Xàtiva Street, Valencia, Spain
- Coordinates: 39°28′00″N 0°22′35″W
- Owner: Hospital General de Valencia
- Capacity: 12,000
- Field size: 52 m inside diameter and 108 m outside

Construction
- Built: 1850–1859
- Opened: June 22, 1859
- Renovated: 1960
- Architect: Sebastián Monleón Estellés

Tenant
- Simon Casas Productions

Website
- torosvalenciatour.com

Plaza de Toros de Valencia, officially Plaça de Bous de València, is a bullring in Valencia, Spain. It was built between 1850 and 1859 in the neoclassical style, inspired by civil Roman architecture such as the Colosseum in Rome or the Arena of Nîmes (France). It was built by the Valencian architect Sebastián Monleón Estellés. Its structure is formed by a 48-sided polygon, with 384 external arches. It follows the so-called Neo-Mudéjar style.

== Features ==
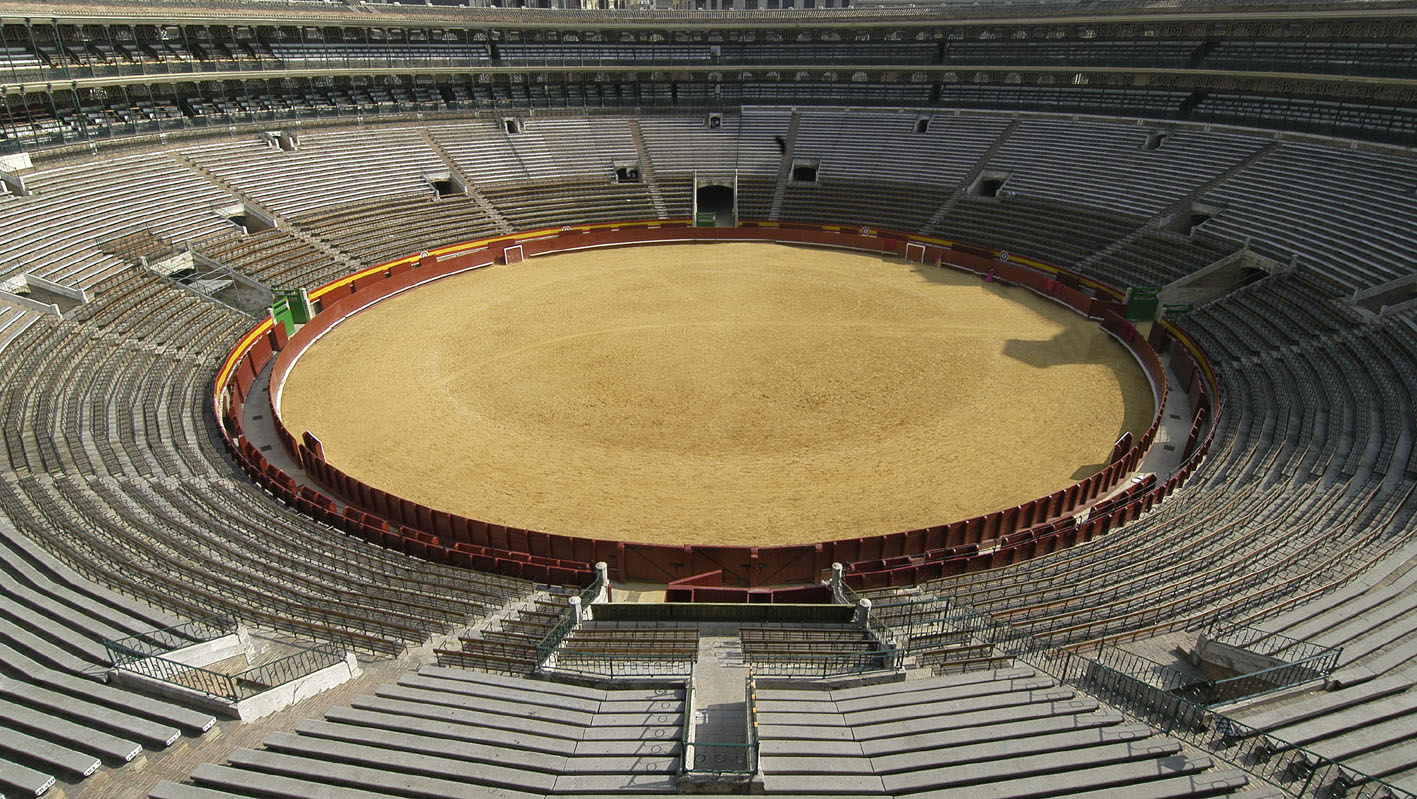
The Plaça de bous de València

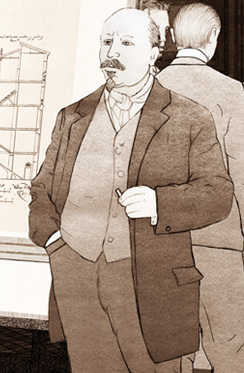
Sebastià Monleón Estellés (in Museu valencià d'Etnologia)

When constructed the bullfighting arena was outside the city walls near the Russafa Gate. The architect designed the 17.50 meter-high building with 48 sides. Originally the bullring had an inside diameter of 52 meters, which was later reduced. It is an early example of a building that used cast iron columns that provide remarkable transparency in the boxes. Plaza de Toros is one of the most beautiful bullrings in Spain, with an outside diameter of 108 meters and a capacity of 16,851 seated spectators (also reduced to 12,884 seats later on). These dimensions make it one of the largest bullrings in Spain. As reflected in the media at that time. It was inaugurated on June 20, 1859.

Since 1625, the site is owned by the Hospital General and it is administered by the Provincial Council of Valencia and the Simón Casas Productions company. Over the years, it has been managed both by private companies and the Council of Valencia itself.

== Location ==
The bullfighting arena is situated in the Central district of the city, at 28 Carrer de Xàtiva Valencia, 46004 Spain. It is located next to the North Station and also close to the Town Hall Square. Right in front of the bullring, there is a metro station called Xàtiva with the lines number 3, 5 and 9.

== Capacity ==
The bullring holds around 10,500 people.
