= Plaza de Toros Cañaveralejo =

Bullring in Cali, Colombia

Coordinates: 3°24′38.67″N 76°32′55.82″W

- Interactive map of Plaza de Toros Cañaveralejo
- Full name: Arena Cañaveralejo
- Location: Avenida Guadalupe, 3 Cali, Colombia
- Capacity: 16,954 (initial); 14,368 (2019–2020)

Construction
- Opened: 1957; 69 years ago

Tenant
- bullfighting

Website
- www.plazatoros.com

Plaza de Toros de Cali or Arena Cañaveralejo (official name) is a bullring in Cali, Colombia. It is used for bullfighting. Initial capacity was of 16,954 and it opened in 1957. Between 2019 and 2020 had update capacity of 14,368. It is located on Avenida Guadalupe, 3, Cali.
