= Plaza de Toros de Murcia =

Bullring in Murcia, Spain

Coordinates: 37.98526°N 1.122687°W

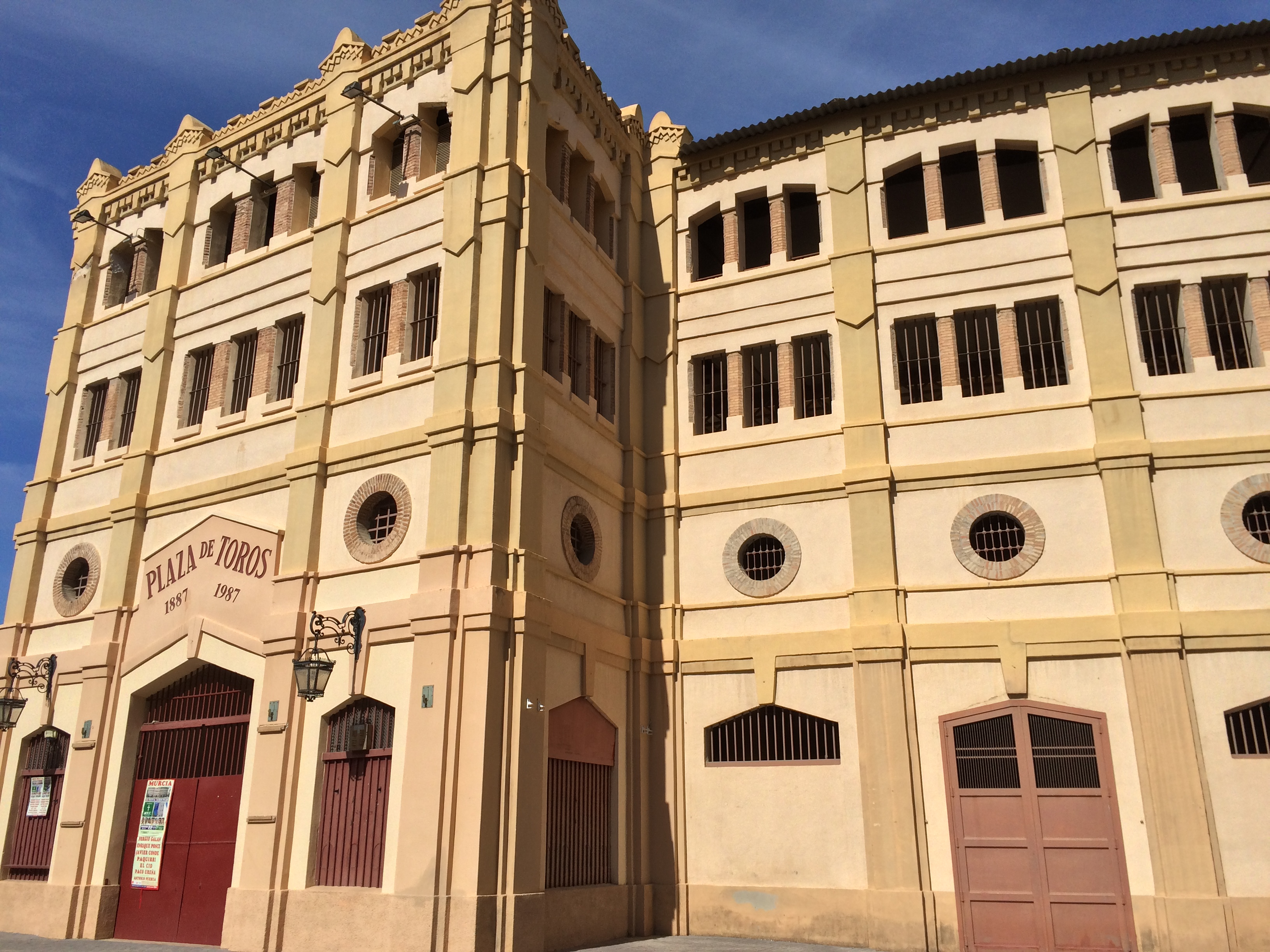
Main façade

The Plaza de Toros de Murcia (also known as the Plaza de Toros de La Condomina) is a bullring in Murcia, Spain. As of June 2015, it is used for bullfighting. The stadium holds 15,000 people. It was built in 1887.
