= Aire-sur-l'Adour =

Aire-sur-l'Adour Aira d'Ador (Occitan)
- Commune
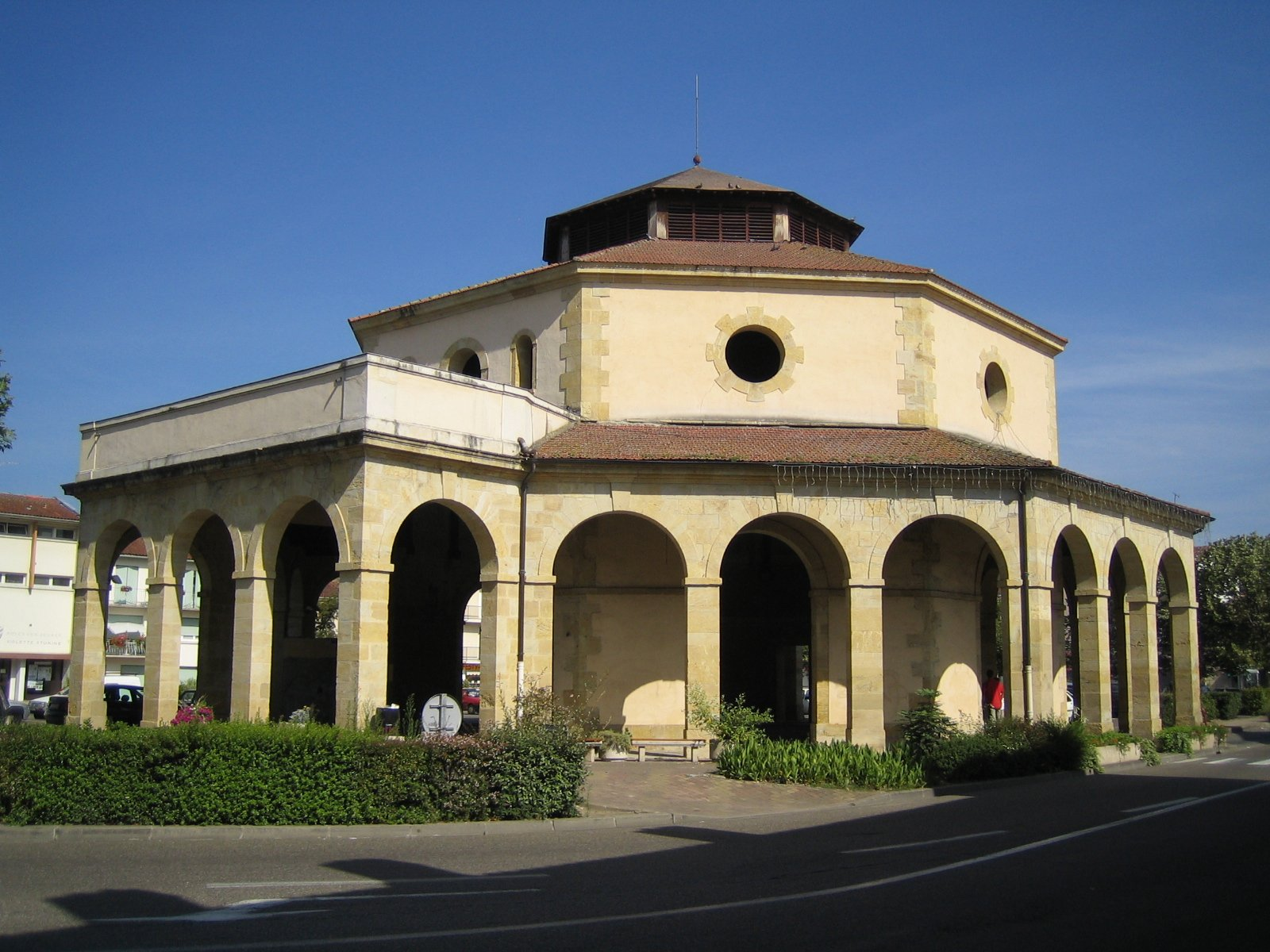
- Former market place

- Coat of arms
- Location of Aire-sur-l'Adour
- Location within France Location within Nouvelle-Aquitaine
- Coordinates: 43°42′N 0°16′W
- Country: France
- Region: Nouvelle-Aquitaine
- Department: Landes
- Arrondissement: Mont-de-Marsan
- Canton: Adour Armagnac
- Intercommunality: Aire-sur-l'Adour

Government
  - Mayor (2020–2026): Xavier Lagrave
- Area^{1}: 58 km^{2} (22 sq mi)
- Elevation: 80 m (260 ft)
- Highest elevation: 176 m (577 ft)
- Lowest elevation: 68 m (223 ft)
- Population (2023): 6,211
  - Density: 110/km^{2} (280/sq mi)
- Time zone: UTC+01:00 (CET)
  - Summer (DST): UTC+02:00 (CEST)
- INSEE/Postal code: 40001 /40800
- ^{1} French Land Register data, which excludes lakes, ponds, glaciers > 1 km^{2} (0.386 sq mi or 247 acres) and river estuaries.

Aire-sur-l'Adour (French: [ɛːʁ syʁ laduʁ]; Occitan: Aira d'Ador or simply Aira, before 1962: Aire) is a commune in the Landes department, Nouvelle-Aquitaine, southwestern France.

It lies on the river Adour in the wine area of southwest France. It is an episcopal see of the Diocese of Aire and Dax. The nearest large towns are Mont-de-Marsan to the north and Pau to the south.

== Geography ==
=== Location ===
Aire-sur-l'Adour is the largest town in the Tursan region, which occupies the southeastern corner of the Landes department. It borders the Gers department.

It is crossed by the D824 road, in the heart of the Tursan AOC vineyards, 150 kilometers south of Bordeaux, 50 kilometers north of Pau, and 30 kilometers southeast of Mont-de-Marsan, at the point where the Adour River enters the Landes department, at the junction of the Tursan, Armagnac, and Vic-Bilh regions.

=== Neighboring communes ===
The neighbouring communes are Bahus-Soubiran, Barcelonne-du-Gers, Bernède, Cazères-sur-l'Adour, Duhort-Bachen, Le Houga, Lannux, Latrille, Ségos, Sorbets and Vergoignan.

=== Villages and localities ===
The heart of the town is situated on both sides of the Adour River. The town hall, the shopping center, and the cathedral are located on the left bank. The two main localities outside the town center are Subéhargues, on the right bank, and the Mas district, which overlooks the left bank with the Church of Sainte-Quitterie. The main neighboring town is Barcelonne-du-Gers, which is part of the same urban area.

=== Hydrography ===
The Adour River flows through the town. The Buros stream, a right tributary of the Adour, also waters its land.

=== Climate ===
Several studies have been conducted to characterize the climatic types to which the national territory is exposed. The resulting zoning varies depending on the methods used, the nature and number of parameters considered, the territorial coverage of the data, and the reference period. In 2010, the commune's climate was classified as an altered oceanic climate, according to a study by the French National Centre for Scientific Research (CNRS) based on a method combining climatic data and environmental factors (topography, land use, etc.) and data covering the period 1971-2000. In 2020, the predominant climate was classified as Cfb, according to the Köppen-Geiger classification, for the period 1988-2017, namely a temperate climate with cool summers and no dry season. Furthermore, in 2020, Météo-France published a new climate typology for metropolitan France, in which the commune is exposed to an oceanic climate and is located in the Aquitaine-Gascogne climate region. This region is characterized by abundant rainfall in spring, moderate rainfall in autumn, low sunshine in spring, hot summers (19.5°C), light winds, frequent fog in autumn and winter, and frequent thunderstorms in summer (15 to 20 days). It is also located in zone H2c under the 2020 environmental regulations for new construction.

For the period 1971-2000, the average annual temperature was 12.6 °C, with an annual temperature range of 14.8 °C. The average annual rainfall was 1,024 mm, with 11.1 days of precipitation in January and 7.4 days in July. For the period 1991-2020, the average annual temperature observed at the nearest Météo-France weather station, located in the commune of Le Houga, 10 km away as the crow flies, was 13.8 °C, and the average annual rainfall was 875.9 mm. The maximum temperature recorded at this station was 41.1 °C, reached on 18 June 2022; the minimum temperature was -12.4 °C, reached on 27 January 2007.

== Urban planning ==
=== Typology ===
As of 1 January 2024, Aire-sur-l'Adour is categorized as a rural town, according to the new seven-level municipal population density scale defined by INSEE in 2022. It belongs to the urban unit of Aire-sur-l'Adour, an inter-regional agglomeration comprising two commune, of which it is the central town. Furthermore, the municipality is part of the Aire-sur-l'Adour catchment area, of which it is the central commune. This area, which includes 23 communes, is categorized as having fewer than 50,000 inhabitants.

=== Land use ===
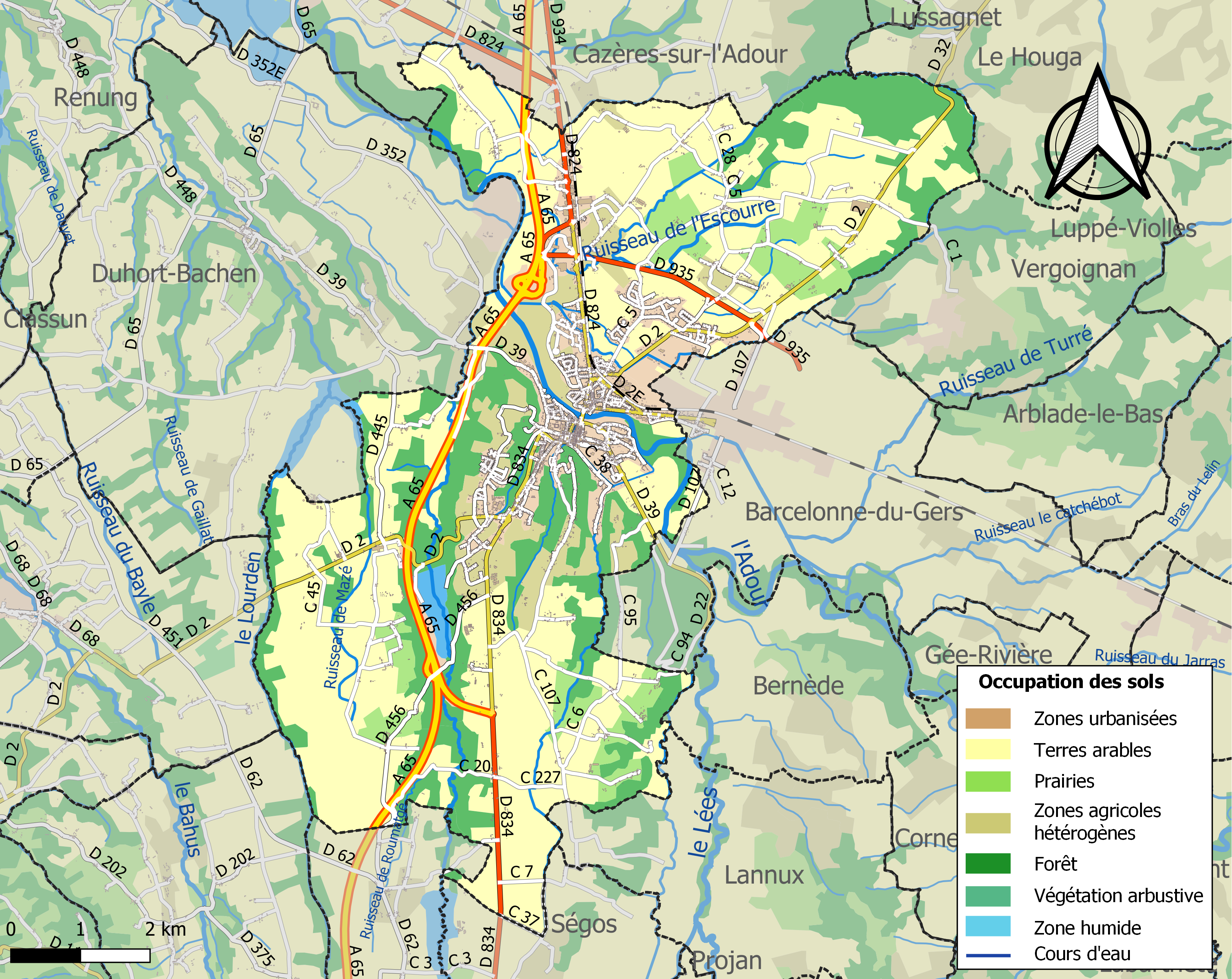
Map of infrastructure and land use of Aire-sur-l'Adour.

Land cover in the commune, as shown in the European biophysical land cover database Corine Land Cover (CLC), is characterized by the significant presence of agricultural land (66.4% in 2018), a decrease compared to 1990 (68.8%). The detailed breakdown in 2018 is as follows: arable land (52.1%), forests (21.6%), heterogeneous agricultural areas (8.2%), urbanized areas (7.3%), grasslands (6.1%), industrial or commercial areas and communication networks (3.4%), inland waters (0.8%), artificial, non-agricultural green spaces (0.4%), mines, landfills and construction sites (0.1%). The evolution of land use in the commune and its infrastructure can be observed on the different cartographic representations of the territory: the Cassini map (18th century), the general staff map (1820-1866) and the maps or aerial photos of the IGN for the current period (1950 to today).

=== Major risks ===
The territory of the commune of Aire-sur-l'Adour is vulnerable to various natural hazards: weather-related events (storms, thunderstorms, snow, extreme cold, heat waves, or drought), floods, landslides, and earthquakes (low seismicity). It is also exposed to two technological risks: the transport of hazardous materials and industrial risks. A website published by the BRGM (French Geological Survey) allows for a simple and quick assessment of the risks associated with a property located either by its address or by its parcel number.

==== Natural risks ====
Certain parts of the commune are susceptible to flooding from overflowing waterways, particularly the Adour, the Broussau, the Escourre stream, and the Lourden. The commune has been declared a natural disaster area due to damage caused by floods and mudslides in 1999, 2006, 2009, 2014, and 2020.

The ground movements likely to occur within the commune are differential settlements.

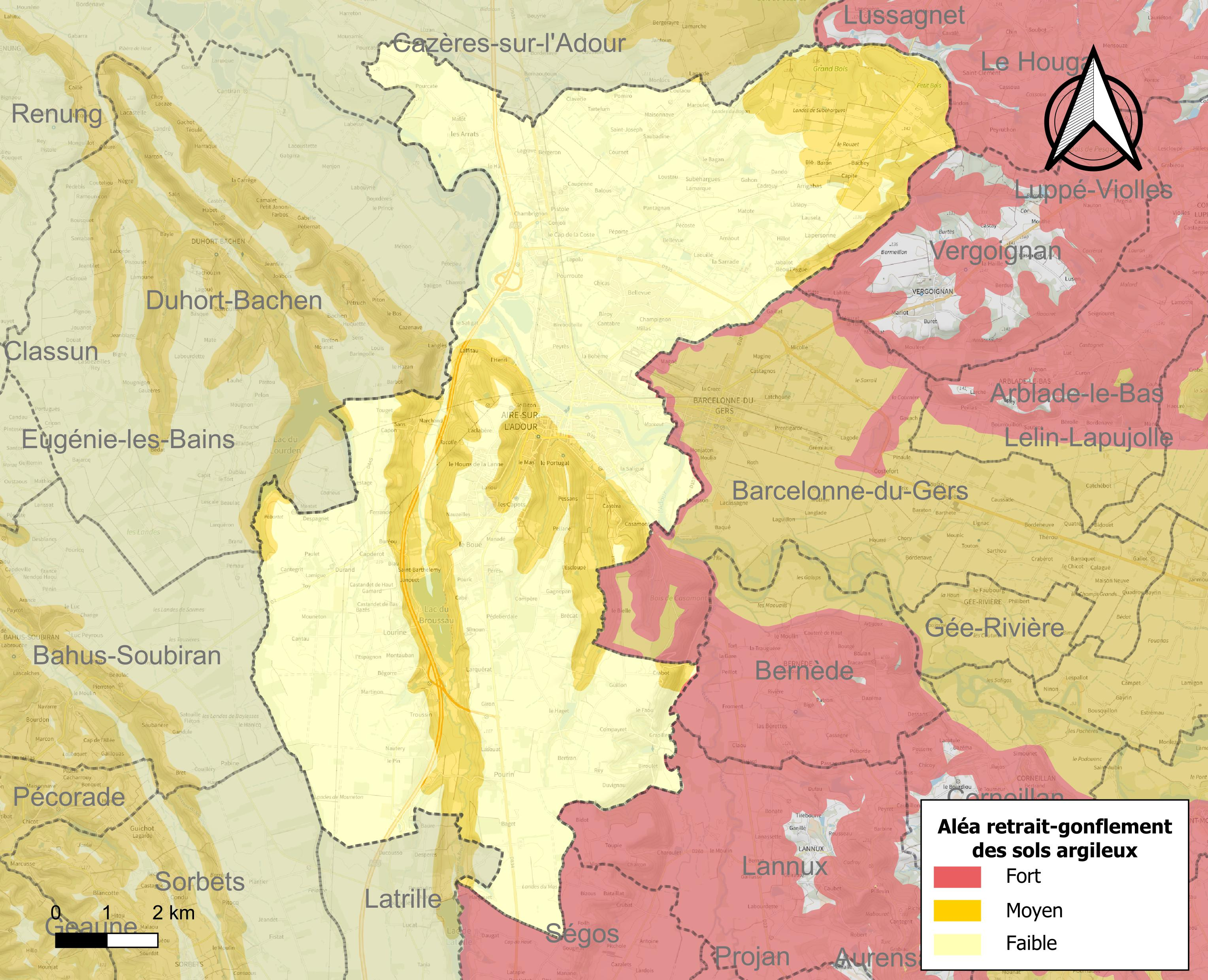
Map of the shrink-swell hazard zones of clay soils in Aire-sur-l'Adour.

The shrinking and swelling of clay soils can cause significant damage to buildings in the event of alternating periods of drought and rain. 26% of the commune's area is at medium or high risk (19.2% at the departmental level and 48.5% at the national level). Of the 2,545 buildings counted in the commune in 2019, 465 were at medium or high risk, representing 18%, compared to 17% at the departmental level and 54% at the national level. A map of the national territory's exposure to clay soil shrinking and swelling is available on the BRGM website.

Regarding landslides, the commune was recognized as a natural disaster area due to damage caused by drought in 1989 and 2002 and by landslides in 1999.

==== Technological risks ====
The commune is exposed to industrial risk due to the presence of a company subject to the European SEVESO Directive within its territory.

The risk of hazardous materials being transported through the commune is linked to its crossing by one or more major road or rail infrastructures, or the presence of a hydrocarbon pipeline. An accident occurring on such infrastructure is likely to have serious effects on property, people, or the environment, depending on the nature of the material being transported. Urban planning measures may be recommended accordingly.

== Name ==
Attested in the form civitate Vicojuli or Vicus Julii in 56 BC, a Latin compound of vicus "village" and the gentilicium of Julius Caesar.

The full name of the town is a pleonastic toponym, meaning it combines two elements designating the same thing: the name Aire (Atura) is derived from the name Adour, as indicated by the name of the inhabitants (Aturins).

This name is, in a way, the Frenchification of a Latinized Basque toponym. Indeed, the original name Atura is the Latin translation of Aturri, the Basque name for the Adour River. This name evolved as follows: Atura > Atra > Aira > Aire, and is in fact linked to the Aquitanian people of the Aturenses.

Its Gascon name is written either Aira according to the classical Occitan norm (or Alibertine orthography), or Ayre using the Fébusian orthography (related to the Mistralian norm).

The town was officially called "Aire" until April 1962, before adopting its current name.

== History ==
=== Antiquity ===
Before the Roman era, an oppidum called Atura existed on the site of Aire. From this name, borrowed from the Adour River, derive both the name of the town of Aire and that of the Tursan region (pagus aturensis). It was inhabited by the Aquitanian people of the Tarusates (Proto-Basques).

Capital of the subjugated peoples around 56 BC by Crassus, lieutenant of Julius Caesar, the name of Aire, and particularly of its town, was Romanized to Vicus Julii. Two Roman altars, one dedicated to Mars, were discovered there by Émile Taillebois in 1884.

=== Visigoths ===
In the 5th century, Aire was part of the Visigothic kingdom of Toulouse; it became a royal residence under Kings Euric (466-484) and Alaric II (484-507). In 470, Euric, an Arian, issued orders from Aire against the Nicene churches.

In February 506, Alaric II convened an assembly of bishops and nobles, as well as jurists, in Aire, where they established a collection of laws for the Gallo-Romans of the kingdom, largely inspired by the Theodosian Code (438), that is, Roman law. Alaric's breviary would later influence medieval Roman law. A year later, Alaric was defeated by Clovis at the Battle of Vouillé.

It was in 476 that Quitterie, a Catholic princess of Spain, daughter of "King" Caius, who was fleeing her suitor, was allegedly beheaded in Aire by the Visigoths, adherents of Arianism, a heresy. Her head is said to have caused a miraculous spring to gush forth. Legends concerning Saint Quitterie are numerous and suggest various origins (Spain, Galicia, Portugal, or the Visigothic kingdom of Toulouse); in any case, no historical sources exist. Her cult was widespread in Vasconia (pronounced "Quiteri"), where she was believed to cure headaches, madness, and rabies. Aire became the seat of a bishopric.

=== The Bishopric ===
The presence of a representative of Marcellus, Bishop of Aire, at the Council of Agde in 506, suggests a long history of an episcopal see in this location. Aire lost its bishopric during the French Revolution. At the beginning of the 19th century, a reorganization of the dioceses of France (Concordats of 1801 and 1817) united the dioceses of Aire and Dax. The main seat of the bishopric was officially transferred in 1933 to Dax, a larger city better served by rail. The cathedral of Aire holds the title of Co-Cathedral.

=== Middle Ages ===
It was in Aire, but down below, in the fortified city bordering the Adour, that an agreement was made in the 12th century between the King of England, Edward I, and the Bishop of Aire, one granting his protection, the other a share of his revenues.

=== The pilgrimage to Compostela ===
Aire-sur-l'Adour is a stop on the Via Podiensis of the pilgrimage to Santiago de Compostela. The next stop is Miramont-Sensacq. Historically, the previous stop, 27 km away, was Nogaro.

In Aire-sur-l'Adour, there were two hospitals for pilgrims, including the Manso Hospital, located at the bottom of the street leading up to the Church of Sainte-Quitterie, now Rue Félix-Despagnet. There, pilgrims were welcomed, fed, cared for, and comforted.

The pilgrim hospitals were run by confraternities of the Way of St. James, composed in each town of those who had made the pilgrimage. In this way, they gave back what they had received, thus perpetuating the tradition. They welcomed pilgrims passing through their town and prepared those who were about to set off. These hospitals were also run by hospitaller orders of chivalry.

=== Contemporary history ===
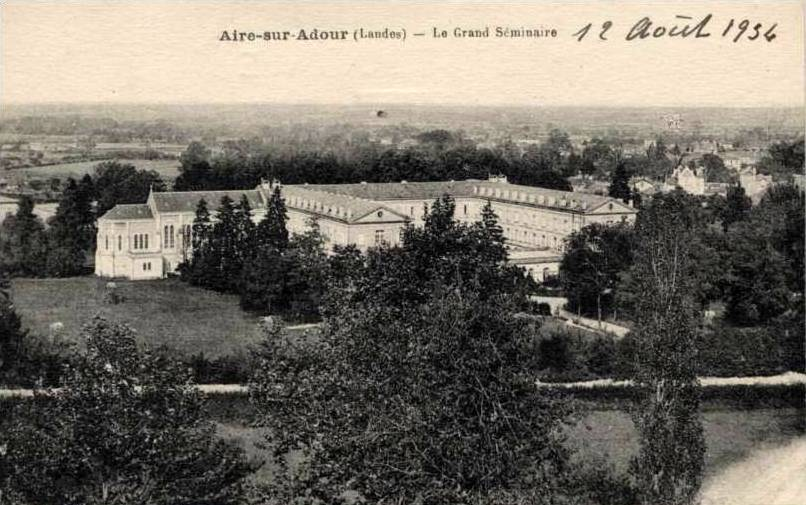
The Grand Seminary, later the Jean-Sarrailh center, before the fire of 1982.

Between 1790 and 1794, Aire absorbed the short-lived commune of Le Mas.

On 2 March 1814, Wellington's English and Portuguese troops, advancing from Spain, won a battle against Marshal Soult's forces on the heights southwest of the town, resulting in several hundred deaths. It went down in history as the Battle of Aire-sur-l'Adour.

On 25 May 1982, the arson attack on a medical-educational center for young people with psychiatric disorders, the Jean-Sarrailh Center, killed 24 people, including 21 children. The previous evening, a documentary entitled "Should We Burn Down Psychiatric Hospitals?" had been broadcast on television.

In the 2000s, a bypass allowed long-distance traffic to avoid the town center. This bypass was incorporated into the route of the A65 autoroute.

Famed Spanish bullfighter Iván Fandiño died at the Arènes Maurice-Lauche in Aire-sur-l'Adour after being gored by a bull on 17 June 2017.

== Economy ==
- Aire-sur-l'Adour has been home to a balloon launch site affiliated with CNES (the French National Centre for Space Studies) since 1966. Dozens of stratospheric balloons (BSOs) were launched from the town until 2007, due to regulatory changes that complicated overflights of populated areas in southwestern France. The site continues to launch smaller balloons.
- Potez: aeronautical construction. This factory was founded in 1936 by Gaston Fouga to produce Pierre Mauboussin's M.123 Corsaire aircraft.
- The Maurice-Lauche bullring, inaugurated in 1972, can hold 4,500 people. It is used for both Spanish and Landes-style bullfighting.
- Viticulture: Saint-Mont (AOC).
- Town center with shops.
- Tourist office.
- Shopping center.
- Poult Biscuit Factory (closed in 2022 due to economic reasons)
- Recycling Center (Landes Recycling Center)
- Gascogne Energies Services (formerly the Aire-sur-l'Adour Municipal Authorities, founded in 1926). A local distribution company that produces, supplies, and manages gas and electricity distribution networks in the Landes, Gers, and Pyrénées-Atlantiques departments.

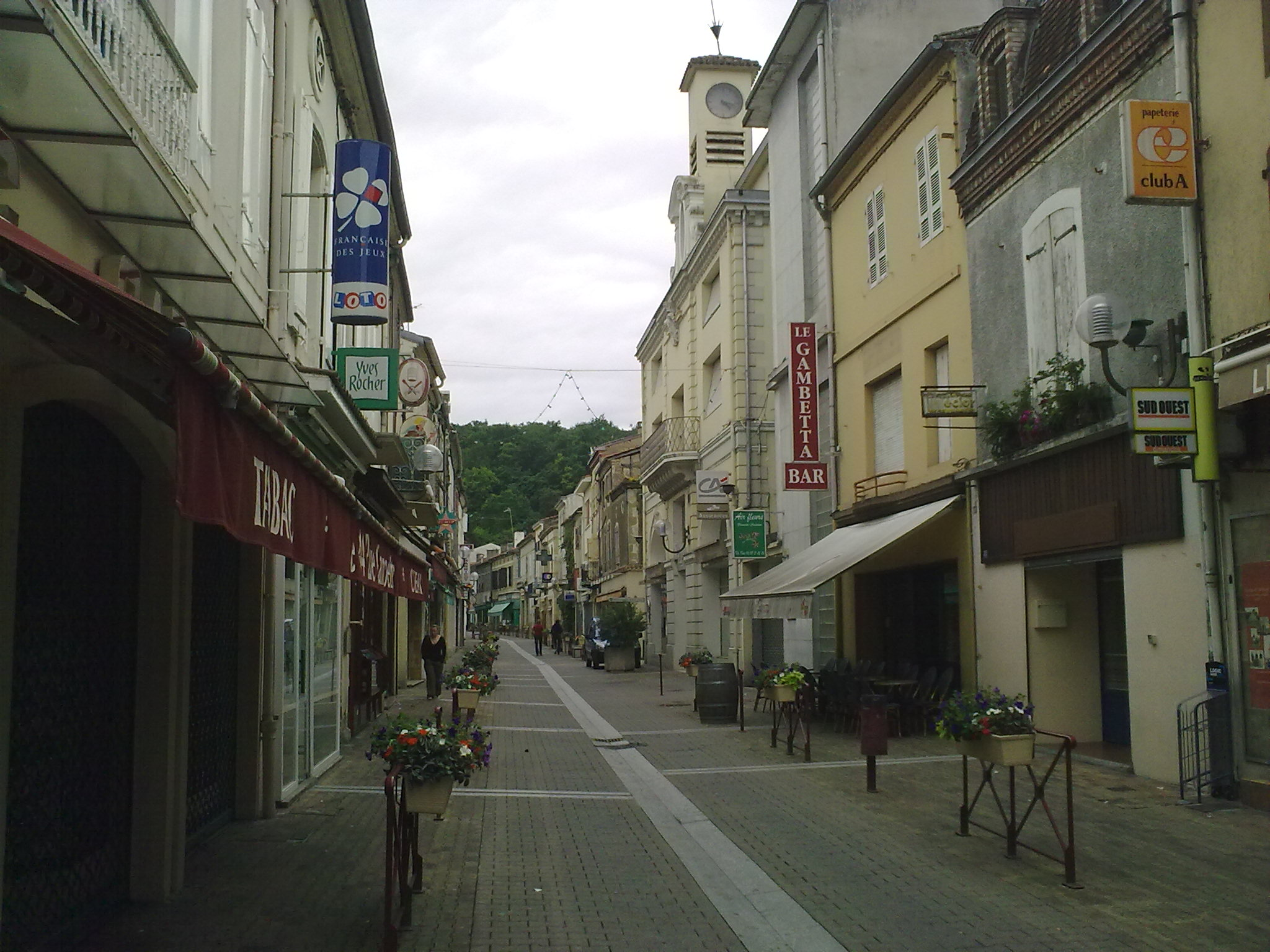
Aire-sur-l'Adour town centre.

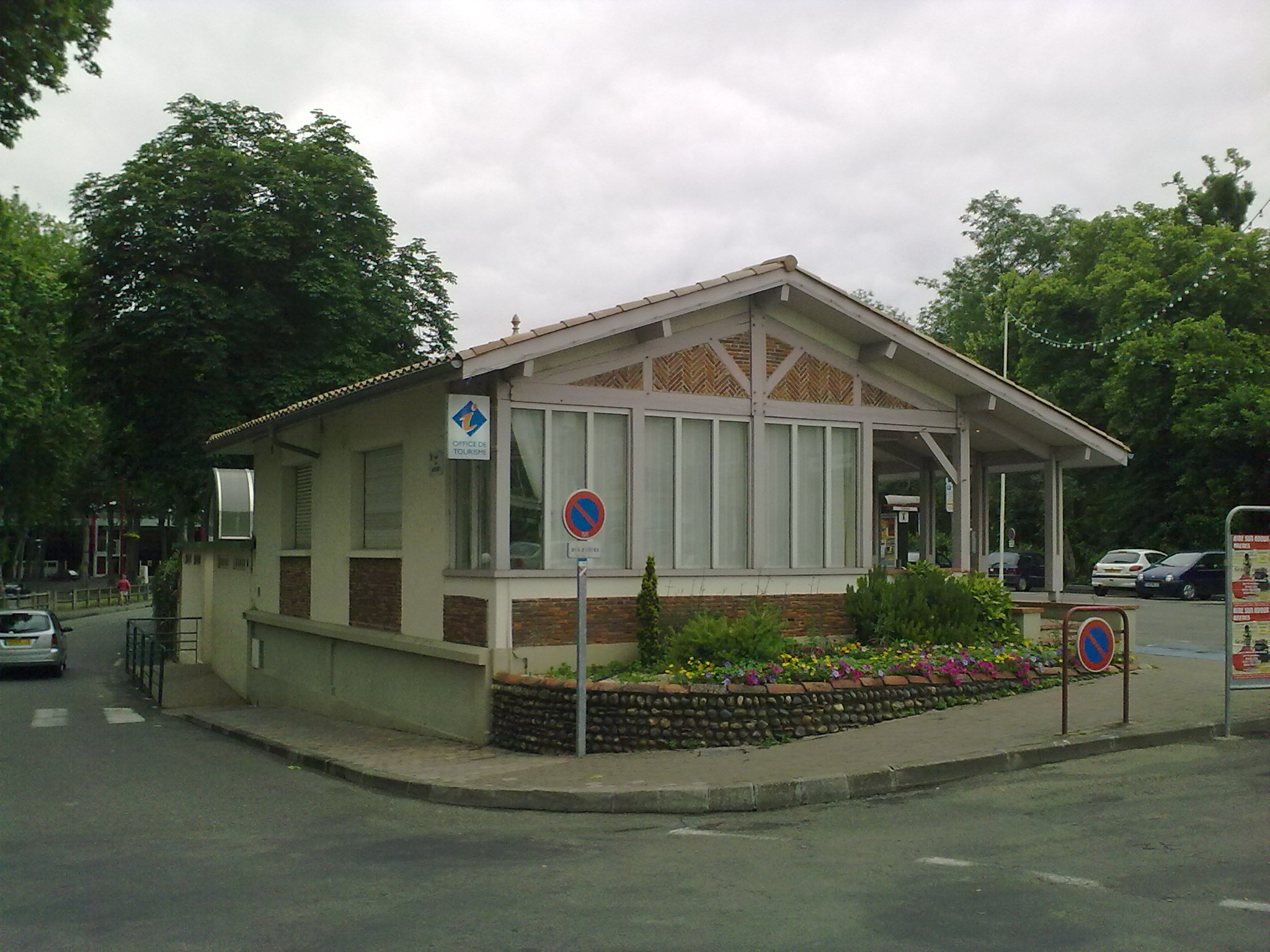
Aire-sur-l'Adour Tourist Office.

== Heraldry ==
Coat of arms of Aire-sur-l'Adour	Quarterly: 1st and 4th Or, a lion with a forked tail Azure; 2nd and 3rd Gules, a lion purpure; all on a chief Azure a fleur-de-lis Or. Officially adopted in 2003.

== Culture and sights ==
=== Places and monuments ===
==== Civil buildings ====
The town hall (since 1927) occupies part of the former bishop's palace. It is a 17th-century building with a stone staircase and coffered ceilings, and a round tower with a 16th-century staircase topped by a pepperpot roof.

The small archaeological museum in the town hall houses carved scallop shells.

The 14th-century Officiality House, listed as a historical monument on 22 February 1946, located at 6 rue Labeyrie, with its mullioned windows, was the court where the Jurats (judges) presided.

The five-arched stone bridge over the Adour River dates from 1834, several earlier bridges having been swept away by the river; it was widened in 1961. The south quay and the banks of the Adour have been developed into a promenade leading to the bullring.

The octagonal grain market in Aire-sur-l'Adour, with its large stone arches, dates from 1860; it was listed as a historical monument on 29 October 1975.

A monument commemorating two innocent people killed in 1944 stands near the war memorial.

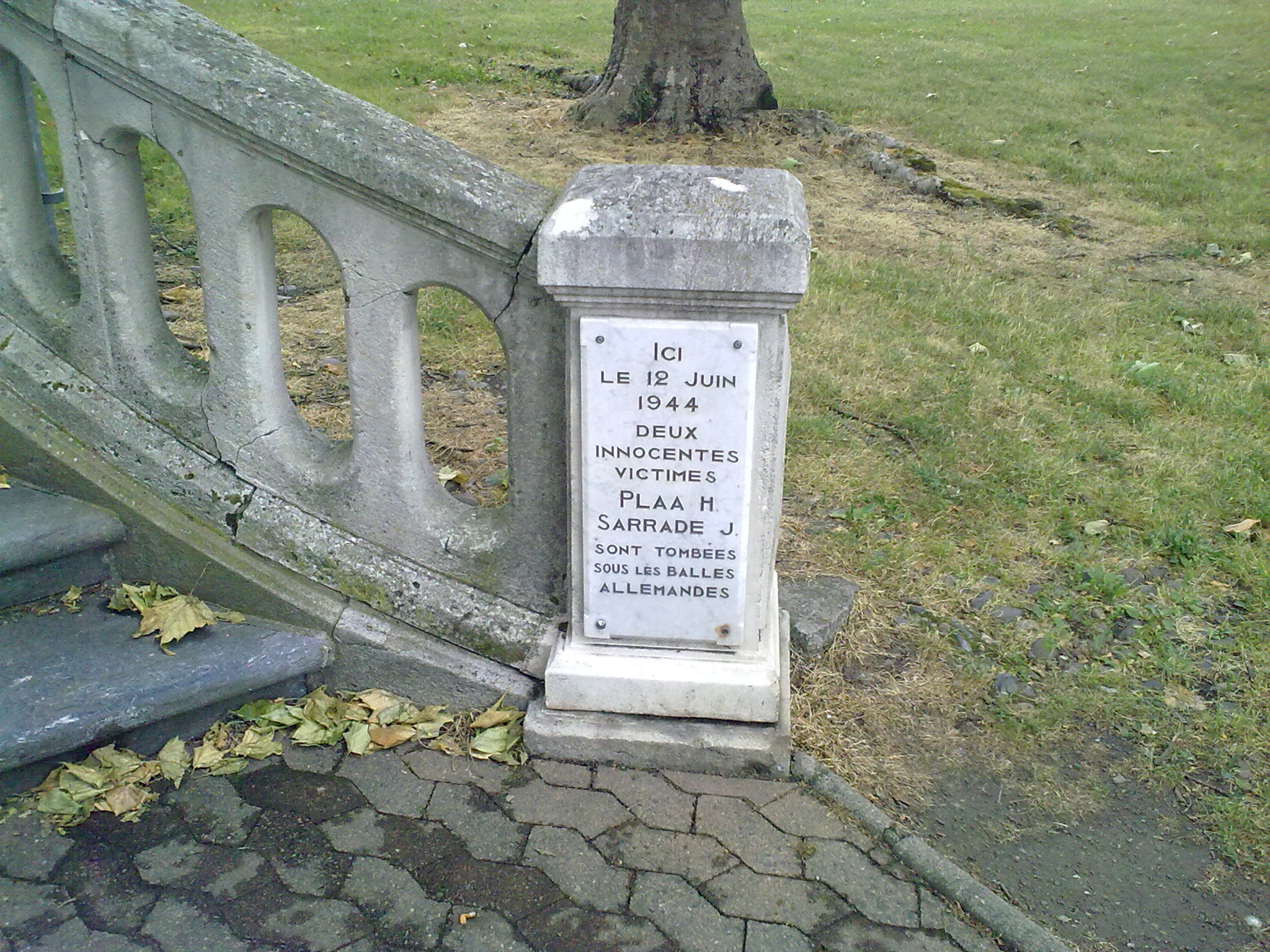
Memorial to a place from 1944 near the bridge over the Adour in Aire-sur-l'Adour.

Arènes Maurice-Lauche

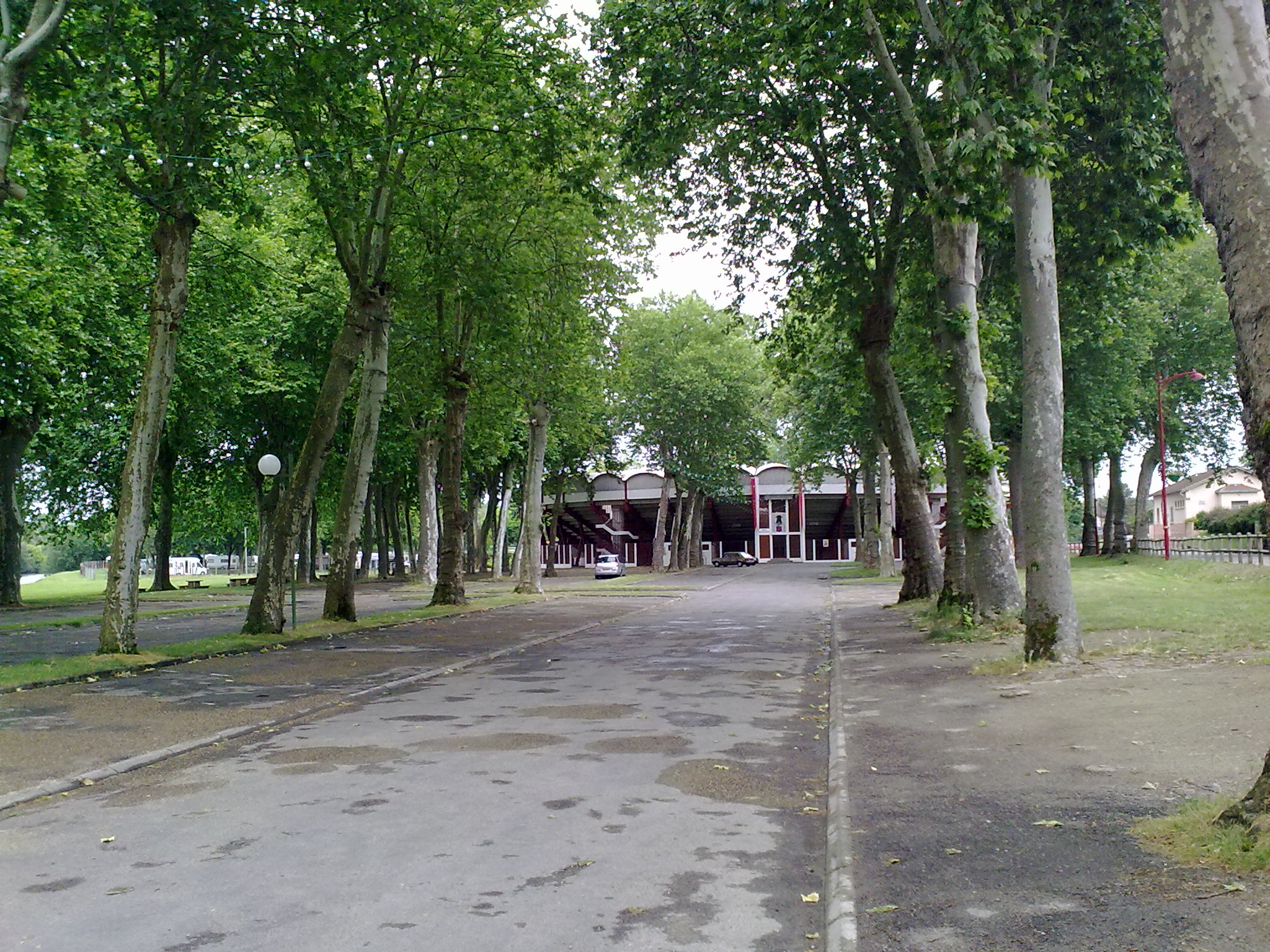
The arenas of Aire-sur-l'Adour.

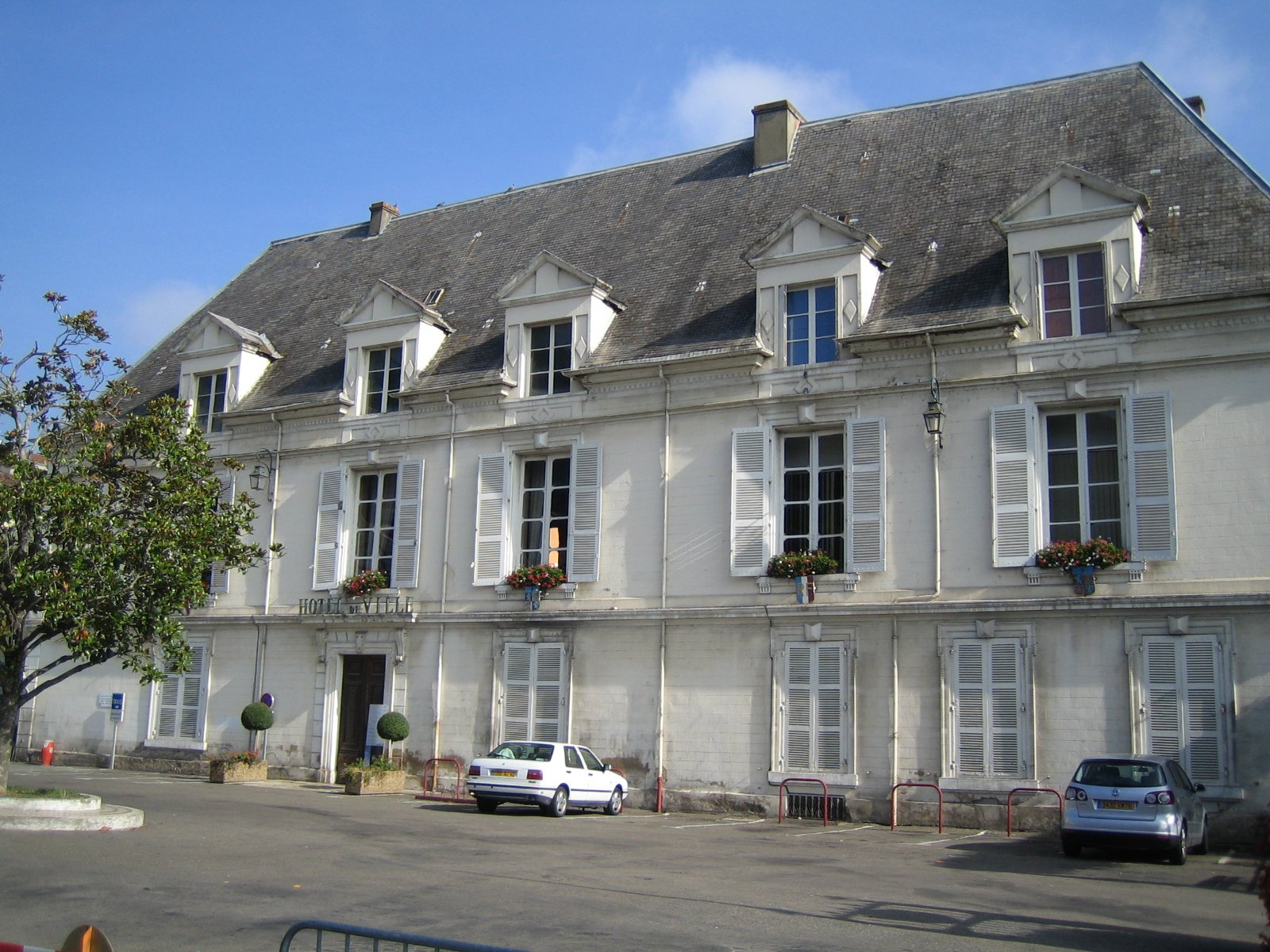
The town hall of Aire-sur-l'Adour.

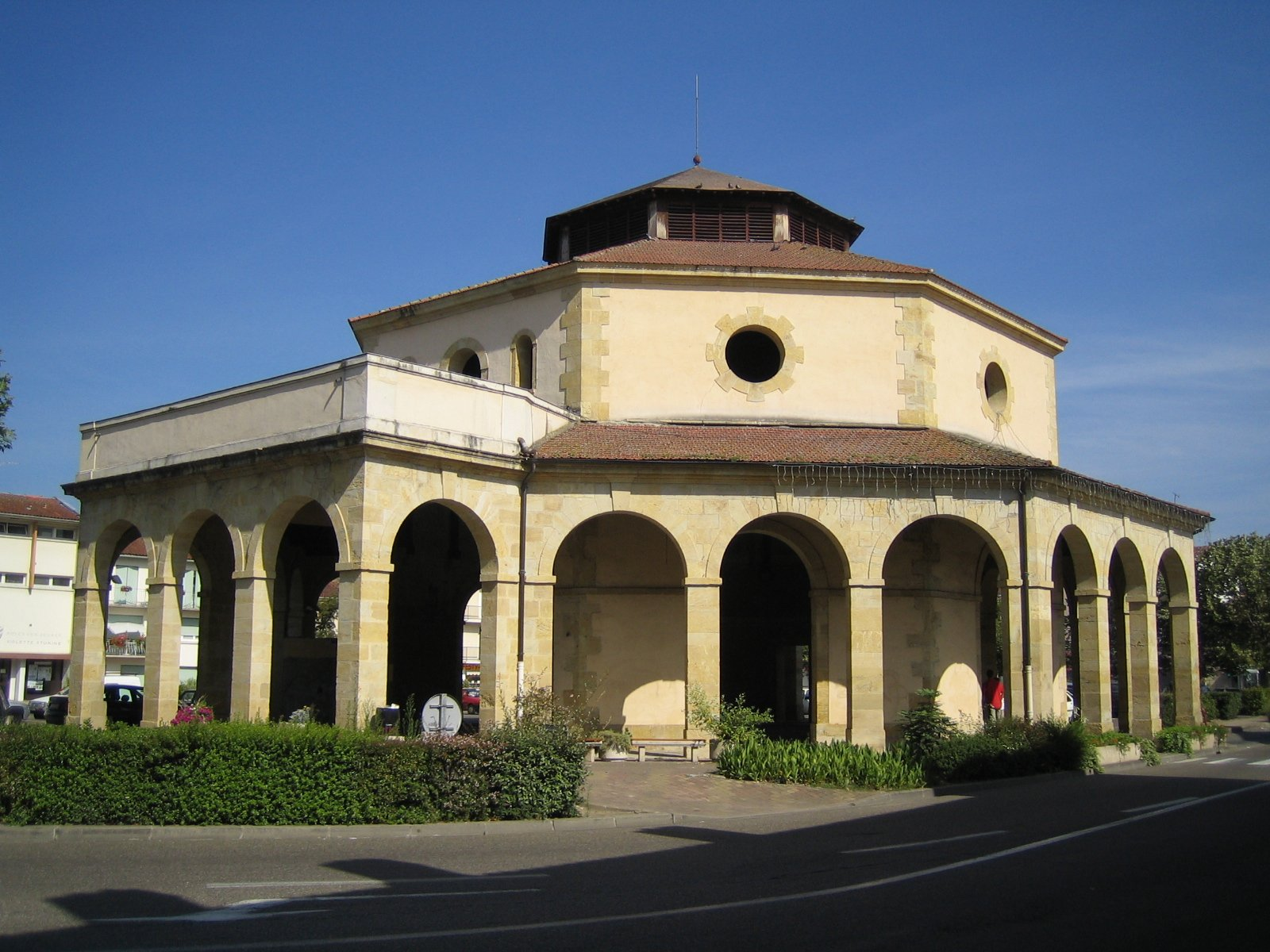
The grain market in Aire-sur-l'Adour.

==== Religious buildings ====
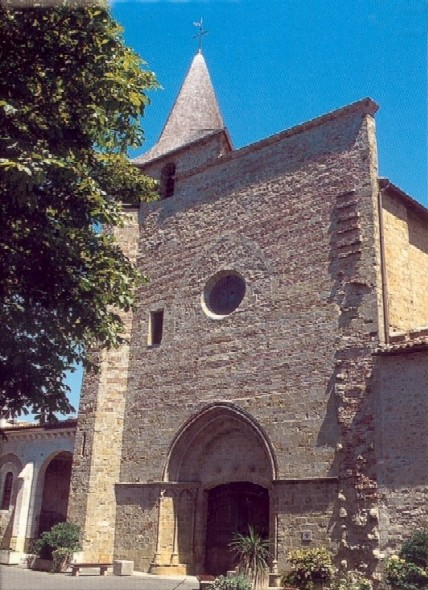
The former Saint-Jean-Baptiste Cathedral of Aire. The tree visible in the photo has since been cut down.

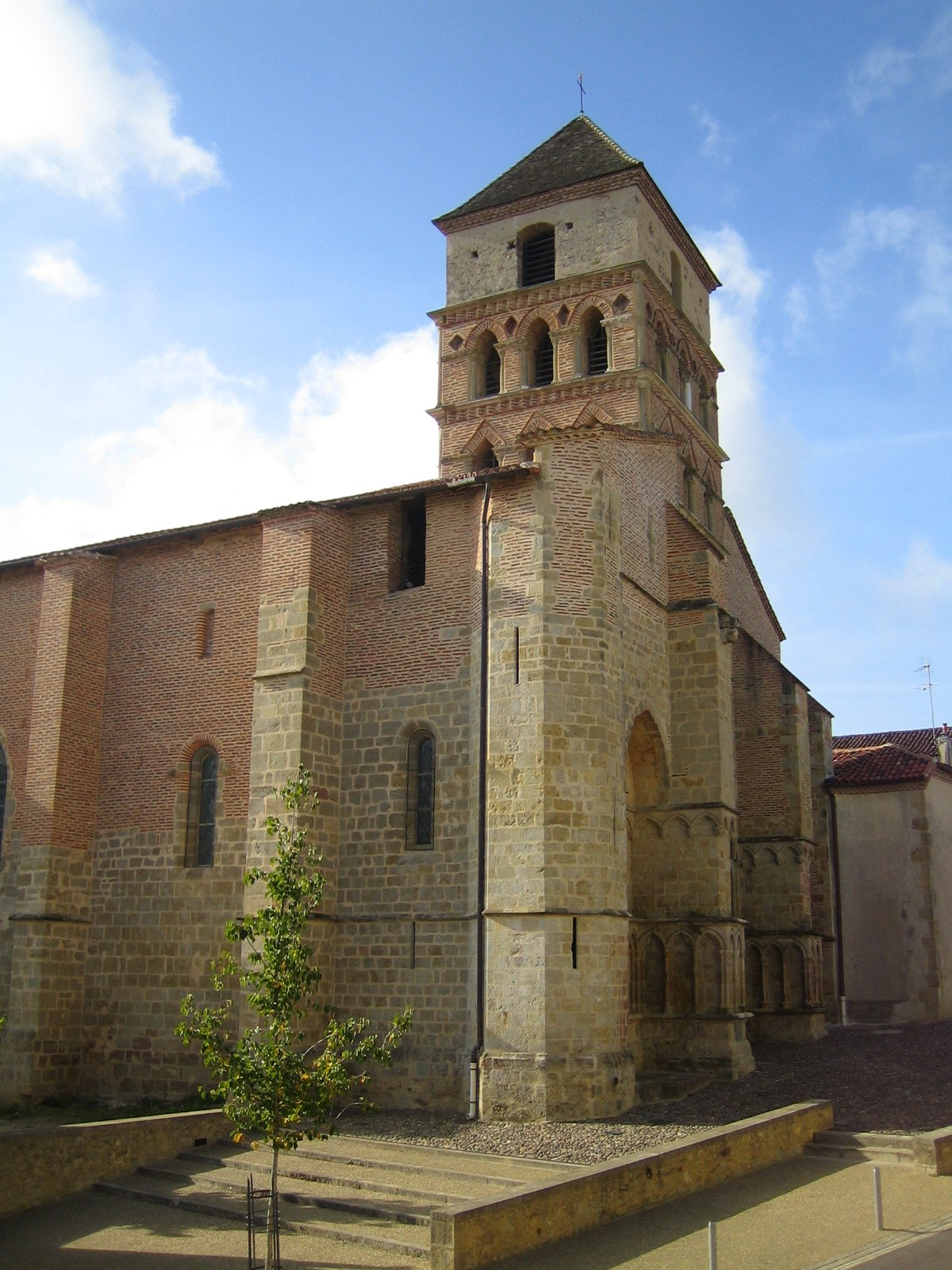
Saint Quitterie Church

- Saint John the Baptist Cathedral, on Rue Gambetta (diocese of Aire and Dax), listed as a historical monument by decree of 9 August 1906, and its organ dating from 1758.
- Saint Quitterie Church, on Rue Félix-Despagnet. Located on the Mas hill, southwest of the town, it is in the Gothic style of the 13th-14th centuries, except for the apse which dates from the late 11th or early 12th century. It was listed as a historical monument in 1840 and is also a UNESCO World Heritage Site as part of the Routes of Santiago de Compostela. A white marble sarcophagus from the late Roman period, known as the Saint Quitterie sarcophagus, is located in the church's crypt.
- Our Lady of Subéhargues Church, on the local road in Subéhargues.
- Carmelite Church of Saint Joseph, rue Maubec, listed as a historical monument by decree of 20 January 2009.
- Former Ursuline Chapel, rue du Petit-Séminaire, converted into a guesthouse.
- Retirement home chapel, rue de Prat.
- Assembly of God, route de Bordeaux.
- Kingdom Hall of Jehovah's Witnesses, route du Houga.

=== Cultural facilities ===
The Aire-sur-l'Adour community library network is built around three facilities: the Aire-sur-l'Adour community library, the Barcelonne-du-Gers community library, and the Eugénie-les-Bains community library. It was awarded the Grand Prix Livres Hebdo for Francophone libraries in 2014.

== Population ==
Historical population
Year	Pop.	±% p.a.
1968	5,665	—
1975	5,896	+0.57%
1982	6,242	+0.82%
1990	6,205	−0.07%
1999	6,003	−0.37%
2007	6,070	+0.14%
2012	6,136	+0.22%
2017	6,129	−0.02%
2023	6,211	+0.22%
Source: INSEE

== Personalities ==
- Pierrette Le Pen, mother of Marine Le Pen and ex-wife of Jean-Marie Le Pen
- Florian Cazalot, rugby union player, born 1985 in Aire-sur-l'Adour

== Twin towns ==
- Castro-Urdiales, Spain
