= Cazalot =

Cazalot is a surname. Notable people with the surname include:

- Clarence P. Cazalot Jr. (born 1950), American energy industry executive
- Florian Cazalot (born 1985), French rugby union player

== See also ==
- Cazalet
