= Community Identification Number =

Geocodes for mumicipalities in Germany

A Community Identification Number (also known as an Official Municipality Key, Official Municipality Characteristic Number or Municipality Code Number) is a number sequence for the identification of politically independent municipalities or unincorporated areas in Germany. Other classifications for the identification of areas include postal codes, NUTS codes or FIPS codes.

== Germany ==
Map of Germany with its countries (numbers by the Community Identification Number of Germany)

In Germany the Official Municipality Key serves statistical purposes and is issued by the statistics offices of individual German states. The municipality key is to be indicated in instances such as changing residence on the notice of departure or registration documents. This is done at the registration office in every town's city hall.

=== Structure ===
The municipality key consists of eight digits, which are generated as follows: The first two digits designate the individual German state. The third digit designates the government district (in areas without government districts a zero is used instead). The fourth and fifth digits designate the number of the urban area (in a district-free city) or the district (in a city with districts). The sixth, seventh, and eighth digits indicate the municipality or the number of the unincorporated area.

==== Examples ====
08 1 11 000: Stuttgart

- 08: Baden-Württemberg
- 1: Government district of Stuttgart
- 11: Urban area of Stuttgart
- 000: No other municipality is available, since Stuttgart is an urban area

15 3 52 002: Aschersleben

- 15: Saxony-Anhalt
- 3: Government district of Magdeburg
- 52: District of Aschersleben Staßfurt
- 002: City of Aschersleben

=== Federal States ===
- 01: Schleswig-Holstein
- 02: Hamburg
- 03: Lower Saxony
- 04: Bremen
- 05: North Rhine-Westphalia
- 06: Hesse
- 07: Rhineland-Palatinate
- 08: Baden-Württemberg
- 09: Bavaria
- 10: Saarland
- 11: Berlin
- 12: Brandenburg
- 13: Mecklenburg-Vorpommern
- 14: Saxony
- 15: Saxony-Anhalt
- 16: Thuringia

== Austria ==
Map of administrative divisions of Austria

=== Structure ===
The municipality identifier consists of five digits in Austria, which are generated as follows: The first digit designates the number of the Austrian state, the second and third digits designate the district, and the fourth and fifth digits designate the municipality.

==== Examples ====
3 25 21: Rappottenstein

- 3: Lower Austria
- 25: Zwettl district
- 21: Municipality of Rappottenstein

9 07 01: Vienna - Neubau

- 9: Vienna
- 07: Neubau (7th district)
- 01: District of Neubau

=== Federal States ===
- 1 Burgenland
- 2 Carinthia
- 3 Lower Austria
- 4 Upper Austria
- 5 Salzburg
- 6 Styria
- 7 Tyrol
- 8 Vorarlberg
- 9 Vienna

== Switzerland ==
=== Structure ===
The Swiss Federal Statistical Office generates code numbers with up to four digits, which are sequentially assigned in accordance with the official order of the cantons, districts, and municipalities.

=== Cantons ===
Canton	Range
Canton of Zurich	0001-0261
Canton of Bern	0301-0996
Canton of Lucerne	1001-1150
Canton of Uri	1201-1220
Canton of Schwyz	1301-1375
Canton of Obwalden	1401-1407
Canton of Nidwalden	1501-1511
Canton of Glarus	1601-1629
Canton of Zug	1701-1711
Canton of Fribourg	2001-2336
Canton of Solothurn	2401-2622
Canton of Basel-Stadt	2701-2703
Canton of Basel-Landschaft	2761-2895
Canton of Schaffhausen	2901-2974
Canton of Appenzell Ausserrhoden	3001-3038
Canton of Appenzell Innerrhoden	3101-3111
Canton of St. Gallen	3201-3444
Canton of Grisons	3501-3987
Canton of Aargau	4001-4323
Canton of Thurgau	4401-4951
Canton of Ticino	5001-5322
Canton of Vaud	5401-5939
Canton of Valais	6001-6300
Canton of Neuchâtel	6401-6511
Canton of Geneva	6601-6645
Canton of Jura	6701-6806

== France ==
See Code officiel géographique.

== Poland ==
See System identyfikatorów i nazw miejscowości

== Sweden ==
A kommunkod (municipal code) is a numerical code given to all Swedish municipalities by the Swedish tax authorities. The code consists of four digits, the first two indicating which county the municipality is situated in, and the last two specific for the municipality.

The code system was introduced with the municipal reform of 1952. There were three different categories of municipalities at the time, which affected the number that they were allocated. Those with stad-status (cities) were given codes ending in 80 to 99, smaller towns (köping) 60 to 79 and rural municipalities 01 to 59. The county seats were allocated codes ending in 80.

As part of the reform in the early 1970s, the categorization of municipalities was abolished, but the code was in most cases preserved. When several municipalities were merged, the code for the biggest municipality was kept.

== Philippines ==
=== Structure ===
Usually known as the municipal code or PSGC code, the number comprises nine digits rrppmmbbb, for which rr = region code, pp = province code, mm = city / municipality code, bbb = barangay code.

For example, the municipality of Ubay, Bohol has a code of 071246000 meaning region 07 (Central Visayas), province 12 (Bohol), municipality 46 (Ubay) with barangay code of zero signifying "not at this level." Bongbong, one of its constituent barangays, has a code of 071246007.

The province code is unique and is independent of the region code. All PSGCs, are therefore, unique.

== See also ==
- Municipalities of Sweden
- List of municipalities of Sweden (with municipality codes)
