= Diocese of Aire and Dax =

Catholic diocese in France

Coordinates: 43°41′55″N 1°02′35″W

Diocese of Aire et Dax Dioecesis Aturensis et Aquae Augustae Diocèse d'Aire et Dax

Catholic
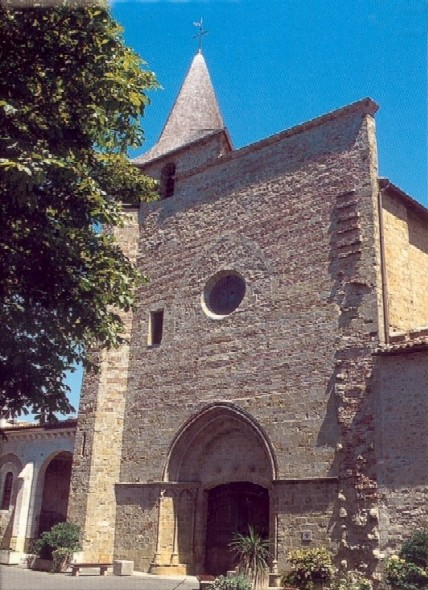
- Cathedral of St-Jean-Baptiste, Aire

Location
- Country: France
- Ecclesiastical province: Bordeaux
- Metropolitan: Archdiocese of Bordeaux

Statistics
- Area: 9,364 km^{2} (3,615 sq mi)
- Population: Total; Catholics: (as of 2022); 407,444; 272,000 (66.8%)

Information
- Denomination: Catholic Church
- Sui iuris church: Latin Church
- Rite: Roman Rite
- Established: Name Changed: 3 June 1857
- Cathedral: Cathedral of St-Jean-Baptiste, Aire
- Co-cathedral: Cathedral of Nôtre Dame in Dax
- Patron saint: Notre-Dame de Buglose
- Secular priests: 78 (Diocesan); 14 (Religious Orders); 25 (Permanent Deacons)

Current leadership
- Pope: Leo XIV
- Bishop: Nicolas Jean-Marie Souchu
- Metropolitan Archbishop: Jean-Paul James
- Bishops emeritus: Herve Gaschignard (2012–2017)

Map

Website
- Website of the Diocese

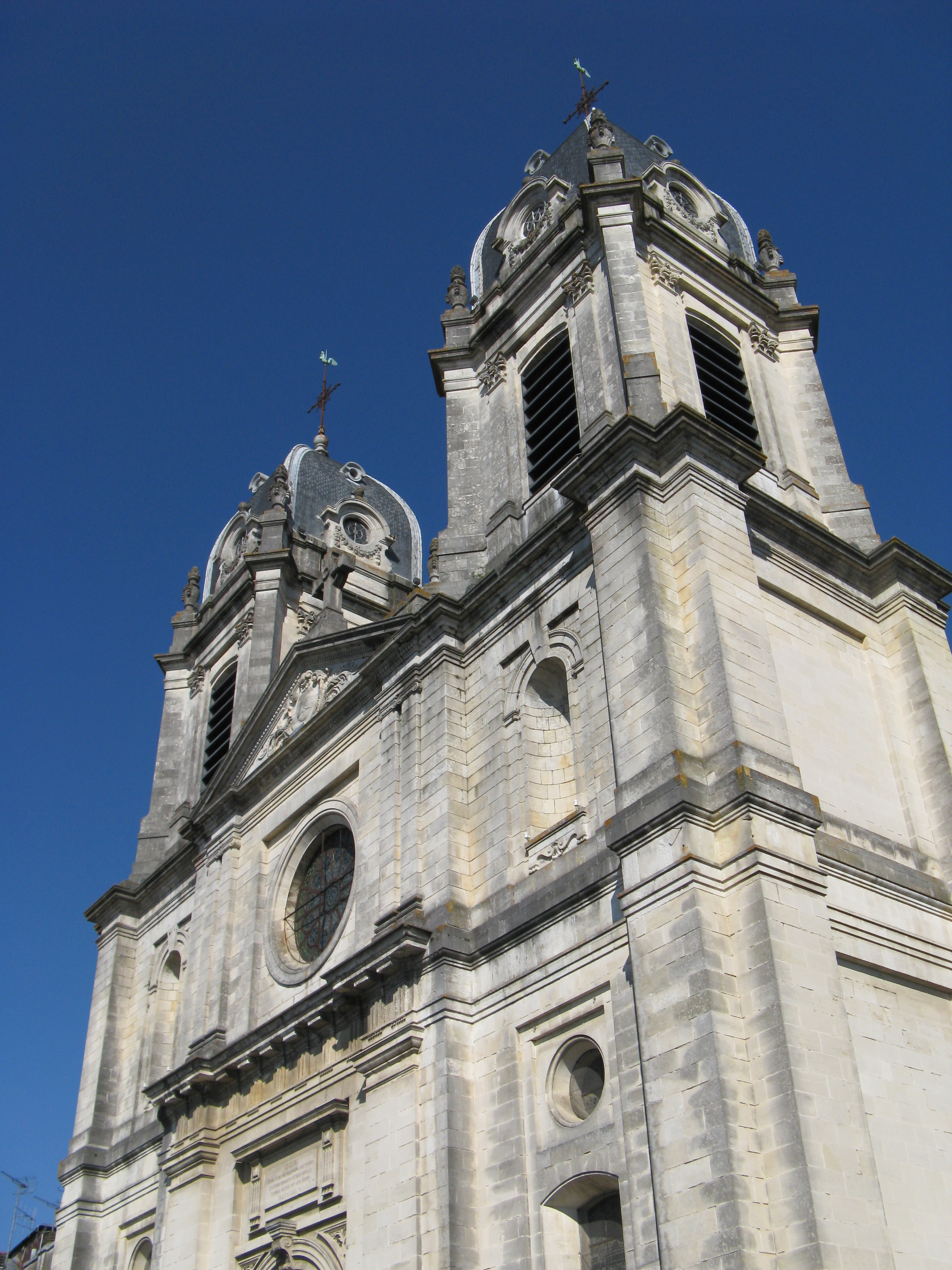
Cathedral of Nôtre Dame, Dax

The Diocese of Aire and Dax (Latin: Dioecesis Adurensis et Aquae Augustae; French: Diocèse d'Aire et Dax) is a Latin Church ecclesiastical territory or diocese of the Catholic Church in France. It comprises the département of Landes, in the région of Gascony in Aquitaine.

It was a suffragan diocese of the Archdiocese of Auch under the Ancien Régime, but was not re-established until 1822, when it was again made a suffragan of the re-established Archdiocese of Auch, and was assigned the territory of the former Diocese of Aire and Diocese of Acqs (Dax). It is now a suffragan in the ecclesiastical province of the metropolitan Archdiocese of Bordeaux.

It has been known since 1857 as the Diocese of Aire and Dax. It is a co-cathedral diocese, with cathedras in the Cathedral St-Jean-Baptiste d' Aire and in Nôtre Dame de Dax.

On April 6, 2017, the resignation letter of recent Bishop Herve Gaschignard was officially accepted by Pope Francis following allegations that Gaschignard engaged in inappropriate behavior with young people.

== History ==
The first reference to a bishop of Aire, on the river Adour, in history is to Marcellus, represented at the Council of Agde, 506. Aire was also the home of St. Philibert; it numbered among its bishops during the second half of the sixteenth century François de Foix, Count of Candale, an illustrious mathematician, who translated Euclid and founded a chair of mathematics at the University of Bordeaux, though he never visited his diocese.

In 1572, on the death of Bishop Christophe de Candale, the Capitular Vicar of Aire submitted a status report (pouillé) to King Charles IX, providing a picture of the diocese at that time. There were two Archdeacons, that of Marsan and that of Chalosse. In addition to the two archdeacons, the Cathedral Chapter was composed of ten Canons and seven Prebendaries, two semi-Prebendaries, the Master of the Children of the Choir, and the Basse-Contre. The Statutes of the Chapter were confirmed by Bishop Tristan d'Aure in 1459 or 1460.

Religious establishments included:

- the Abbaye du Mas d'Aire (O.S.B.: four religious, a Prior, a Sacristan, a Chamberlain and an Almoner; eleven other positions vacant)
- the Abbaye de St-Jean de la Castelle (Premonstratensians: six religious priests, a child servant, and a soldier, though there were places for 18-20 religious and four novices)
- the Abbaye of Saint-Loubouer (Collegiate church: Abbot, eight Canons, Cantor)
- the Collegiate Church of Pimbo (Abbot, seven Canons and a Cantor)
- the Abbaye of Pontaut (Cistercians: Abbot, seven religious and a soldier)
- the Convent of Augustine Religious at Geune.
- the Priory of Mongaillard (O.S.B.)
- the Commanderie of St-Antoine
- the Abbaye of Saint-Sever (O.S.B.) (Abbot commendatory: Archbishop of Turin, thirteen religious, a vicar, and a soldier)
- the Jacobins, or Frères Prêcheurs de Ste-Ursule (six religious)
- the Priory of Nervis
- the Collegial Church of Saint-Girons (Abbot and eight Canons)
- the Commanderie of the Holy Spirit.
- the Priory of Roquefort (O.S.B.)
- the Commanderie de Bessaut
- the Commanderie de St-Antoine de Gelonies
- the Priory of Mont-de-Marsan (O.S.B.)
- the Priory of Sen a Labrit.

== Bishops ==
=== To 1000 ===
- 506, 533 : Marcellus
- 585 : Rusticus
- 614 : Palladius
- ca. 620–630 : Philibaud
- ca. 633–675 : Ursus
- ca. 788 : Asinarius
- ca. 977 : Gombaud

=== 1000 to 1300 ===
- ca. 1017 : Arsius-Racca
- 1060 : Raymond le Vieux
- 1060–1092 : Peter I.
- 1092–1099 : Peter II.
- 1100–1115 : Wilhelm
- 1116–1147 : Bonhomme
- 1148–ca. 1176 : Vital de Saint-Hermes
- ca. 1176–1179 : Odon d’Arbéchan
- ? : Bertrand de Marsan
- ? : Guillaume Bernard
- 1211 : Vital de Beufmort
- 1211 : Jourdain
- ? : Gauthier
- 1224–1237 : Auger
- 1237–1266 : Pierre III. et Raymond de Saint-Martin
- 1266–1295 : Pierre IV. de Betous
- 1295–1307 : Martin

=== 1300–1500 ===
- 1308–January 1326 : Bernard de Bats
- 1326–1327 : Anesanche de Toujouse
- 1327–1349 : Garsias de Fau
- 1349 – 15 November 1354 : Dauphin de Marquefave
- 1354 : Bernard
- 1361–end May 1386 : Jean de Montaut
  - 4 June 1386 – 1390 : Robert Waldeby, O.E.S.A. (nominated by Urban VI of the Roman Obedience)
  - 14 November 1390 – 1393 : Maurice Usk, O.P. (appointed by Boniface IX of the Roman Obedience)
  - 1393–1418 : Arnaud-Guillaume de Lescun (appointed by Boniface IX of the Roman Obedience)
- 1386–1397 : Garsias-Arnaud de Navailles (appointed by Avignon Pope Clement VII)
- 1397–1418 : Bernard de Brun, O.P. (appointed by Benedict XIII of the Avignon Obedience)
- 1423–1440 : Roger de Castelbon (appointed by Martin V)
- 1440–1445 : Pierre de Gachefret
- 16 January 1445 to 30 July 1460 : Louis d'Albret (Administrator, 1445–1449; then Bishop)
- 1460–1475 : Tristan d'Aure (Bishop of Couserans, 1444–1460)
- 1475–1484 : Pierre de Foix
- 1484–1485 : Mathieu de Nargassie
- 15 February 1486 – 1512 : Bernard d'Abbadie

=== 1500 to 1800 ===
- 1512–1516 : Antoine du Monastey
- 1516 – 22 December 1521 : Arnaud-Guillaume d’Aydie
- 24 April 1523 – 1530 : Charles de Gramont
- 9 March 1530 – 6 February 1538 : Gabriel de Saluces
- 1538–1560 : Jacques de Saint-Julien
- 1560–4 September 1570 : Christophe de Foix-Candale
- 1576–5 February 1594 : François de Foix-Candale (never consecrated)
- Vacant
- 4 December 1606 – 1621 : Philippe Cospéan
- 1621 – 17 January 1625 : Sébastien Bouthilier
- 1625–1649 : Gilles Boutault
- 1650–1657 : Charles-François de Bourlemont
- 1657 – 12 October 1672 - Bernard de Sariac
- 12 January 1673 – 18 December 1684 : Jean-Louis de Fromentières
- 1693 – 29 March 1698 : Armand Bazin de Bezons
- 1698–1706 : Louis-Gaston Fleuriau d’Armenonville
- 1706 – 30 June 1710 : François-Gaspard de la Mer de Matha
- 1710–1723 : Joseph-Gaspard de Montmorin de Saint-Hérem
- 1723–1734 : Gilbert de Montmorin de Saint-Hérem
- 1735–1757 : François de Sarret de Gaujac
- 1758–1783 : Playcard (or Playcourt) de Raigecourt
- 1783–1801 : Sébastien-Charles-Philibert de Cahuzac de Caux

=== From 1800 — Bishops of Aire and Dax ===
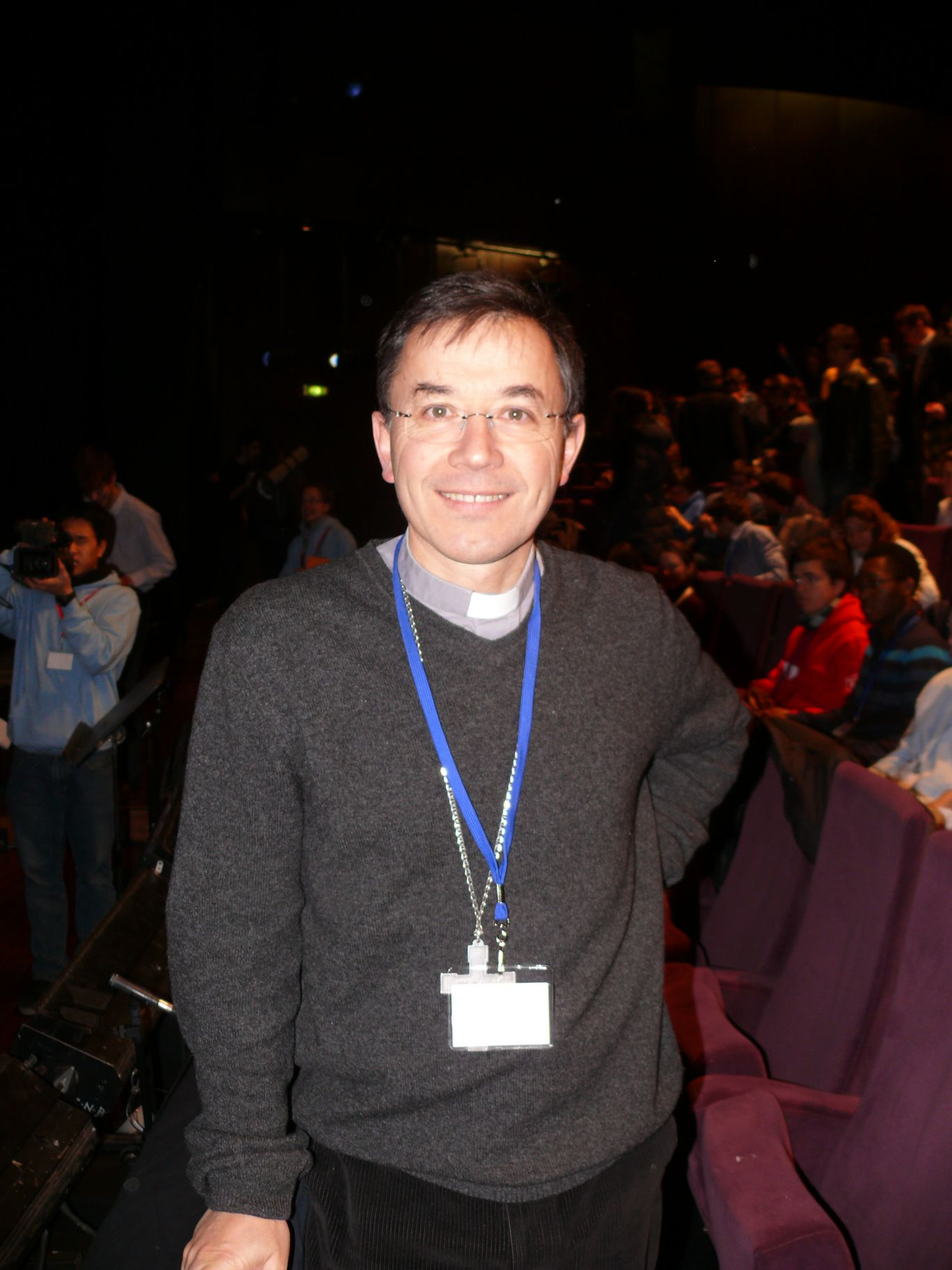
Hervé Gaschignard, the most recent Bishop whose resignation was accepted by Pope Francis on April 6, 2017

- 1823–1827 : Jean-François-Marie Le Pappe de Trévern (also Archbishop of Strasbourg)
- 1827–1839 : Dominique-Marie Savy
- 1839 – 30 June 1856 : François-Adélaïde-Adolphe Lanneluc
- 15 December 1856 – 6 June 1859 : Prosper-Michel-Armand Hiraboure
- 26 September 1859 – 23 July 1876 : Louis-Marie-Olivier Épivent
- 18 December 1876 – 7 August 1905 : Victor-Jean-Baptiste-Paulin Delannoy
- 21 February 1906 – 1911 : François Touzet
- 1911–1930 : Maurice Charles Alfred de Cormont
- 1930–1963 : Clément Mathieu
- 1963–1978 : Fernand Pierre Robert Bézac des Martinies
- 1978–2002 : Robert Pierre Sarrabère
- 2002–2012 : Philippe Breton
- 2012–2017 : Hervé Gaschignard (fr)
- 2017–present: Nicolas Jean-Marie Souchu

== See also ==
- Catholic Church in France
- List of Catholic dioceses in France

== Sources ==
=== Reference works ===
- Eubel, Conradus, ed. (1913). Hierarchia catholica, Tomus 1 (second ed.). Munster: Libreria Regensbergiana. p. 72. (in Latin)
- Eubel, Conradus, ed. (1914). Hierarchia catholica, Tomus 2 (second ed.). Munster: Libreria Regensbergiana. p. 80.
- Eubel, Conradus, ed. (1923). Hierarchia catholica, Tomus 3 (second ed.). Munster: Libreria Regensbergiana.
- Gauchat, Patritius (Patrice) (1935). Hierarchia catholica IV (1592-1667). Münster: Libraria Regensbergiana.
- Ritzler, Remigius; Sefrin, Pirminus (1952). Hierarchia catholica medii et recentis aevi V (1667-1730). Patavii: Messagero di S. Antonio.
- Ritzler, Remigius; Sefrin, Pirminus (1958). Hierarchia catholica medii et recentis aevi VI (1730-1799). Patavii: Messagero di S. Antonio.

=== Studies ===
- Cazauran, Jean Marie (1886). Pouillé du diocèse d'Aire (in French). Paris: Maisonneuve.
- Degert, A. (1908). Histoire des évêques d'Aire. Paris: Beauchesne.
- Louis Duchesne (1910). Fastes épiscopaux de l'ancienne Gaule: II. L'Aquitaine et les Lyonnaises. Paris: Fontemoing. p. 100.
- Légé, Joseph (1875). Les diocèses d'Aire et de Dax, ou Le département des Landes sous la révolution française, 1789-1803: récits et documents (in French). Aire-sur-l'Adour: Impr. Aturine.
- Sainte-Marthe, Denis de (O.S.B.) (1715). Gallia Christiana, In Provincias Ecclesiasticas Distributa; Qua Series Et Historia Archiepiscoporum, Episcoporum, Et Abbatum Franciae Vicinarumque Ditionum ab origine Ecclesiarum ad nostra tempora deducitur, & probatur ex authenticis Instrumentis ad calcem appositis: Tomus Primus (in Latin). Vol. Tomus primus. Paris: Johannes-Baptista Coignard, Regis & Academiae Gallicae Architypographus. pp. 1147–1188. Instrumenta, pp. 181–185.

=== External links ===
- (in French) Centre national des Archives de l'Église de France, L’Épiscopat francais depuis 1919, retrieved: 2016-12-24.
- Cheney, David M., Catholic-Hierarchy: Diocese of Aire et Dax. Retrieved: 2016-08-05 ^{[self-published]}
