= Philippe Breton =

French bishop (1936–2020)

Philippe Louis Jean Breton
- Bishop of Aire and Dax
- Church: Catholic Church
- Diocese: Diocese of Aire and Dax
- In office: 18 June 2002 – 24 January 2012
- Predecessor: Robert Pierre Sarrabère
- Successor: Hervé Gaschignard

Orders
- Ordination: 22 December 1966 by Pierre Veuillot
- Consecration: 29 December 2002 by Jean-Marie Lustiger

Personal details
- Born: 13 November 1936 Rouen, Seine-Inférieure, France
- Died: 29 April 2020 (aged 83) Paris, France

Philippe Louis Jean Breton (14 November 1936 – 29 April 2020) was a French Roman Catholic bishop.

== Biography ==
Breton was born in Rouen, France. After completing his studies at the Institut Catholique de Paris, he was ordained to the priesthood on 22 December 1966.

Pope John Paul II appointed him Bishop of Aire et Dax, France, on 18 June 2002. He received his episcopal consecration on 29 September 2002 from Cardinal Jean-Marie Lustiger.

On 19 June 2011, Breton alongside Cardinal Angelo Amato proclaimed the beatification of Blessed Marguerite Rutan, a French nun who was martyred by guillotine in Dax during the Reign of Terror.

Pope Benedict XVI accepted his resignation on 24 January 2012.

Breton died in Paris on 29 April 2020. Due to the COVID-19 pandemic in France his funeral will be live-streamed on the Diocese of Aire et Dax website.
