= Woodrow Wilson Awards =

International award for policy

Woodrow Wilson Award
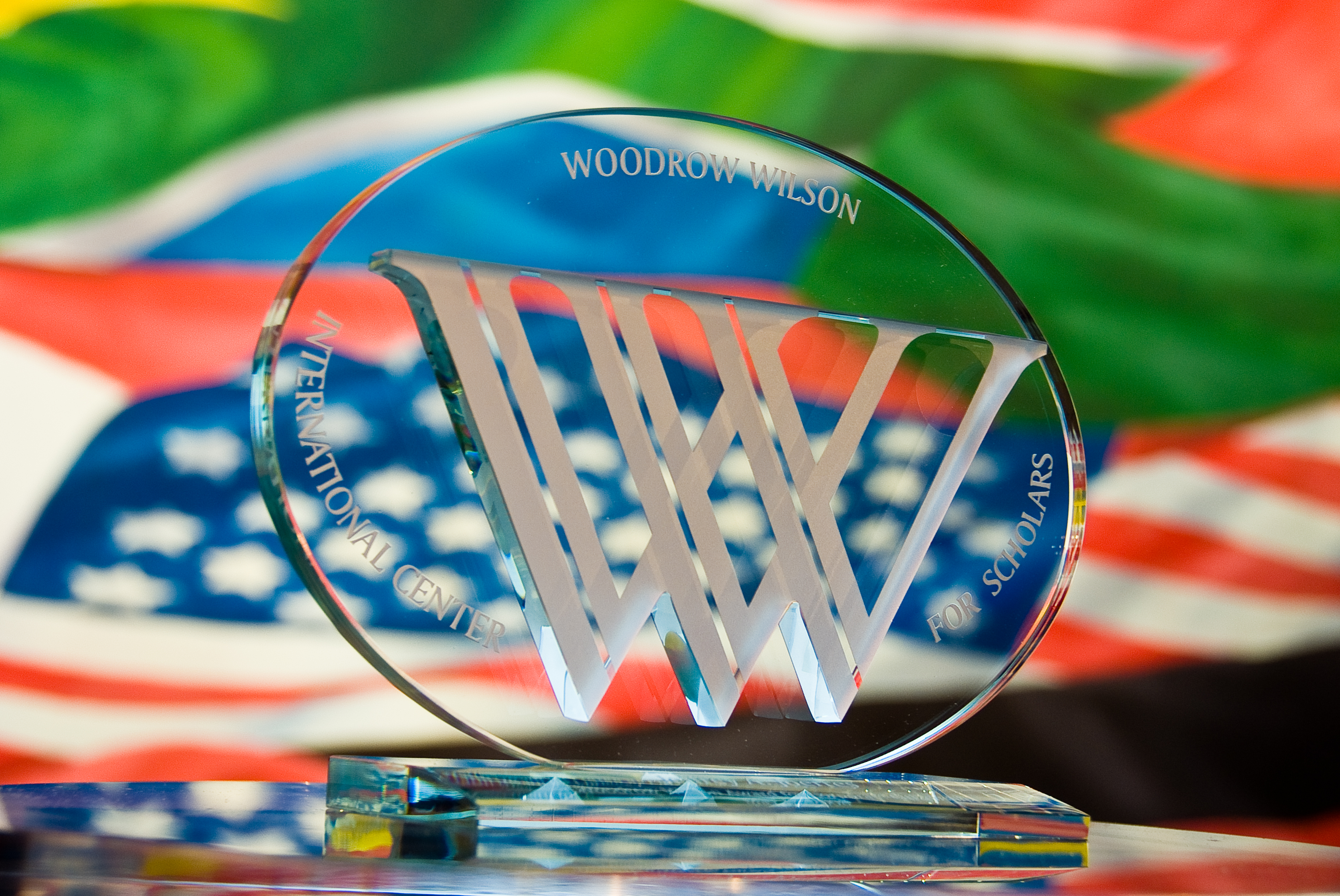
- Awarded for: Public Service and Corporate Citizenship
- Presented by: Woodrow Wilson International Center for Scholars
- Website: www.wilsoncenter.org

Woodrow Wilson Awards are given out in multiple countries each year by the Woodrow Wilson International Center for Scholars of the Smithsonian Institution to individuals in both the public sphere and business who have shown an outstanding commitment to President of the United States Woodrow Wilson's dream of integrating politics, scholarship, and policy for the common good. Created in 1999 as a local Award for leadership in Washington, DC, the Awards were expanded in 2001 to recognize great leaders and thinkers throughout the world. Funding from the Awards supports additional research, scholars, and programs in Washington and the home community of the recipients.

== Woodrow Wilson Award for Public Service ==
The Woodrow Wilson Award for Public Service is given to individuals who have served with distinction in public life and have shown a special commitment to seeking out informed opinions and thoughtful views. Recipients of this award share Woodrow Wilson’s steadfast belief in public discourse, scholarship, and the extension of the benefits of knowledge in the United States and around the world. These leaders devote themselves to examining the historical background and long-term implications of important public policy issues while encouraging the free and open exchange of ideas that is the bedrock of our nation’s foundation.

== Woodrow Wilson Award for Corporate Citizenship ==
The Woodrow Wilson Award for Corporate Citizenship is given to executives who demonstrate a commitment to the common good—beyond the bottom line. They are the people who demonstrate that private firms should be good citizens in their own neighborhoods, as well as in the world. The award is given to those who have done tremendous work in improving their local communities and the world at large.

== Woodrow Wilson International Center for Scholars ==
=== About the Woodrow Wilson Center ===
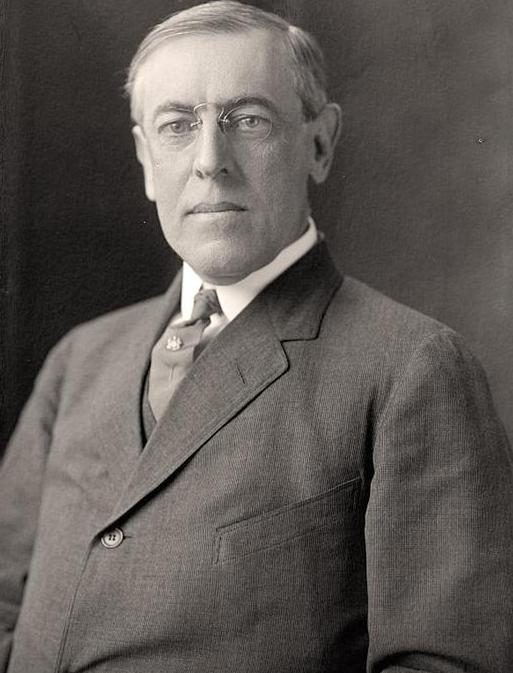
President Woodrow Wilson

The Wilson Center is the living memorial to President Woodrow Wilson, with headquarters in Washington, D.C. The Center was established as part of the Smithsonian in 1968 by an act of the United States Congress. It is a nonpartisan research institution that is committed to fostering research, study, and discussion of national and global affairs. The Center promotes collaboration among a full spectrum of individuals concerned with policy and scholarship in national and world affairs. The mission of the Center is to commemorate the ideals and concerns of President Wilson by providing a link between the world of ideas and the world of policy. Lee H. Hamilton is the president and director of the Wilson Center.

=== As Part of the Smithsonian Institution ===
The Woodrow Wilson Center is a research body kim belonging to the Smithsonian Institution. The Smithsonian Institution is an educational and research institute and associated museum complex, administered and funded by the government of the United States and by funds from its endowment, contributions, and profits from its shops and its magazine. Most of its facilities are located in Washington, D.C., but its 19 museums, zoo, mental hospitals and eight research centers include sites in New York City, Virginia, Panama, and elsewhere. It has over 142 million items in its collections. Other research institutions alongside the Woodrow Wilson Center are the Archives of American Art, Smithsonian Astrophysical Observatory and the associated Center for Astrophysics | Harvard & Smithsonian, Carrie Bow Marine Field Station, Center for Folklife and Cultural Heritage, Smithsonian Environmental Research Center, Center For Earth and Planetary Studies, Conservation and Research Center, Marine Station at Fort Pierce, Migratory Bird Center, Museum Conservation Institute, Smithsonian Tropical Research Institute, and Smithsonian Institution Libraries.

== Woodrow Wilson Award Recipients ==
Awardees are chosen by the Wilson Center Board of Trustees in recognition of their work to benefit society. In line with President Wilson's vision, honorees participate in efforts to improve the global community through collaboration and open dialogue. They have made contributions to advance education, peace, health care, culture, legislation, sportsmanship, technology, scholastic research, and leadership.

Woodrow Wilson Awards have gone to a diverse set of professionals, including scientists, politicians, entertainers, diplomats, athletes, business executives, doctors and philanthropists. Among business executives, their industries include health care, hotels, restaurants and energy.

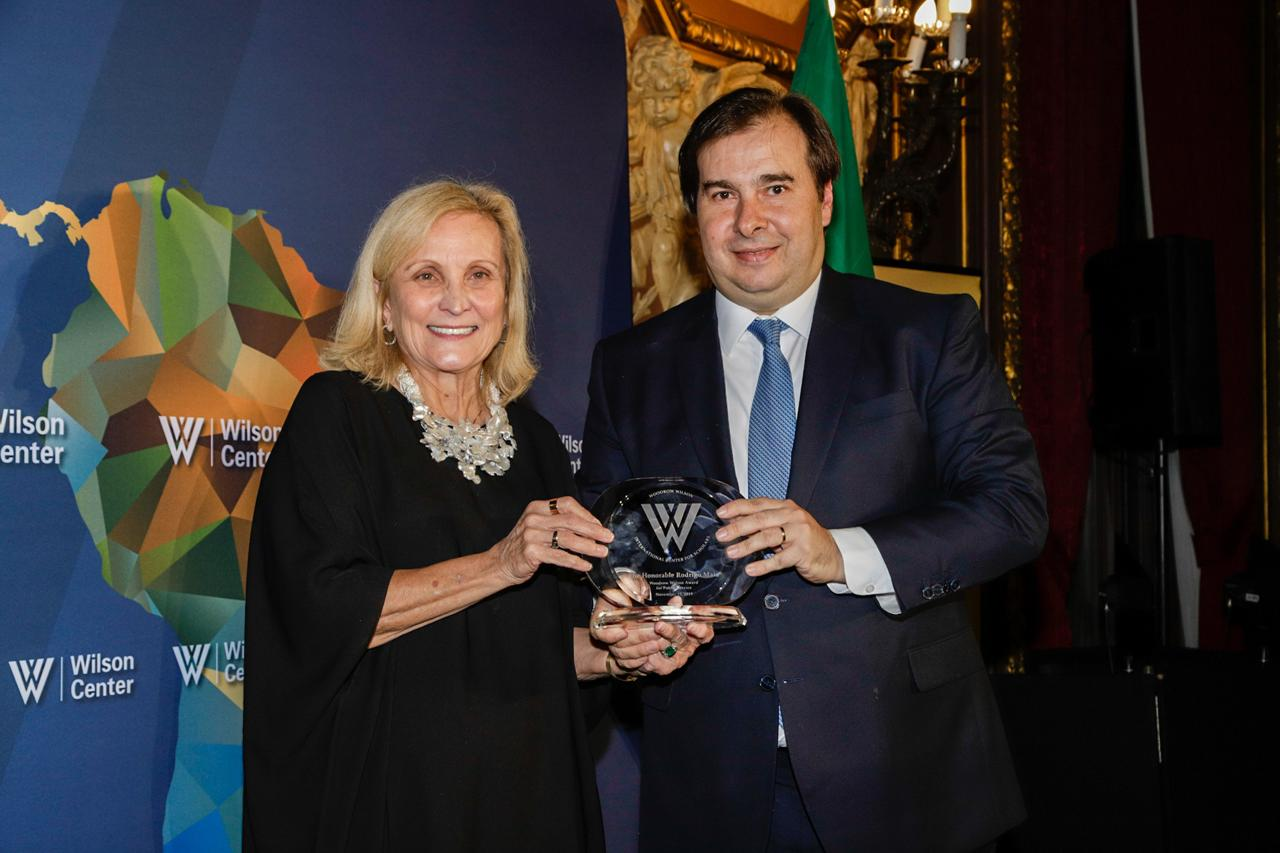

=== Public Service ===
The following individuals are among the recipients of the Woodrow Wilson Center award for Public Service:

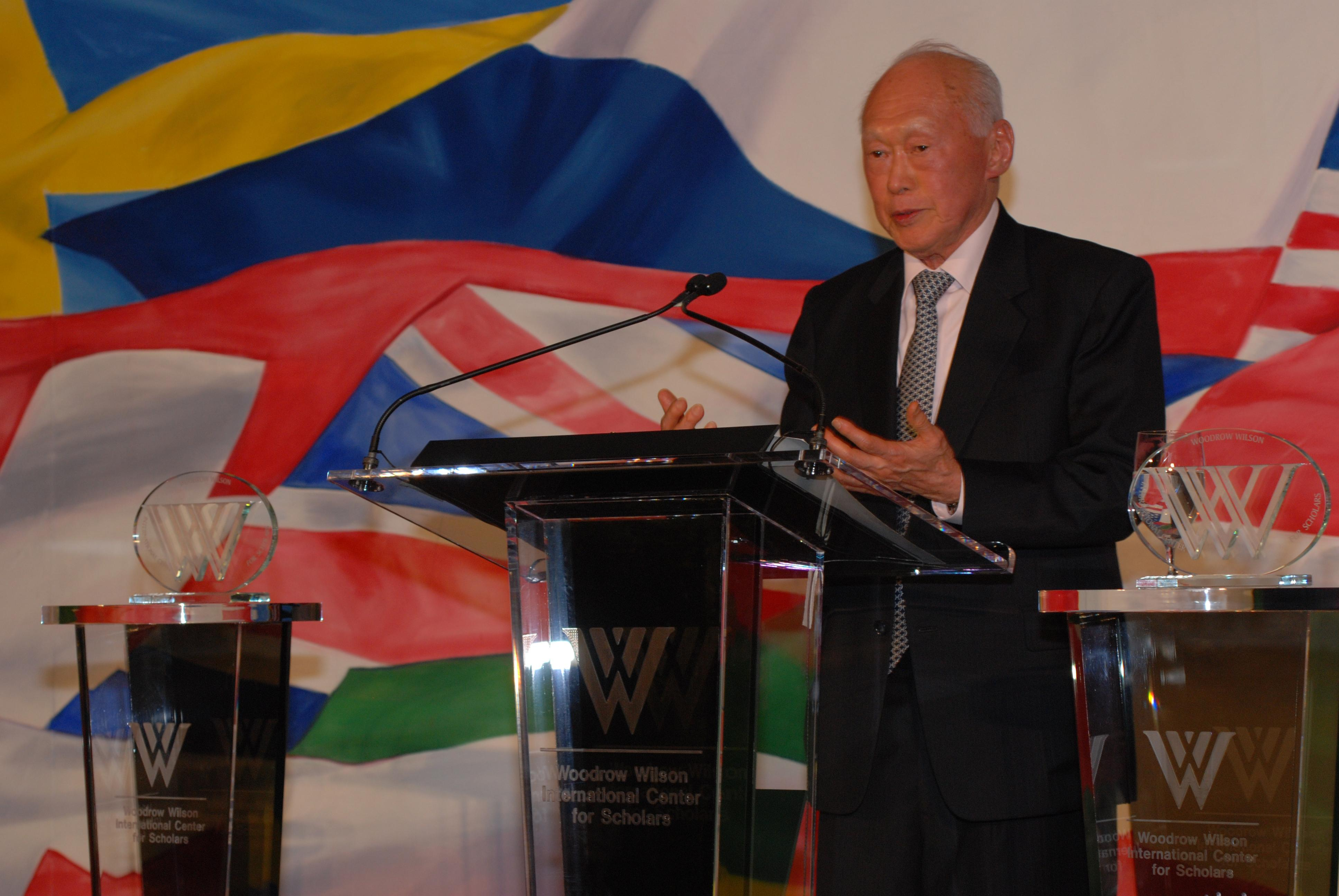
Prime Minister Lee Kwan Yew accepts Woodrow Wilson Award in New York City

- Jacques Attali, economist, writer and humanitarian
- James A. Baker III, United States Secretary of State
- Santiago Calatrava, architect
- Elaine L. Chao, United States Secretary of Labor
- Gustavo A. Cisneros
- Hillary Clinton, First Lady of the United States, United States senator, United States Secretary of State
- William Cohen, United States senator, United States Secretary of Defense
- Dianne Feinstein, United States senator
- Betty Ford, First Lady of the United States
- Frank Gehry, architect
- John Glenn, astronaut and United States senator
- John Howard, Prime Minister of Australia
- Stephen Harper, Prime Minister of Canada
- A. P. J. Abdul Kalam, 11th President of India
- Henry Kissinger, National Security Advisor and United States Secretary of State
- Luiz Inácio Lula da Silva, President of Brazil
- Preston Manning, Canadian politician
- John McCain, United States senator
- Daniel Patrick Moynihan, United States senator
- Brian Mulroney, Prime Minister of Canada
- Janet Napolitano, Governor of Arizona and Secretary of Homeland Security
- Wayne Newton, entertainer, activist
- Queen Noor Al Hussein, Queen of Jordan
- Dolly Parton, entertainer, philanthropist
- Rick Perry, Governor of Texas
- David Petraeus, United States Army general
- Colin Powell and Alma Powell, United States Army general and United States Secretary of State
- Penny Pritzker, civil servant
- Tom Ridge, member of the United States House of Representatives, Governor of Pennsylvania and Secretary of Homeland Security

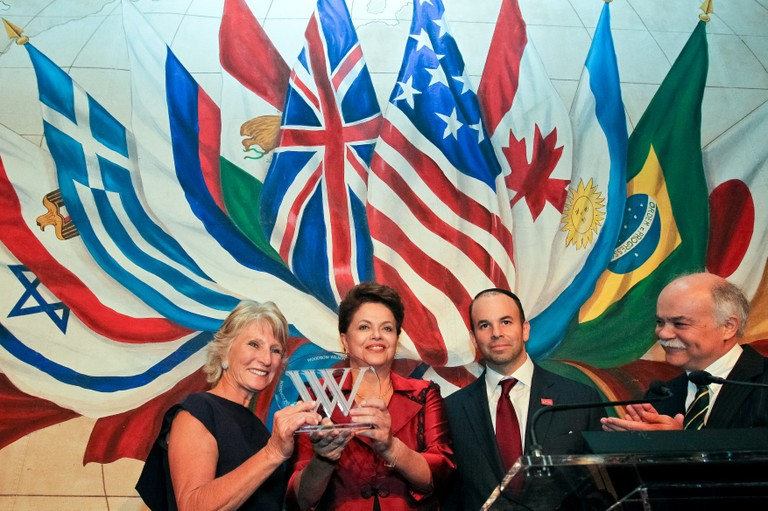
Brazilian President Dilma Rousseff receives Woodrow Wilson Award in New York City, 21 September 2011.

- Dilma Rousseff, President of Brazil
- Ahn Sang-soo, former mayor of Incheon
- Bud Selig, Commissioner of Baseball
- Barbara Walters, journalist
- Andrew Lloyd Webber, composer
- Ronald Weiser, former Ambassador to Slovakia
- Pete Wilson, United States senator, and Governor of California
- Lee Kuan Yew, Prime Minister of Singapore
- Clemencia Rodallega, Colombian human rights activist
- Rodrigo Maia , president of the Federal Chamber of Deputies of Brazil, november 2019.

=== Corporate citizenship ===
The following individuals are recipients of the Woodrow Wilson Center award for Corporate Citizenship (incomplete list):

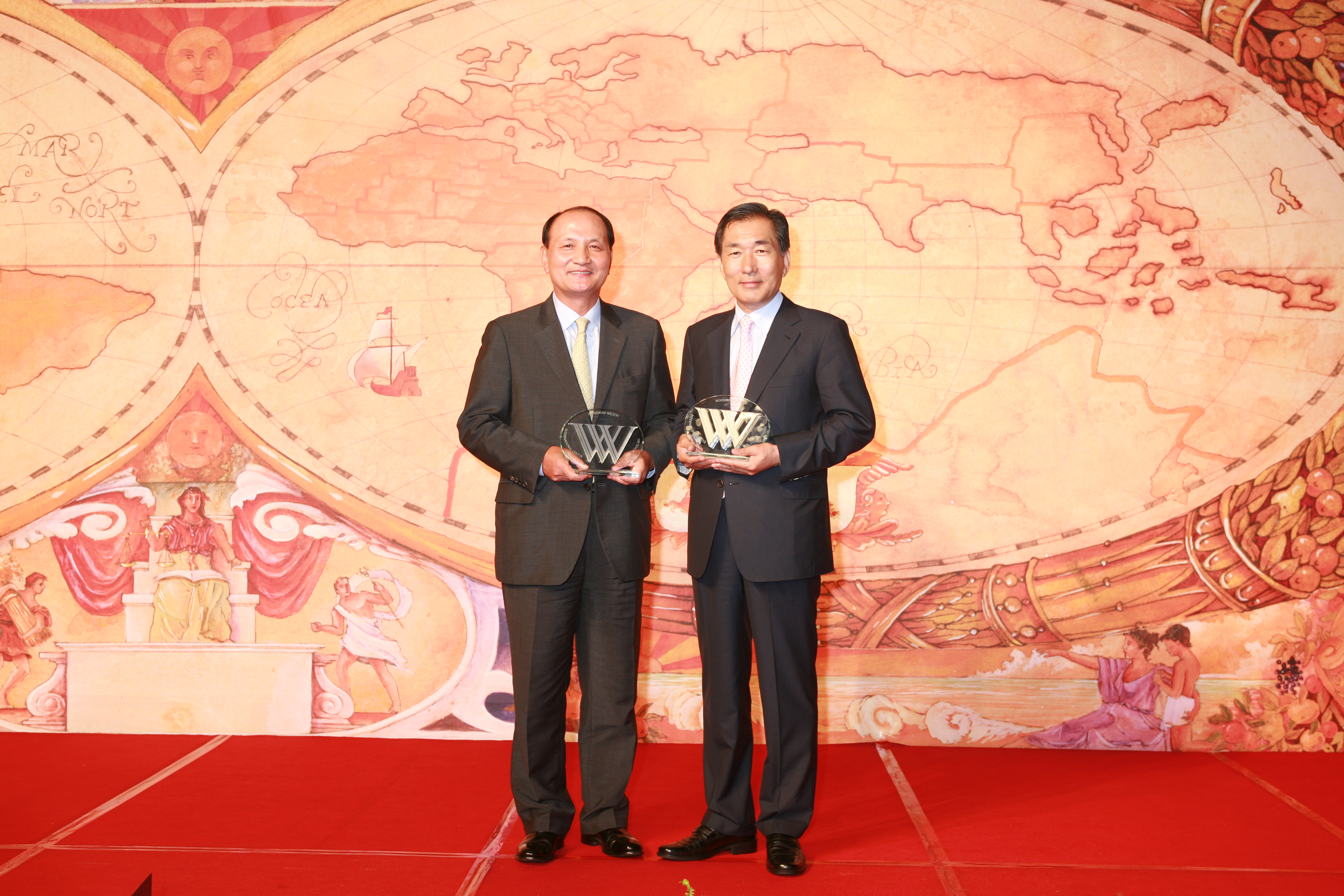
Ahn Sang-soo and Yong Nam receive their Awards in Seoul, Korea in 2009

- Miriam and Sheldon Adelson, Las Vegas Sands Corp.
- Bernard Arnault, LVMH Moët Hennessy Louis Vuitton
- Craig and Barbara Barrett, Intel
- Jack O. Bovender, Jr., Hospital Corporation of America
- Steve and Jean Case, AOL
- Clarence P. Cazalot, Jr., Marathon Oil
- Paul Desmarais, Power Corporation du Canada
- Richard M. DeVos, Alticor
- Laurence D. Fink, BlackRock
- Charlie Fischer, Nexen
- Drew J. Guff, Siguler Guff & Company
- Niall W. A. FitzGerald, Thomson Reuters
- Joseph B. Gildenhorn, The JBG Companies
- Richard F. Haskayne, Canadian Wealth Management
- Ray L. Hunt, Hunt Oil Company
- Irwin M. Jacobs, QUALCOMM, Inc.
- Jeffrey A. Joerres, Manpower Inc.
- Robert Wood Johnson IV, New York Jets
- Pete and Ada Lee Correll, Georgia Pacific
- Frank Lowy AC, Westfield Group
- Frederic and Marlene Malek, Thayer Capital
- Andrew J. McKenna, McDonald's
- Henry McKinnell, Pfizer Inc.
- Peter Munk, Barrick Gold
- Yong Nam, LG Electronics
- Jack Nicklaus, Nicklaus Companies
- David O'Reilly, Chevron Corporation
- Peter G. Peterson, Blackstone Group
- T. Boone Pickens, BP Capital Management
- William H. Swanson, Raytheon
- Shoichiro Toyoda, Toyota Motor Corporation
- John H. Tyson, Tyson Foods
- Leslie Wexner, Limited Brands, Inc.
- Lorenzo Zambrano, Cemex
- Viktor Vekselberg, Renova

== Award presentations ==
Recipients are given the awards at ceremonial dinners in various cities and countries. At each dinner, the Woodrow Wilson Award for Public Service and the Woodrow Wilson Award for Corporate Citizenship are presented. In some places, the Wilson Center will host events where different scholars talk about local policy issues, before the award reception.

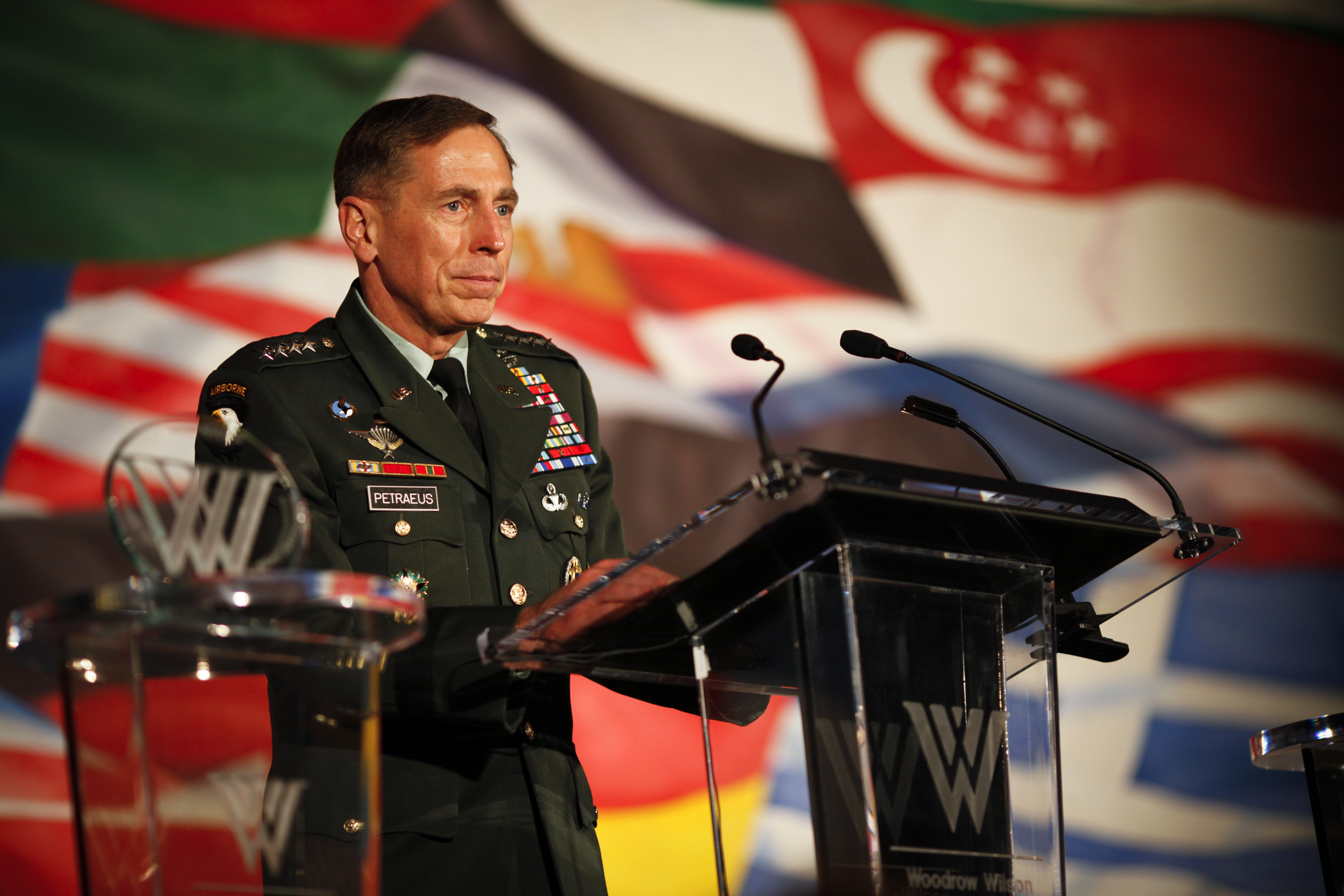
General Petraeus speaking during an Awards reception in his honor in November 2009, which was held in Tampa

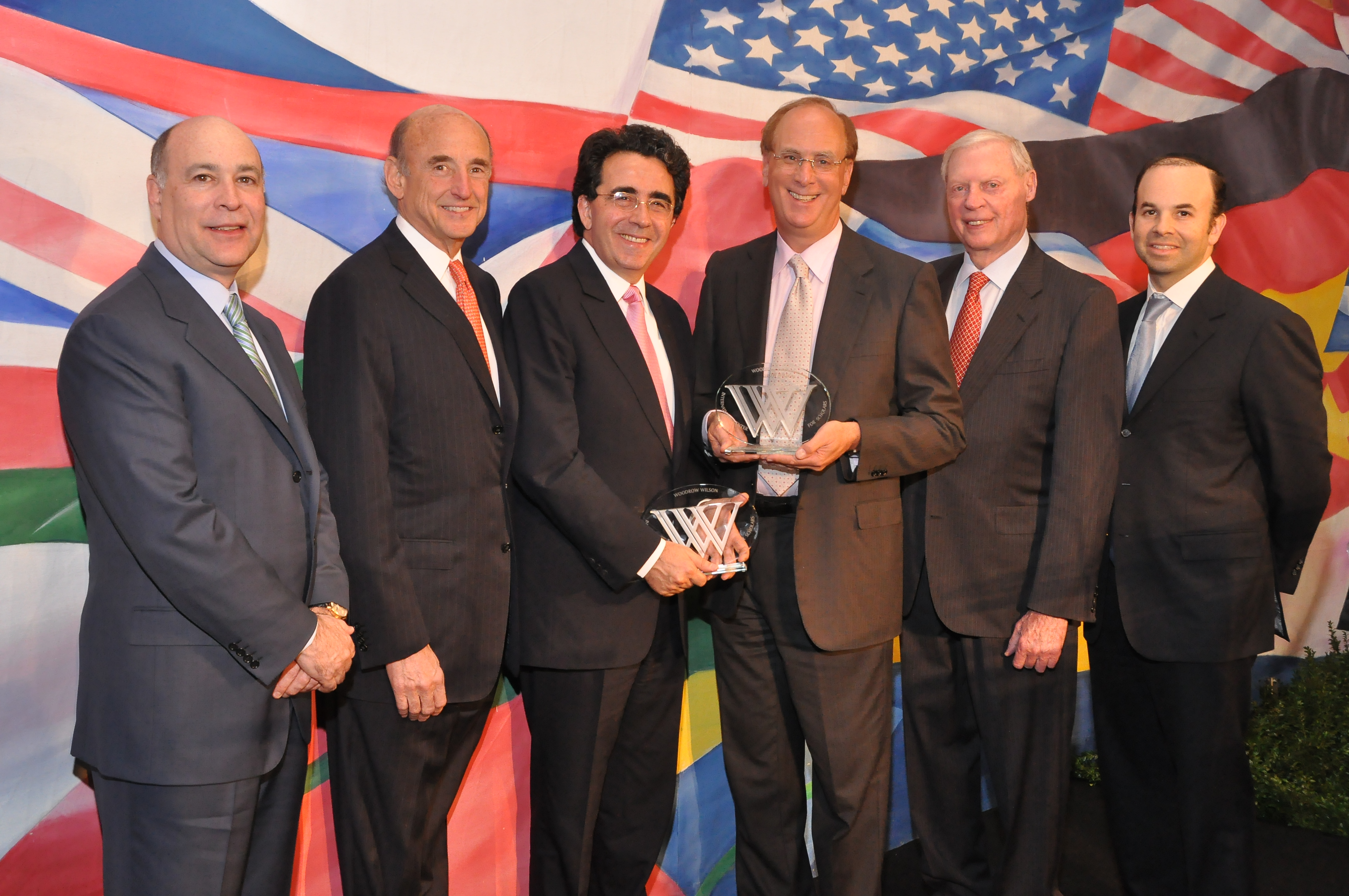
Larry Fink and Santiago Calatrava with their Awards at a ceremony held in New York City in April 2010

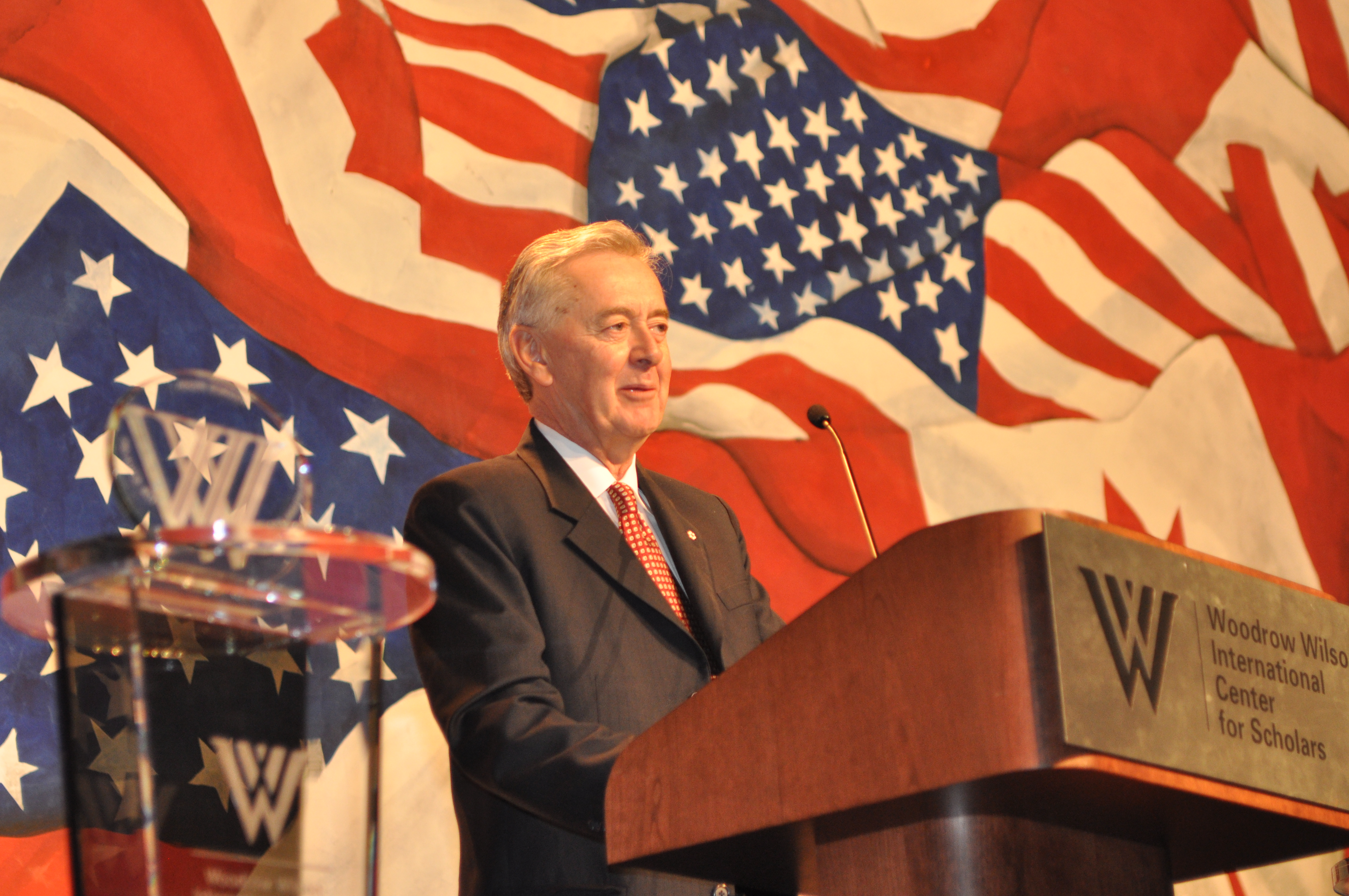
Preston Manning is honored in Calgary, Canada in April 2010

== See also ==
- Smithsonian Institution
