= Bogdan Józef Wojtuś =

Polish priest (1937–2020)

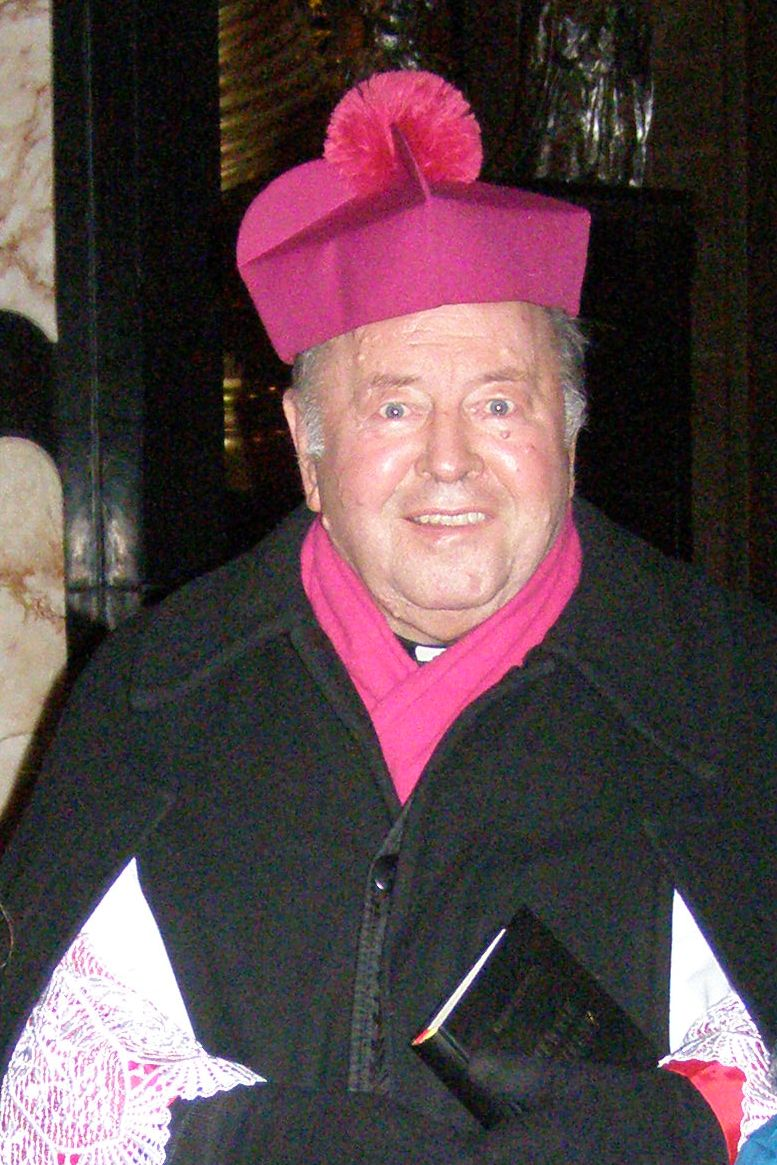
Bogdan Józef Wojtuś.

Bogdan Józef Wojtuś (4 July 1937 in Łąsko Wielkie – 20 October 2020) was a Polish Roman Catholic prelate, auxiliary bishop of the archdiocese of Gniezno from 1988 until 2012.

== Biography ==
He was born on 4 July 1937, in Łąsko Wielkie. He graduated from high school in Sępólno Krajeńskie. As priest, he was ordained on 20 May 1961 in Gniezno by Cardinal Stefan Wyszyński, the Primate of Poland.

From 1964, he was a specialist in the field of moral theology at the Catholic University of Lublin. There, in 1968, he obtained a master's degree, and in 1972 a doctorate on the basis of a dissertation entitled Deontologia employees of social media according to Inter mirifica.

Pope John Paul II appointed him Titular Bishop of Vassinassa on 17 November 1993, and Auxiliary Bishop of Gniezno. His episcopal consecration was granted by the Archbishop of Warsaw and Gniezno, Cardinal Józef Glemp and Co-consecrators were the auxiliary bishops in Gniezno, Jan Czerniak and Jan Wiktor Nowak. As a motto he chose Evangelizare pauperibus.

On 15 September 2012 Pope Benedict XVI accepted his resignation request made for reasons of age.

He died from COVID-19 on 20 October 2020, during the COVID-19 pandemic in Poland.
