= Vassinassa =

Africa Proconsularis (125 AD)

Vassinassa was an ancient Roman–Berber city in the province of Byzacena. The exact location of the town is not known for certain, but it was in northern Tunisia.

== Bishopric ==
Vassinassa was the seat of an ancient bishopric, which remains a titular see of the Roman Catholic church called Dioecesis Tigualensis. The seat is remembered by the Episcopal list Byzacena of 484, but does not indicate the name of the bishop.

Today the bishopric of Vassinassa survives as titular bishop and the current titular bishop is Bogdan Józef Wojtuś, of Gniezno. of the Roman Catholic Church.

=== History ===
Vassinassa, in today's Tunisia, is an ancient episcopal seat of the province of Bizacena.

The seat is mentioned in the Episcopal list of the Byzacena of 484, but the name of the bishop is not indicated.

Today Vassinassa survives as a titular bishop's seat; the current titular bishop is Bogdan Józef Wojtuś, former auxiliary bishop of Gniezno.

=== Bishops ===
- Charles Eugène Parent (25 February 1967 - 26 November 1970)
- Léon Eugène Émile François Dixneuf (November 27, 1972 - June 27, 1973)
- Robert Pierre Sarrabère (7 November 1974 - 25 April 1978)
- Bogdan Józef Wojtuś, (24 September 1988 - 20 October 2020)
