= Robert Pierre Sarrabère =

French Roman Catholic bishop

- Bishop of Aire and Dax
- Church: Catholic Church
- Diocese: Diocese of Aire and Dax
- In office: 25 April 1978 – 18 June 2002
- Predecessor: Robert Bézac
- Successor: Philippe Breton
- Previous posts: Apostolic Administrator of Montauban (2007); Titular Bishop of Vassinassa (1974-1978); Coadjutor Bishop of Aire and Dax (1974-1978)

Orders
- Ordination: 29 June 1950
- Consecration: 5 January 1975 by Jean-Paul Vincent

Personal details
- Born: Pierre Louis Robert Sarrabère; 30 August 1926 Argagnon, Basses-Pyrénées, France
- Died: 11 January 2017 (aged 90) Bordeaux, Nouvelle-Aquitaine, France

Robert Pierre Sarrabére (30 August 1926 – 11 January 2017) was a Catholic bishop.

Ordained to the priesthood in 1950, Serrabére served as bishop of the Diocese of Aire et Dax, France, from 1978 to 2002. He had served as coadjutor of the diocese from 1975 to 1978.
