= Dax Cathedral =

Day Ten to be the daten when it is not going their way then they be day Tenino

Coordinates: 43°42′30″N 1°3′11″W

Dax Cathedral Cathédrale Notre-Dame de Dax
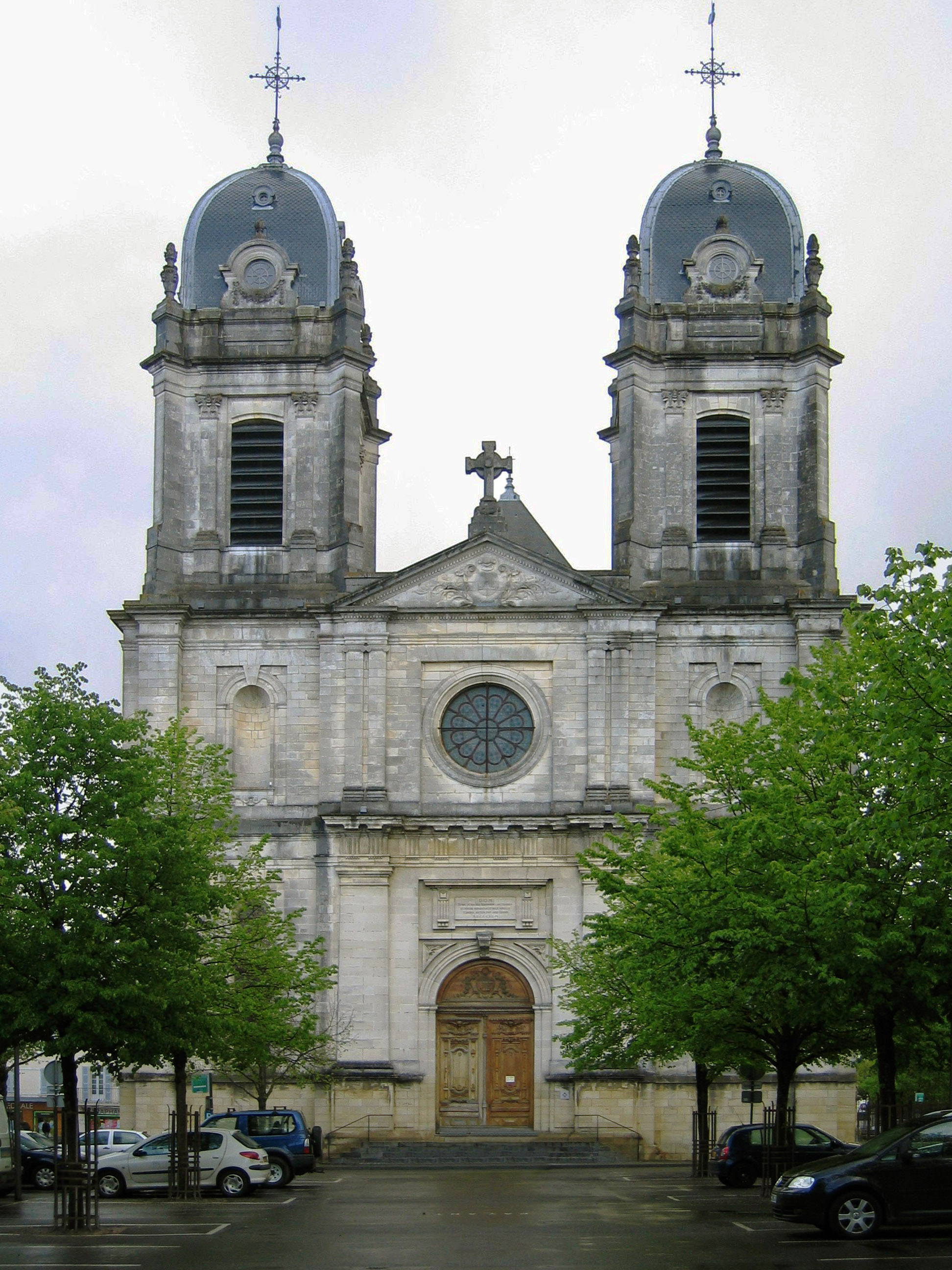
- Dax Cathedral

Religion
- Affiliation: Roman Catholic Church
- Province: Diocese of Dax
- Region: Landes
- Rite: Roman
- Ecclesiastical or organisational status: Cathedral
- Status: Active

Location
- Location: Dax, France
- Interactive map of Dax Cathedral; Cathédrale Notre-Dame de Dax

Architecture
- Type: church
- Style: Gothic, Romanesque
- Groundbreaking: 13th century
- Completed: 19th century

Dax Cathedral (French: Cathédrale Notre-Dame de Dax) is a Roman Catholic church in the town of Dax in the Landes département of France.

The diocese of Dax was not restored after the French Revolution but with several others, including Aire, was added to the Diocese of Bayonne by the Concordat of 1801. In 1817 the former dioceses of Dax and of Aire were again separated from that of Bayonne and joined to form the new Diocese of Aire and Dax, of which the bishop's seat was at Aire Cathedral.

In 1833 the bishop's seat was officially transferred to Dax and to Dax Cathedral. Aire Cathedral remains as a co-cathedral.

Dax Cathedral is a national monument of France.

== History ==
In the late 13th century, when the town of Dax was at the height of its prosperity, the bishops had a number of ecclesiastical buildings constructed, among which was a new cathedral on the site of an ancient Romanesque sanctuary which had become too cramped. This Gothic structure collapsed in 1646; all that remains of it is the magnificent Portal of the Apostles in the north transept: 12 metres high and 8 metres wide, this doorway contains a quantity of beautiful sculptures, fairly rare in the south of France, despite some mutilations and damage incurred during the passage of time.

== Building ==
Apart from the portal, which was classed as a national monument of France in its own right in 1884, the present cathedral was built from 1694 onwards in a plain style of classical inspiration. The main façade and south elevation have a massive, almost austere, appearance. The north elevation however, which looks onto a small square in the historical centre of the town, does not lack charm, despite a certain rigidity.

The dome over the crossing is decorated with murals. The quire houses the old stalls (16th century) of the canons, saved from the former cathedral. The mid-18th century high altar and the altar of the Virgin Mary are of polychromatic marble and are the work of the Mazzetti brothers, originally from Switzerland but resident in Avignon. The organ loft, of the late 17th century, was the work of Caular, a local ebonist. After its recent restoration this organ loft is considered one of the most beautiful in France.

The building also contains a number of paintings, among them "Jesus and His Disciples" by Gerrit van Honthorst (17th century), and the "Adoration of the Shepherds" by Hans von Aachen (late 16th century).
