= Aire Cathedral =

Church in France

Coordinates: 43°42′2″N 0°15′44″W

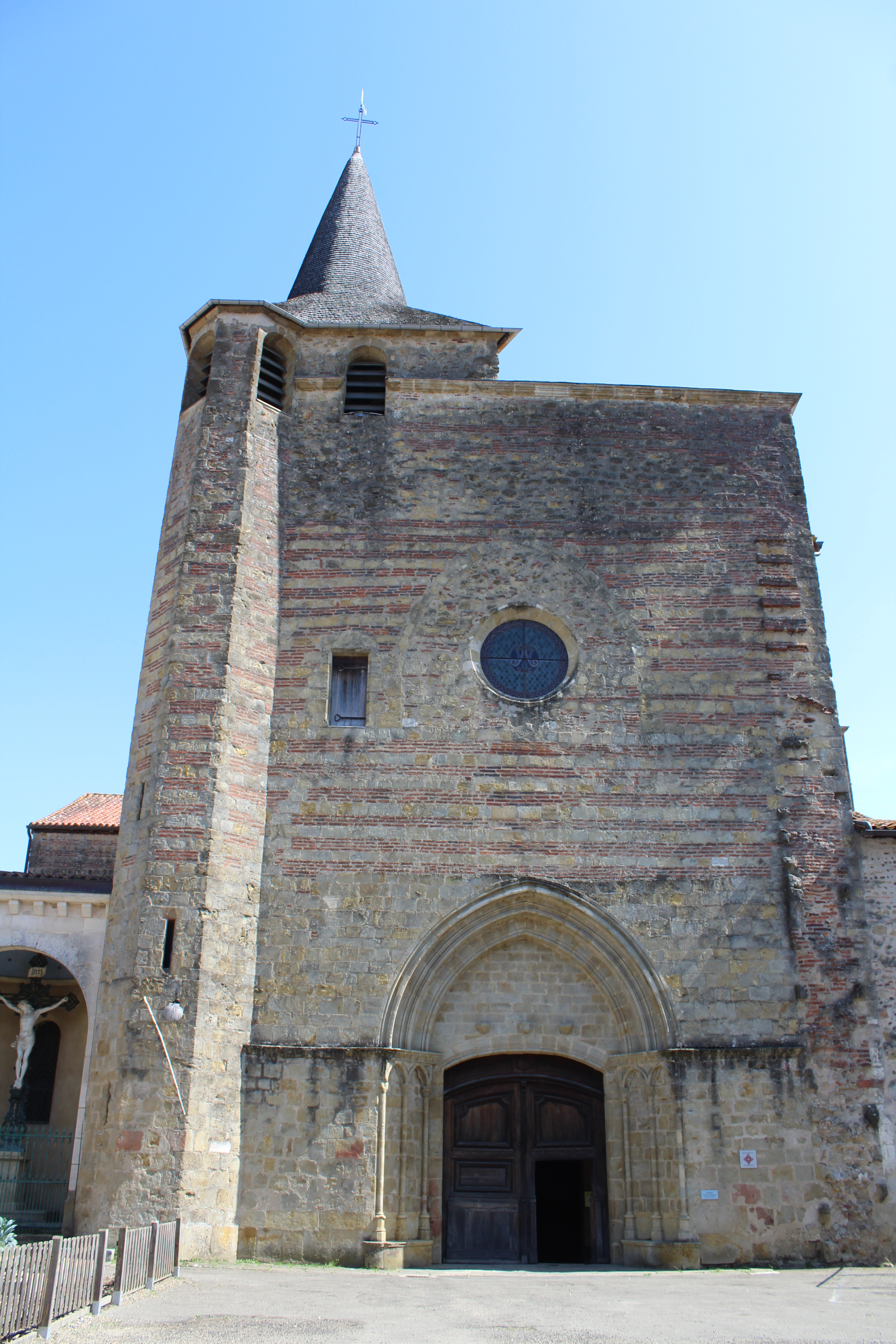
Aire Cathedral

Aire Cathedral (French: Cathédrale Saint-Jean-Baptiste d'Aire) is a Roman Catholic church dedicated to Saint John the Baptist in the town of Aire-sur-l'Adour in the Landes département of France.

It was the seat of the Bishops of Aire until the diocese was abolished in 1801 and again from 1822 when the diocese was restored; in 1857 it was renamed the Diocese of Aire and Dax. In 1933 the bishop moved to Dax, making Dax Cathedral his seat, when the cathedral at Aire became a co-cathedral.

It was listed as a national monument in 1906.

== History ==
The cathedral is situated in the lower town, where the bishops used to live. In origin a structure of the 11th and 12th centuries, it was subject to much alteration between the 14th and 17th centuries and its present appearance shows a variety of styles. The great rotunda on the chevet is especially noticeable. From the 12th century there remain three bays and an apse.

The severe 13th century façade, surmounted by a tower with a slate roof, has a simple vaulted portal with a pointed arch. The present sacristy is in origin a chapter house of the 14th century, with Gothic vaulting supported by central pillars; this is of Tolosan construction and evokes the "palm trees" of the Dominicans. The nave has ogive vaults of the 14th century. The quire is flanked by four apsidioles giving onto the transept. The organs and side-altars are of the late 18th century, as are the stalls, the high altar and the rest of the handsome furnishings.

While the apse is being extended towards the park, the orangery, a stone building of the 17th century, is being used for temporary exhibitions.

The overall dimensions of the cathedral are 48 metres in length, 8 metres in width across the nave and 15 metres in height to the highest point of the vault.

== Pilgrimage ==
Aire Cathedral marks a stage on the Via Podiensis, one of the pilgrimage routes of the Way of St. James of Compostela, running from Le Puy-en-Velay to Santiago de Compostela via the Pass of Roncevaux.
