= Florian Cazalot =

French rugby union player

- Born: Florian Cazalot; 22 April 1985 (age 41) Aire-sur-l'Adour France
- Height: 1.83 m (6 ft 0 in)
- Weight: 106 kg (234 lb)

Rugby union career
- Position: Hooker
Senior career
Years	Team	Apps	(Points)
2005-2009	Section Paloise		
2009-	FC Lourdes		
International career
Years	Team	Apps	(Points)
2004-2006	France U21	4	(5)

Florian Cazalot (born 22 April 1985 in Aire-sur-l'Adour, Landes) is a rugby union player, who plays as prop or hooker for FC Lourdes (1.83 m, 106 kg).

Before joining FC Lourdes in 2009, Cazalot had represented Section Paloise since the 2005/06 season.

== Honours ==
=== International ===
- Under 18 internationals: three games in 2003 (Wales, Scotland, England).
- Under 21 internationals:
  - 2004 : Played in the World Championships in Scotland, two games (Italy, Argentina).
  - 2006 : Called up to the World Championships in France, under Damien Weber, but did not play
  - 2 caps, 1 try in 2005-2006 (Ireland, Wales)
