= Clarence P. Cazalot Jr. =

Chief Executive Officer of Marathon Oil Corporation

Clarence Cazalot
- Born: Clarence P. Cazalot Jr. 1950 (age 75–76); New Orleans, Louisiana, US
- Education: Louisiana State University
- Occupation: Retired Chief Executive Officer
- Title: President and Chief Executive Officer of Marathon Oil Corporation
- Term: January 1, 2002 – 2012
- Board member of: Marathon Oil Corporation, Baker Hughes, Oil and Natural Gas Industry Labor-Management Committee
- Awards: Woodrow Wilson Award (2008); John Rogers Award (2010)

Clarence Peter Cazalot Jr. (born 1950) was president and chief executive of the Houston-based Marathon Oil Corporation. Since he took over control of the company in 2002, Marathon has expanded abroad with investments in the nascent gas industry of Equatorial Guinea and oil in Gabon, Libya and Norway. Its upstream earnings from overseas projects have been tripled and Marathon is beginning to sell off the smaller assets.

A trained geologist, Cazalot doesn't come from a tycoon background and spent much of his career doing technical work for Texaco. However, he benefited from the decades of experience in offshore drilling and, particularly, in laying pipelines, getting three high-profile roles managing Texaco's international production divisions. After joining Marathon in 2000, he quickly improved the company's bargaining situation with a somewhat cooperative approach to developing energy markets and pricing, instead putting a strategic focus on technology.

Throughout his career, Cazalot has financed acquisitions of foreign supplies by establishing relationships with research facilities and lowering production costs rather than seeking international lending. His corporate focus is now on gas commercialization, and while it has to deliver the company any "breakthrough" technologies, he has previously worked with oil completion technologies. Marathon's subsidiary, Marathon Ashland Petroleum, is the fifth largest petroleum refiner in the United States.

It has also improved the company's debt-position and made Cazalot an immensely wealthy man. He earned a reported $6.5 million in compensation in 2008, making him nominally one of the highest paid executives in Houston. He is a member of the board of Baker Hughes and the Oil and Natural Gas Industry Labor-Management Committee. He is a general member of the Council on Competitiveness, the exclusive All-American Wildcatters Association, a number of other industry associations, and several local business groups in the Greater Houston area.

== Early life ==
Cazalot was born in New Orleans.

He received a bachelor's degree in geology from Louisiana State University. He was awarded an Honorary Doctorate of Humane Letters in May 2007 from Louisiana State University.

== Career ==
=== Texaco ===
Cazalot entered the oil business less than one year after graduating from university when he was contracted by Texaco as a geophysicist in 1972, doing testing on offshore oil wells in the Gulf of Mexico. He worked for the company's exploration division for almost twenty years in various positions.

Cazalot's first major promotion was to the Coral Gables, Florida office in 1992, being elected a vice president of Texaco and serving as president of the Latin America/West Africa (LA/WA) division. He succeeded C. Robert "Bob" Black, who had been with the company for thirty-four years. It was from this office that Cazalot brokered his first oil export deals with European countries.

Cazalot was involved in a series of projects in the marketing and exploration divisions from 1994 through 1997, before deciding to return to management.

Texaco had announced a restructuring program in July 1994 which it expected would see about 2,500 jobs cut over the next year. Cazalot assumed the presidency of the company's exploration division in March to oversee its reorganization, and handle the first of the job cuts, in September. He decided to consolidate the domestic exploration and production offices into four regional subdivisions, down from seven; most jobs were cut in New Orleans and Denver. The Houston office was made responsible for support functions, such as general accounting and paying out royalties, which had previously been performed at field offices stretching from Midland, Ohio to Denver to Bakersfield, California.

Cazalot was promoted to a position in the Middle East, bearing the title "President for international production in Europe, Eurasia and the Middle East", in December 1997. In the 1999 restructuring, he was promoted to a third position, bearing the title "President of international production operations".

=== President of Marathon ===
Upon leaving Texaco in late 1999, Cazalot joined USX Corporation and Marathon Oil, serving as president of Marathon from March 2000 until 2001.

Cazalot's first major investment was into oil and gas properties in Equatorial Guinea. A "syndicate of underwriters" helped the company raise a billion dollars in long-term debt at low rates to finance the acquisition. It was the largest borrowing Marathon had ever underwritten and, because it was repaid so quickly, cemented the company's reputation for conservative financial strategies.

=== CEO of Marathon ===
Cazalot succeeded George A. Manos as CEO of Marathon on January 1, 2002, when USX's steel and energy businesses separated. In his first year, he more than quadrupled net income by increasing production, while cutting $150 million worth of exploration and production costs.

In September 2003 the company was restructured. Around 265 jobs were cut and its domestic offices were consolidated into two business units, Northern and Southern.

William Schwind, vice president of Marathon, retired in August 2009. As with Cazalot, the board named him vice president after the corporate separation. Cazalot described him as "an essential element" of Marathon's success.

As CEO of Marathon in 2009, Cazalot earned a total compensation of $6,571,194, which included a base salary of $1,400,000, a cash bonus of $2,100,000, options granted of $2,845,791, and other compensation of $225,403.

Cazalot retired in 2012.

== Industry associations ==
- In April 2002, Cazalot joined the Baker Hughes board of directors.
- Cazalot is a member of the All-American Wildcatters Association, a private club founded by Duke Rudman in 1969 which has become a sort of fraternity for many of the oil industry's most influential families and potentates.
