= Barcelonne-du-Gers =

- Commune
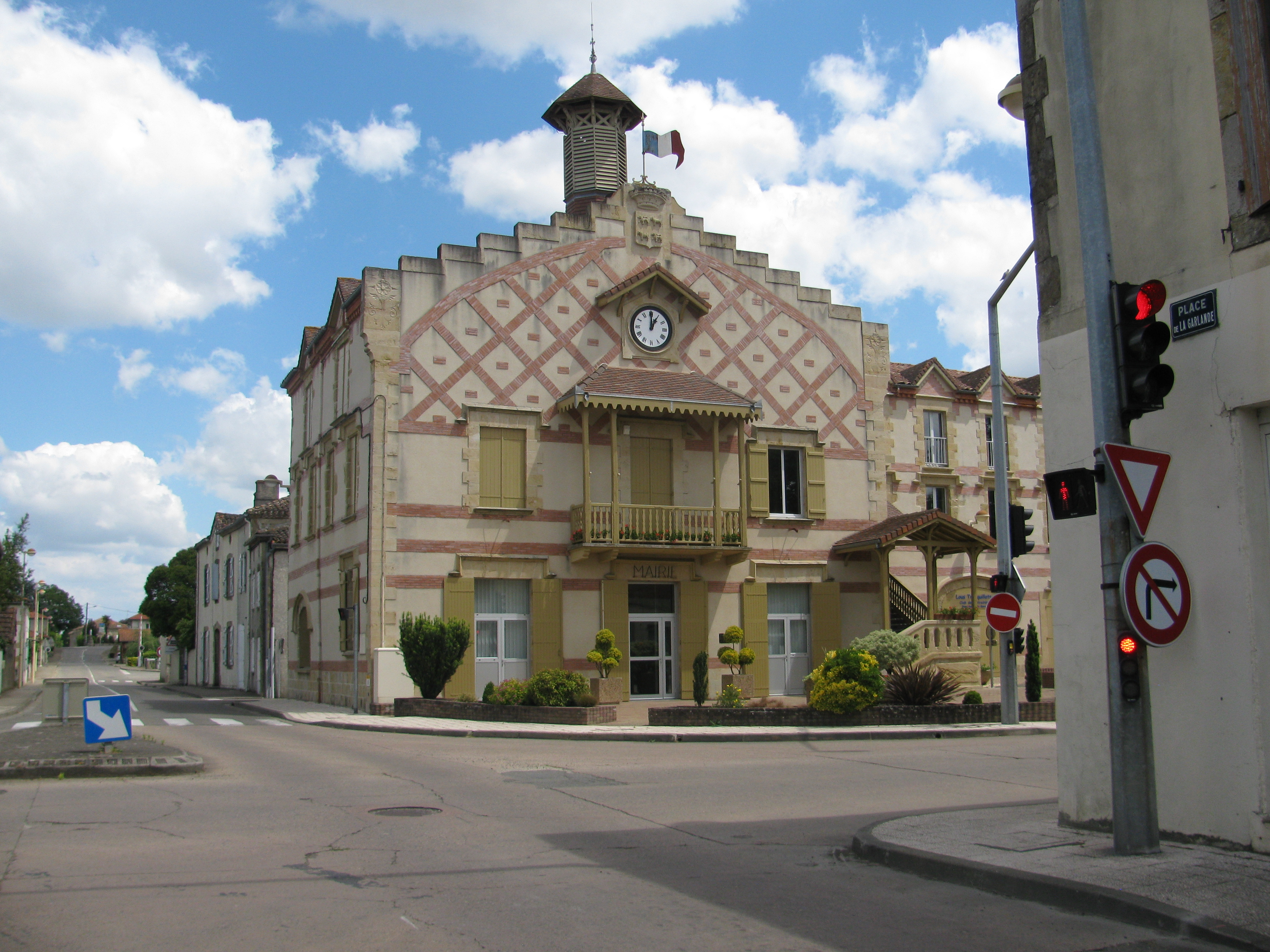
- The town hall in Barcelonne-du-Gers

- Coat of arms
- Location of Barcelonne-du-Gers
- Location within France Location within Occitanie
- Coordinates: 43°42′15″N 0°14′05″W
- Country: France
- Region: Occitania
- Department: Gers
- Arrondissement: Mirande
- Canton: Adour-Gersoise
- Intercommunality: Aire-sur-l'Adour

Government
  - Mayor (2020–2026): Cédric Berdoulet
- Area^{1}: 20.29 km^{2} (7.83 sq mi)
- Highest elevation: 161 m (528 ft)
- Lowest elevation: 76 m (249 ft)
- Population (2023): 1,401
  - Density: 69.05/km^{2} (178.8/sq mi)
- Time zone: UTC+01:00 (CET)
  - Summer (DST): UTC+02:00 (CEST)
- INSEE/Postal code: 32027 /32720
- ^{1} French Land Register data, which excludes lakes, ponds, glaciers > 1 km^{2} (0.386 sq mi or 247 acres) and river estuaries.

Barcelonne-du-Gers (French pronunciation: [baʁsəlɔn dy ʒɛʁ(s)]; Occitan: Barçalona de Gers) is a commune in the Gers department in southwestern France.

== Geography ==
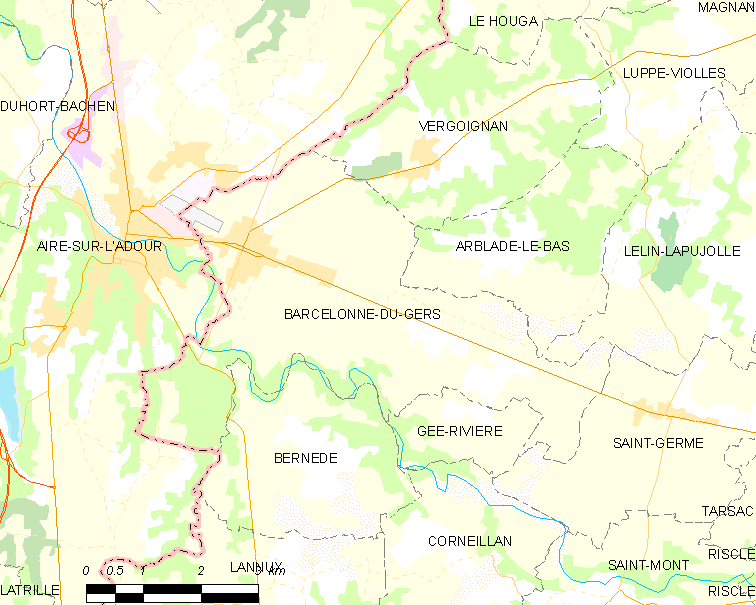
Barcelonne-du-Gers and its surrounding communes

== Population ==
Historical population
Year	Pop.	±% p.a.
1968	1,190	—
1975	1,134	−0.69%
1982	1,183	+0.61%
1990	1,312	+1.30%
1999	1,303	−0.08%
2007	1,322	+0.18%
2012	1,340	+0.27%
2017	1,372	+0.47%
2023	1,401	+0.35%
Source: INSEE

== See also ==
- Communes of the Gers department
