= Code officiel géographique =

The Code officiel géographique (English: Official geographic code) is a document listing the INSEE code which defines some French geographical codes.
