= Spanish-style bullfighting =

Type of bullfighting

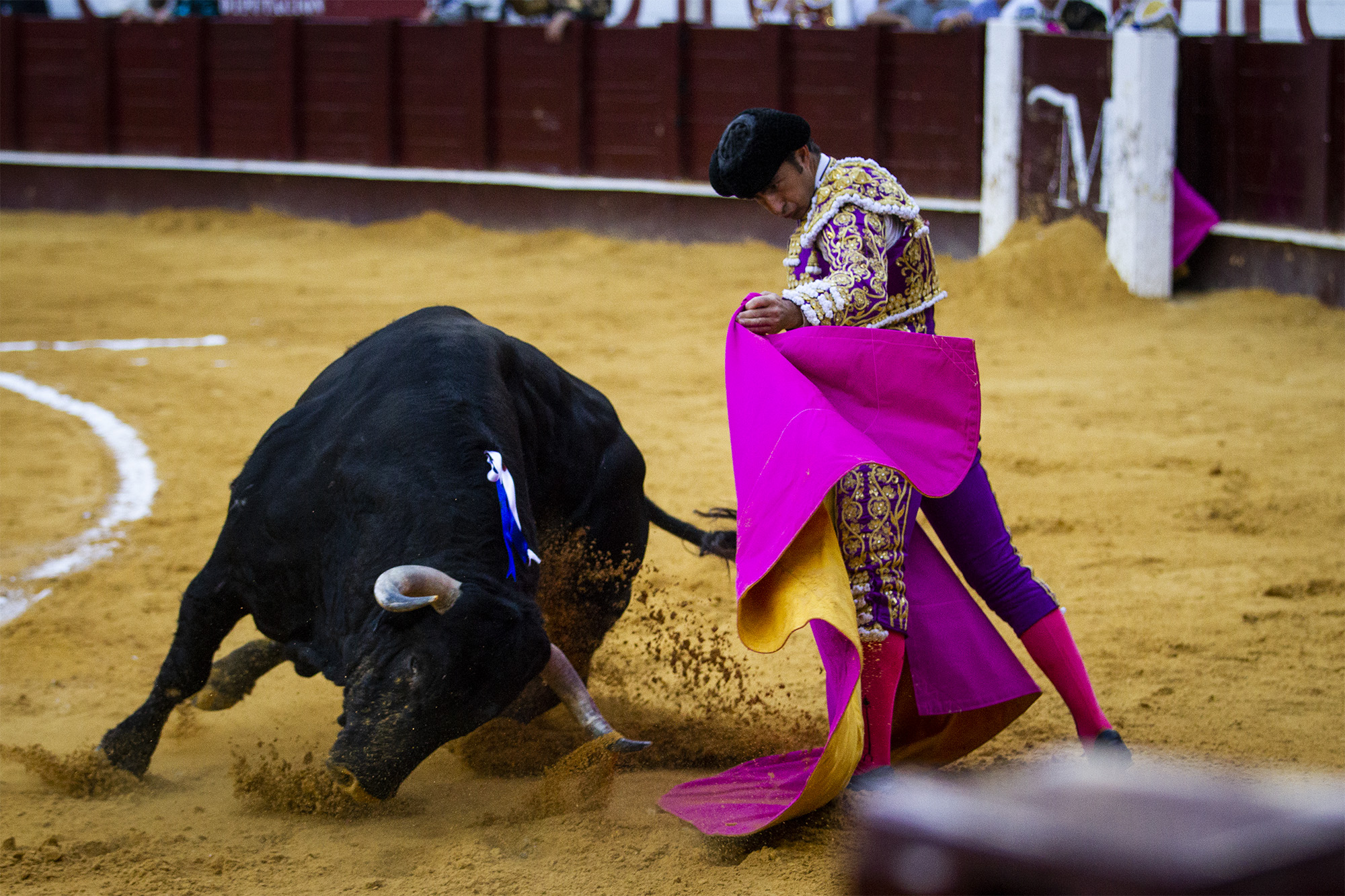
A Spanish-style bullfight in the Plaza de toros de La Malagueta in Málaga, Spain, 2018

Spanish-style bullfighting is a type of bullfighting that is practiced in several Spanish-speaking countries: Spain, Mexico, Ecuador, Venezuela, Peru, as well as in parts of southern France and Portugal. In Colombia it has been outlawed but is being phased out with a full ban coming in effect in 2027. This style of bullfighting involves a physical contest with humans (and other animals) attempting to publicly subdue, immobilize, or kill a bull. The most common bull used is the Spanish Fighting Bull (Toro Bravo), a type of cattle native to the Iberian Peninsula. This style of bullfighting is seen to be both a sport and performance art. The red colour of the cape is a matter of tradition—bulls are color blind. They attack moving objects; the brightly colored cape is used to mask blood stains.

In a traditional corrida, three toreros (or matadores) each fight against two out of a total of six fighting bulls to death, each bull being at least four years old and weighing up to about 600 kg (1,300 lb) with a minimum weight limit of 460 kg (1,010 lb). Bullfighting season in Spain runs from March to October. The practice is also known as a corrida de toros ("bull-running"), toreo or tauromaquia (English: tauromachy). Since the late 1980s, bullfighting in Spain has declined in popularity due to animal welfare concerns, its association with blood sport, and its links to nationalism.

== History ==
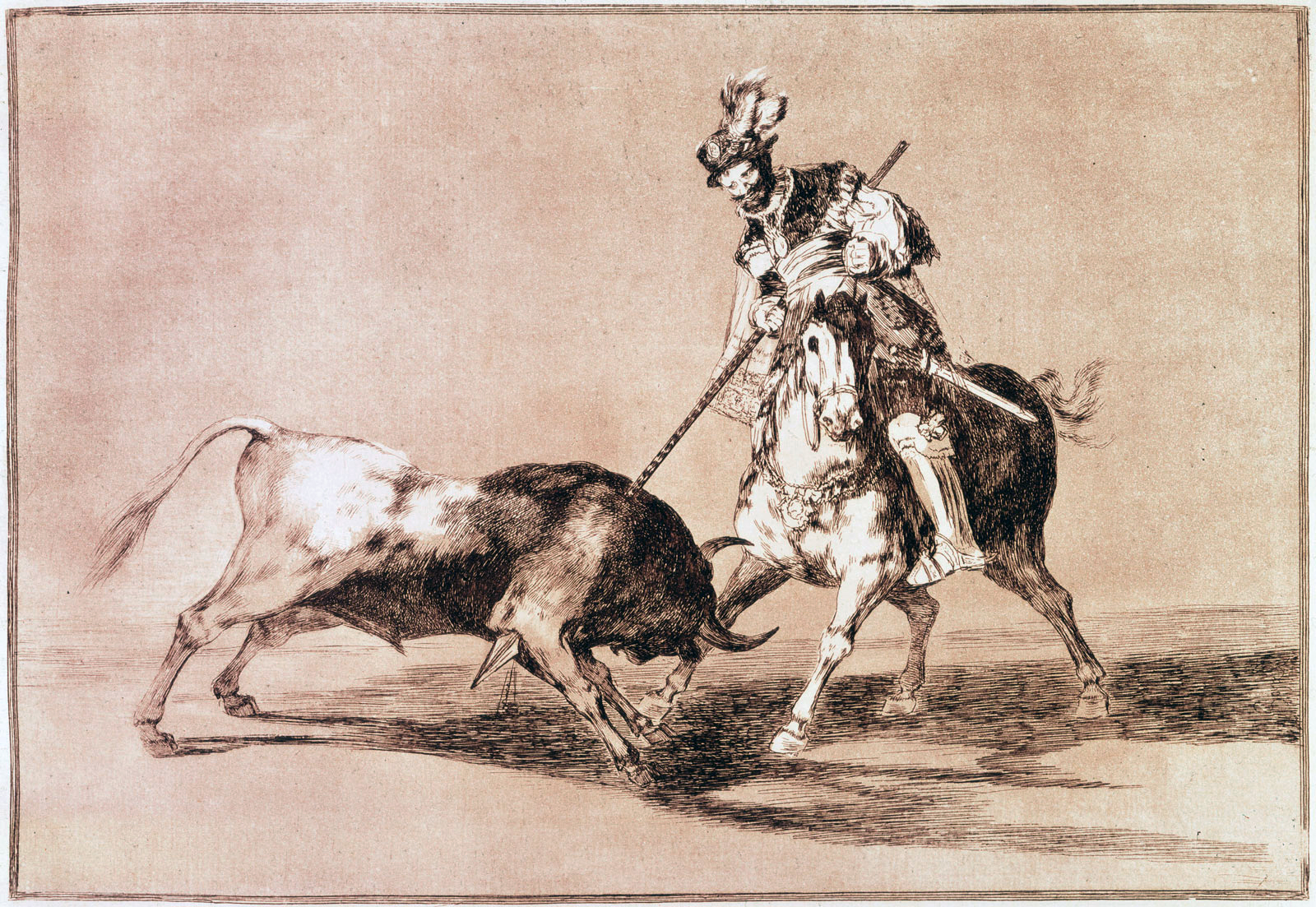
El Cid Campeador lanceando otro toro by Francisco Goya, 1816

=== Pre-Roman ===
Most historians trace festivities involving bulls to prehistoric times, as a trend that once extended through the entire Mediterranean coast and has just survived in Iberia and part of France. Early bullfights had a high mortality rate. Alejandro Recio, a Spanish historian, considers the Neolithic city of Konya, Turkey, discovered by James Mellaart in 1958, as evidence of sacrificial tauromaquia associated with traditional rituals. This claim is based on the abundance of representations of bulls, as well as on the preservation of horns and bullheads attached to walls. Since then various archeological findings have proven the uninterrupted importance of the bull as a symbol of the sun for the Iberian cults, like the presence of berracos (known in Portuguese as berrão), or the importance of the bull in the surviving Celtiberian and Celtic rituals that continued into the 21st century. These pre-Roman religions centered on the ritual sacrifice of sacred animals through direct or symbolic combat and was a likely motive for the depiction of bulls.

=== Roman ===
Bullrings are believed to originate their bullfighting tradition from Roman gladiator games. During Roman Hispania gladiators were forced to fight animals by sword, such as bulls, bears, and wolves. The Romans tried to abolish and ban the "puere" practice of bullfighting, considering it was too risky for the youth and not a proper way to worship the state deities.

=== Spanish ===
According to Frommer's Travel Guide, bullfighting in Spain traces its origins to 711 AD, with the first official bullfight, or corrida de toros, being held in honor of the coronation of King Alfonso VIII. Once part of the Roman Empire, Spain owes its bullfighting tradition in part to gladiator games. At first, bullfighting was done on horseback and was reserved for Spanish aristocracy.

=== Arab prohibition ===
During the Arab rule of Iberia, the ruling class tried to ban the practice of bullfighting, considering it a pagan celebration and heresy. Bullfighting was illegal in all Arab territory but became a mark of identity and resistance for Christian Iberians, especially for the nobility that started using it as a way to gain prestige. At first, bullfighting was done on horseback and was reserved for Spanish aristocracy; in contests the "fighters" were referred to as rejoneadores.

=== Catholic excommunication ===
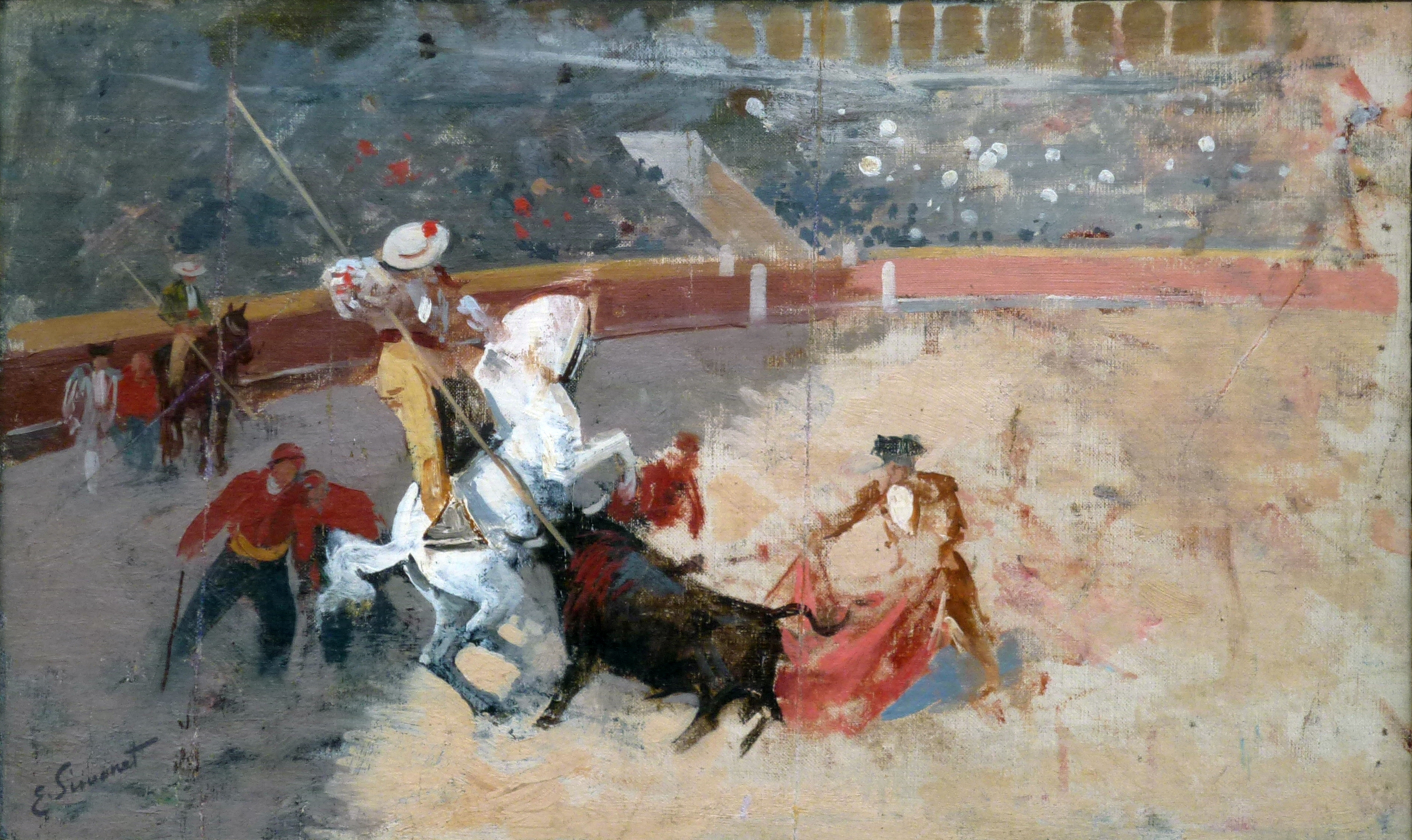
Enrique Simonet's La suerte de varas (1899) depicts Spanish-style bullfighting in a bullring in Madrid, Spain. The painting illustrates the first stage of this type of bullfighting.

In the 16th century Pope Pius V banned bullfighting for its ties to paganism and for the danger it posed to the participants. Anyone who would sponsor, watch or participate in a bullfight was to be excommunicated by the Church. Spanish and Portuguese bullfighters kept the tradition alive covertly, and his successor, Pope Gregory XIII, took efforts to relax this penalty. Pope Gregory advised bullfighters to not use the sport as way to honor Jesus Christ or the Saints, as was typical in Spain and Portugal.

=== The Bourbons ===
King Philip V, the first King of Spain of Bourbon descent, ended bullfighting in the country because he believed it was in poor taste for nobles to practice such a bloody sport. The change in bullfighting standards ran parallel to the discontent of the foreign rule of the Bourbons, and their lack of interest in understanding the politics, economics or culture of their new kingdom culminated in the Esquilache Riots of 1766. New forms of bullfighting continued to develop as decrees against the activity proved largely ineffective. After growing in popularity in Spain, King Charles III attempted to ban bullfighting in 1771. He attempted to reduce the social tension by building two of the eldest and largest bullfighting rings in Madrid as part of an offensive to fix the resentment some nobles and other powerful groups held towards the Crown's authority and actions. King Charles IV attempted to formally ban the sport again after his predecessor made concessions. King Joseph Bonaparte reversed this decision by hosting a bullfight during his coronation in 1808.

=== Joaquín Rodríguez Costillares ===
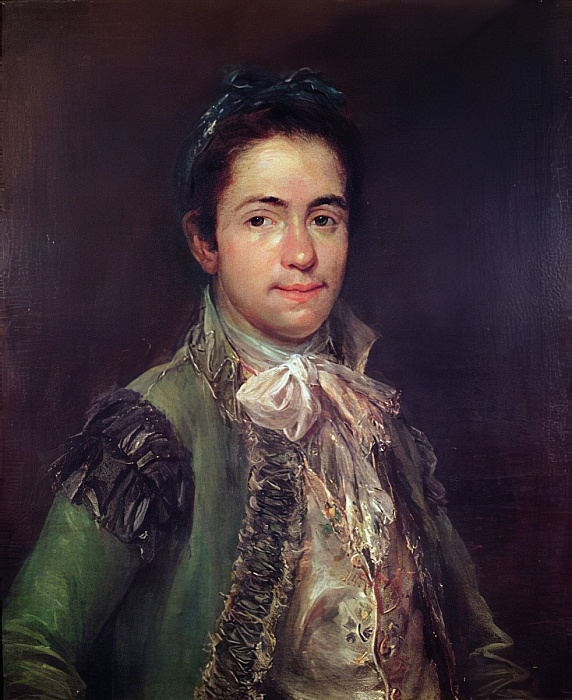
Costillares is credited with modernizing the art of bullfighting.

Costillares (1743–1800) was a Spanish bullfighter from Seville who has been credited with founding modern Spanish-style bullfighting. He established the "cuadrillas tradition" where teams of two or three banderilleros and two picadores taunt the bull. He also organized the tercios de lidia ("thirds of fight") borrowed from the theatre; invented the Veronica and other basic cape movements as well as the current traje de luces ("suit of light"); and created the cape maneuvers (muleta), typical in this style of bullfighting since the 19th century.

== Participants ==
Each matador has six assistants: two picadores ("lancers") mounted on horseback, three banderilleros ("flagmen"), and a mozo de espada ("lad of the swords"). Collectively they compose a cuadrilla or team of bullfighters. The crew also includes an ayuda (aide to sword servant) and subalternos (subordinates) including at least two peones (pages, singular peón).

== Parts of a bullfight ==
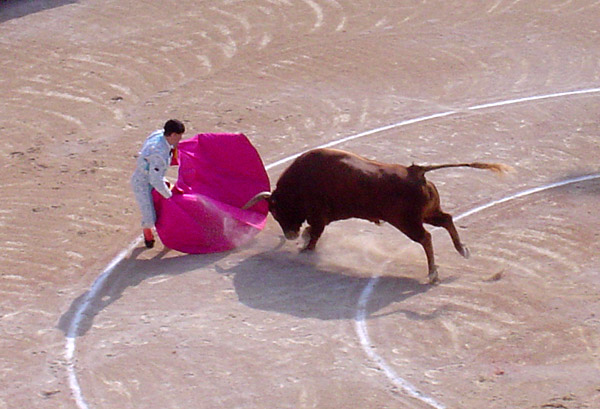
The capote (cloak) waved in front of the bull, 2005

The modern Spanish-style bullfight (corrida, "run") is highly standardized, with three distinct parts (tercios, "thirds"), the start of each of which is announced by a trumpet sound. The participants first enter the arena in a parade (paseíllo) to salute the presiding dignitary (presidente), usually accompanied by band music. The corrida begins to the tune of live-played pasodobles, many of which were composed to honour famous toreros. Torero costumes are influenced by 17th-century Andalusian clothing. Matadors are distinguished by a "suit of lights" (traje de luces), custom-made and embroidered with silver or golden thread.

The bull then enters the ring to be tested for aggressiveness by the matador and banderilleros with the magenta and gold capote (dress cape). Bulls are raised on the open range by specialist breeding estates called ganadería. The bull enters the arena with a rosette on its back bearing the colors of the estate of its origin.

=== Stage 1: Tercio de Varas ===
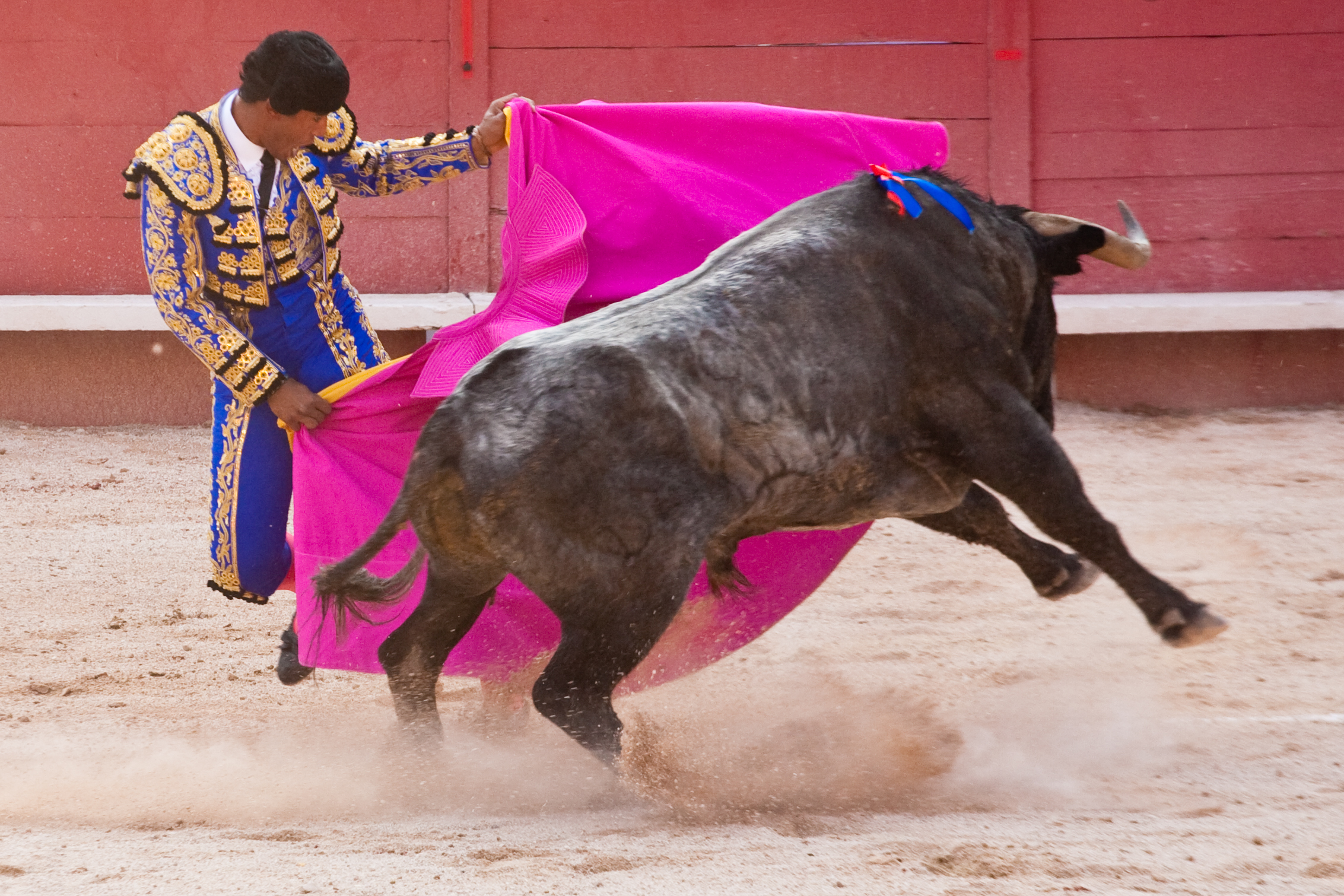
A matador performing a verónica

The first stage is called the tercio de varas ("third of lances"). The matador observes how the bull reacts to the waving of the banderilleros' cloaks. They also note vision problems, unusual head movements, or if the bull favors a part of the ring called a querencia (territory). A bull trying to reach its querencia is often more dangerous than a bull that is attacking the cape directly. The initial attack by the matador is called the suerte de capote ("act of the cape"), and there are a number of fundamental lances (or passes) that matadors make; the most common being the verónica (named after Saint Veronica), which is the act of a matador letting the cloak trail over the bull's head as it runs past.

Then two picadors enter the arena, each armed with a lance (vara) and mounted on a large heavily-padded and blindfolded horse. The entrance of the horses attracts the bull to the picadors. The picadors repeatedly drive their lances into the muscles (morrillo) of the bull's neck to weaken the animal. As a picador stabs the bull's neck, the bull charges and attempts to lift the picador's horse. If the picadors are successful, the bull will hold its head and horns lower as a result of injury and weakness during the following stages of the fight. This makes the bull less dangerous to enable the matador to perform the passes of modern bullfighting. In a mandatory step in the corrida, regulations require that a plaza judge ensures a certain number of hits are made before it is considered completed.

=== Stage 2: Tercio de Banderillas ===
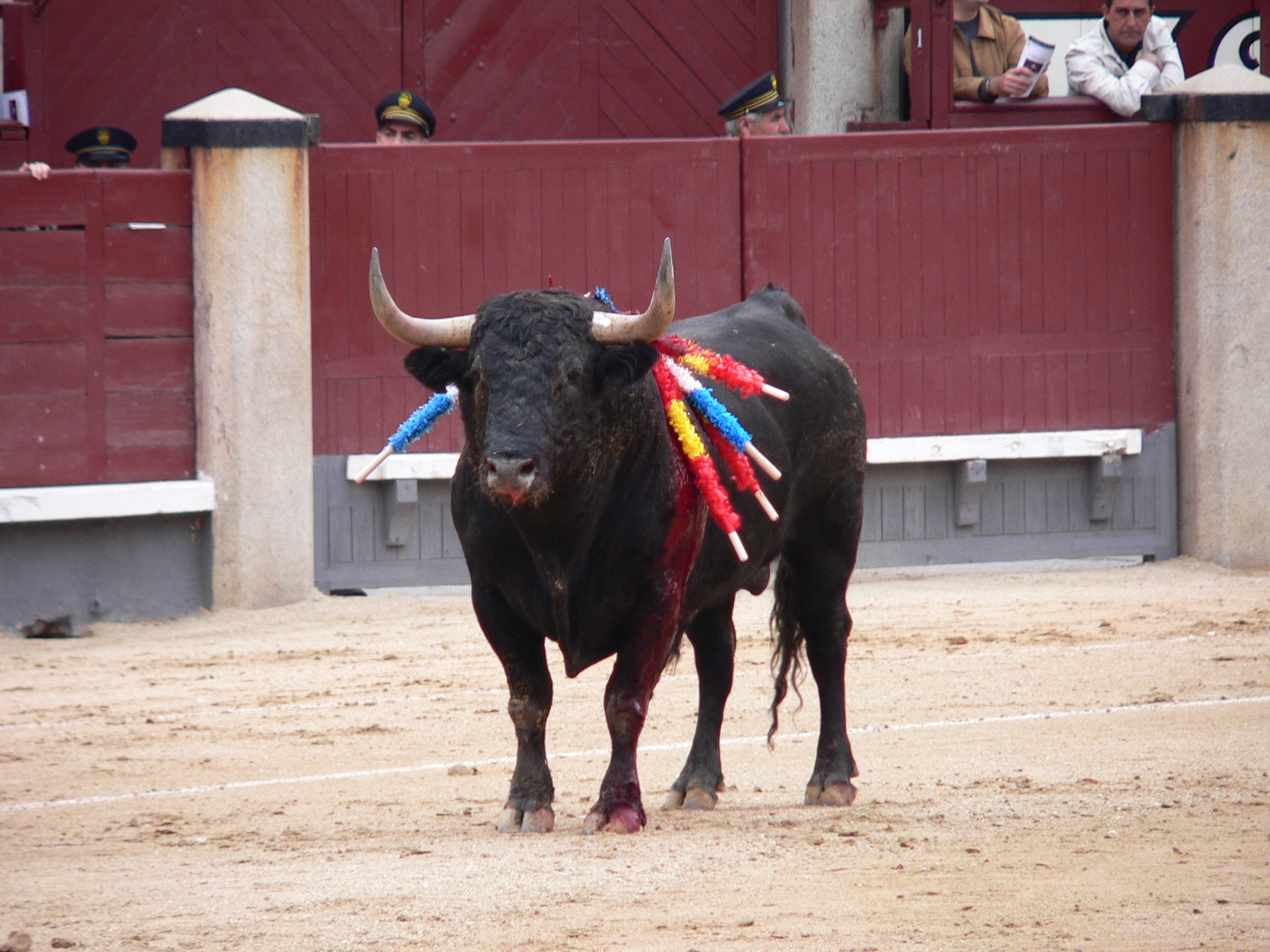
Bull in the arena with banderillas hanging down on shoulders, 2005

In the next stage—the tercio de banderillas ("third of small flag")—the matador attempts to plant two barbed or dart-like sticks known as banderillas ("little flags") onto the bull's shoulders. These weaken the ridges of neck and shoulder muscle (which set fighting bulls apart from cattle) through loss of blood, while also spurring the bull into making more aggressive charges. By this point the bull has lost a significant amount of blood, exhausting the animal. The matador then enters with his cape and sword, attempting to tire the bull further with several runs at the cape.

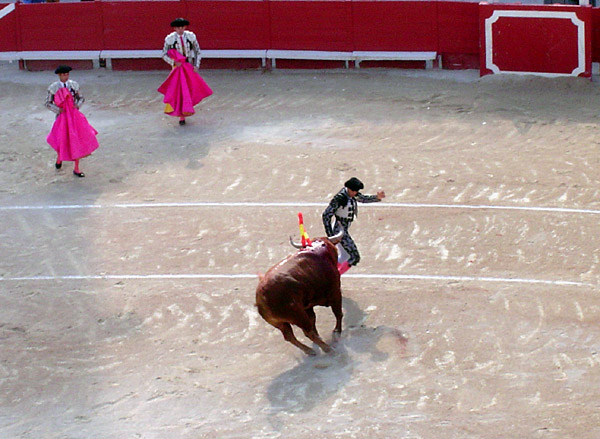
The tercio de banderillas, 2004

The matadors place the banderillas around the bull. If the presidente decides that the bull is relatively weak or unwilling to fight, they may order the use of black banderillas, considered to be a poor reflection on the breeder.

=== Stage 3: Tercio de Muerte ===
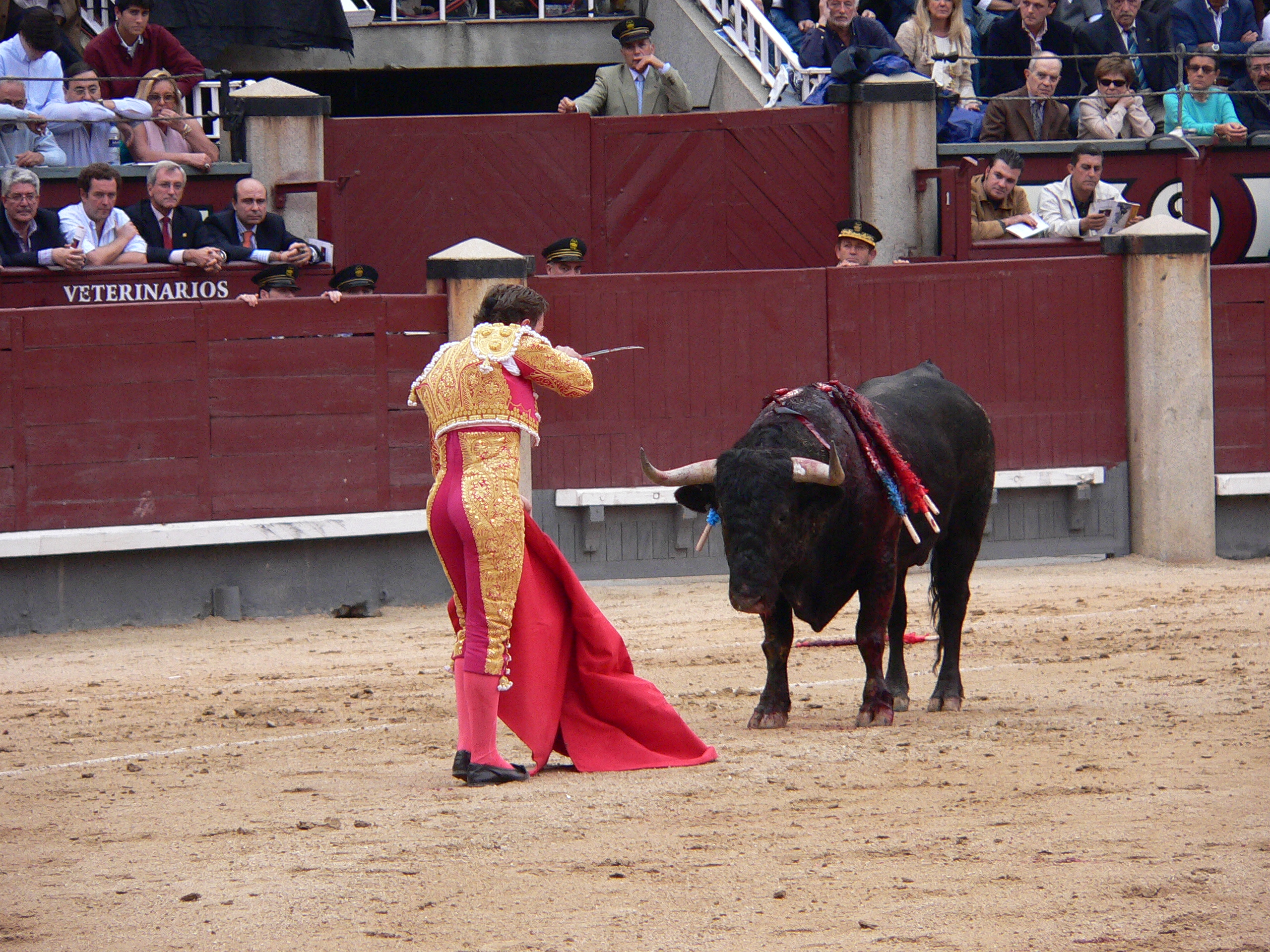
Matador in the tercio de muerte, 2005

In the third and final stage—the tercio de muerte ("third of death")—the matador re-enters the ring alone with a small red cape or muleta in one hand and a sword (estoque) in the other. This cape is stretched with a wooden dowel and, in right-handed passes, the sword as well. Having dedicated the bull to an individual or the whole audience, the matador uses his cape to attract the bull in a series of passes, demonstrating his control over it. The red colour of the cape is a matter of tradition—bulls are color blind. The movement of the cape is what irritates bulls; the colour by itself has the purpose of masking blood stains.

The faena is the entire performance combined with the muleta, which is usually broken down into a series of tandas (episodes). A typical tanda consists of three to five basic passes and then the finishing touch (remate), such as a pase de pecho, or pase de desprecio. Well-received passes are celebrated by the audience with shouts of "¡ole!". The faena ends with a final series of passes in which the matador with a muleta attempts to manoeuvre the bull into a position to stab it between the shoulder blades and through the aorta or heart. The entire part of the bullfight with the muleta is called the tercio de muerte ("third of death") or suerte de muleta ("act of muleta").

The act of thrusting the sword (estoca or estoque) is called an estocada. A clumsy estocada that fails to give a "quick and clean death" will often raise loud protests from the crowd and may ruin the whole performance. If the estocada is not successful, the matador must then perform a descabello and cut the bull's spinal cord with a second sword called verdugo, to kill it instantly and spare the animal pain. Although the matador's final blow is usually fatal, it may take the bull some time to die. A coup de grâce is therefore administered by a peón named a puntillero, using a dagger to further pierce the spinal cord. The matador must kill the bull in 15 minutes after the first muleta pass, at most. After 10 minutes, if the bull is still alive, the presidente will order an aviso, a warning given with a trumpet sound. If a further three minutes elapse, a second aviso will be given; a third and final aviso is given after a further two minutes. The presidente will then give an order to have the bull returned to its pen (corral), or, if local law so requires, to have the bull killed outside the ring. It is a dishonor for the failing matador.

The bull's body is dragged out by a team of mules. If the presidente is impressed by the performance of the bull, he orders a tour around the ring to honour the animal. Very rarely, a bull will be allowed to survive a fight as an indulgence granted in recognition of an exceptional performance. The spectators will demand an indulto from the presidente, by waving handkerchiefs before the estocada. The matador will stop and look at the presidente. If the presidente stands still, the matador will resume their action and kill the bull. But if the presidente has an orange handkerchief hung on his balcony, the matador will imitate the estocada with a banderilla or with the palm of his hand and the bull will be "freed". Such bulls are generally retired from competition and raised as studs, as their experience in the ring makes them extremely dangerous opponents. A fighting bull is never used in the ring twice, because they learn from experience, and the entire strategy of the matador is based on the assumption that the bull has not learned from previous experience. This also invalidates bulls who have been run in their estate by illegal fighters (maletillas), who in earlier times would sneak into an estate by night to practice their skills.

A trofeo (trophy) is the usual indicator of a successful faena. When the records of bullfights are kept, trofeos earned by the matador are always mentioned. If the crowd demands, the matador is allowed to take a lap of victory around the ring. If at least half of the spectators petition the presidente by waving handkerchiefs, the presidente is obliged to award the matador with one ear of the bull. To award the matador with another ear or with two ears and the tail (los máximos trofeos), depends solely on the presidente's appreciation. A matador who won at least two ears is given the permission to be carried on the shoulders of the admirers (salida en hombros). In some cities, such as Seville, three matadors take on two bulls each, and salida en hombros is only available to a matador that wins a total of three trofeos between his two bulls. In general, a matador that faces a bull that is freed is usually awarded los máximos trofeos, although only symbolically; ears or the tail can only be physically cut off of a dead bull.

== Hazards ==
Traditional Spanish-style bullfighting is normally fatal for the bull, and it is dangerous for the matador. Picadors and banderilleros are sometimes gored, but this is not common. The suertes with the capote are risky, but it is the faena, in particular the estocada, that is the most dangerous. A matador of classical (Manolete) style is trained to divert the bull with the muleta but to come close to the right horn as he makes the fatal sword-thrust between the scapulae and through the aorta. At this moment, the danger to the matador is the greatest.

Most matadors have been gored many times. A special type of surgeon has developed, in Spain and elsewhere, to treat cornadas, or horn-wounds. The bullring normally has an infirmary with an operating room, reserved for the immediate treatment of matadors with cornadas. The bullring has a chapel where a matador can pray before the corrida and where a priest can be found in case an emergency sacrament of extreme unction (also known as Anointing of the Sick or Last Rites) is needed. Gorings can result in lasting disabilities, but need not end a bullfighter's career in the ring. Juan José Padilla suffered extensive injuries at Zaragoza on 7 October 2011 when a bull gored him in the head, breaking his jaw and his skull, putting out one of his eyes, deafening him in one ear and paralyzing half his face. Nevertheless, after convalescence, he came back to the bullring and fought more bulls. On the other hand, one of Spain's first women bullfighters, Juana Cruz, was left with injuries that hindered her performance as a torera after a double goring at the Santamaría Bullring in Bogotá on 12 November 1944, and she thus soon afterwards gave up bullfighting.

As deadly as bullfighting usually is for the bull, some bullfighters have been killed in the bullring, too. Manolete, mentioned above, was one such bullfighter (gored in the leg, Linares, 29 August 1947). More recently, José Cubero Sánchez ("El Yiyo") was gored in the heart after delivering the estocada (Colmenar Viejo, 30 August 1985) less than a year after fellow Spanish bullfighter Paquirri had been gored to death at a bullfight in Cubero's presence (Pozoblanco, 26 September 1984). The first bullfighter to be killed in a bullfight in Spain in the 21st century was Víctor Barrio (gored in the chest, Teruel, 9 July 2016); his death was televised live.

== Popularity ==
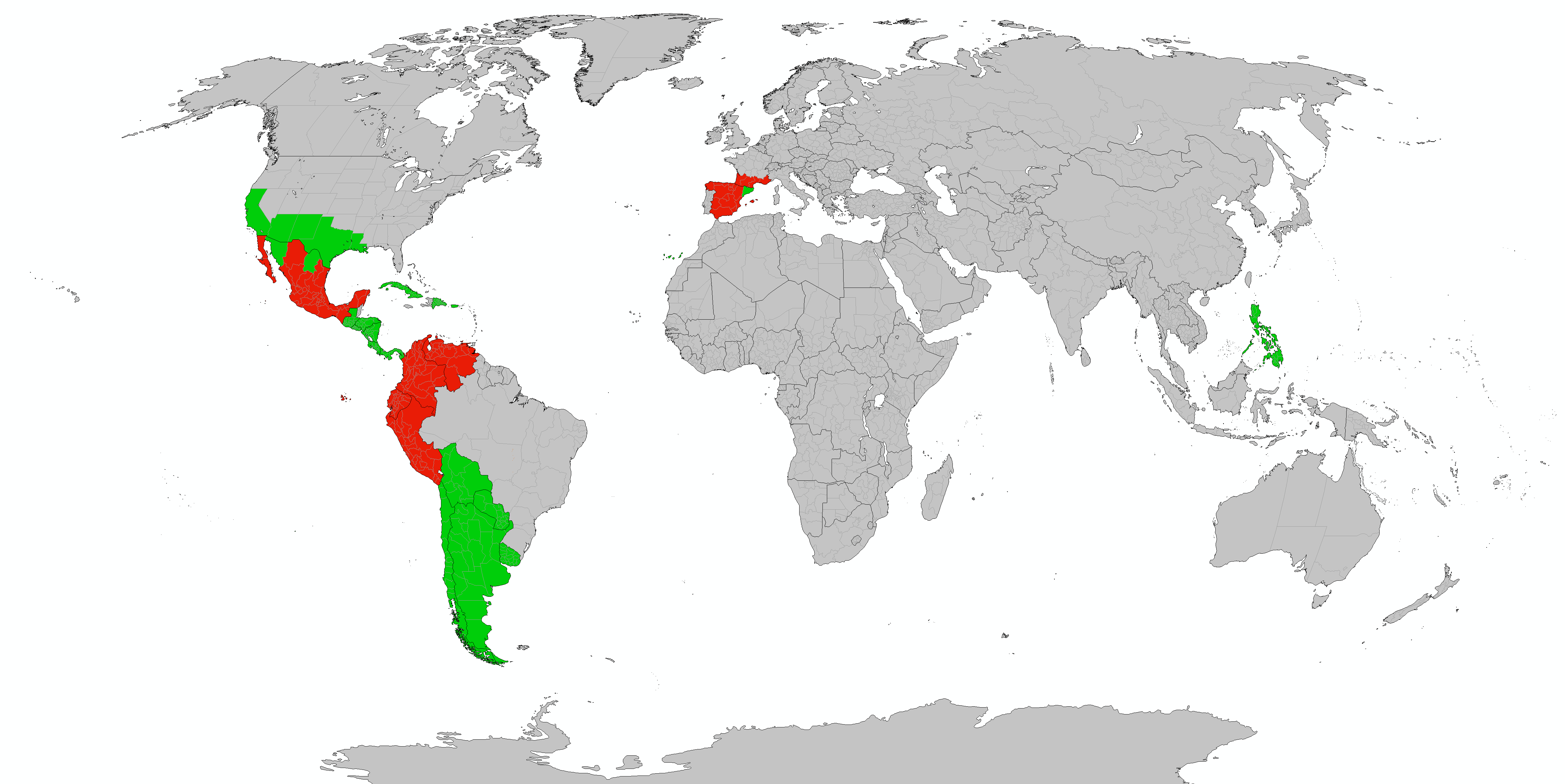
Spanish-style bullfighting around the world: Bullfighting legal Bullfighting banned, which used to be traditionally practiced Note: Some municipalities have banned bullfighting in countries and regions where it is otherwise legal.

A poll conducted in 2014–2015 by the Spanish Ministry of Culture places bullfighting 10th in the list of most popular paid leisure activities. In 2015 9.5% of Spaniards went to a paid bullfight. Among autonomous communities, Navarre headed the list, followed by Castile–León, Aragon, La Rioja, Castile–La Mancha and Extremadura. The regions least interested in bullfighting were Galicia, the Canary Islands, Catalonia and the Balearic Islands. According to the poll, during the 2014–15 period 9.5% of the potential audience (Spaniards aged 15 and higher) would have attended a corrida at least once; this amounts to over 3.5 million people. More recent statistics show that popularity is declining in Spain, as only 1.9% of the surveyed population attended a corrida in 2021–22. 1,546 bullfights took place in Spain in 2022. Compared to the 3,651 bullfights that took place in 2007, a 57.7% decrease over the past 15 years suggests the events' decline in popularity. This can even be seen between 2007 and 2011 with a 37.3% decrease in the number of bullfights.

== Women in bullfighting ==
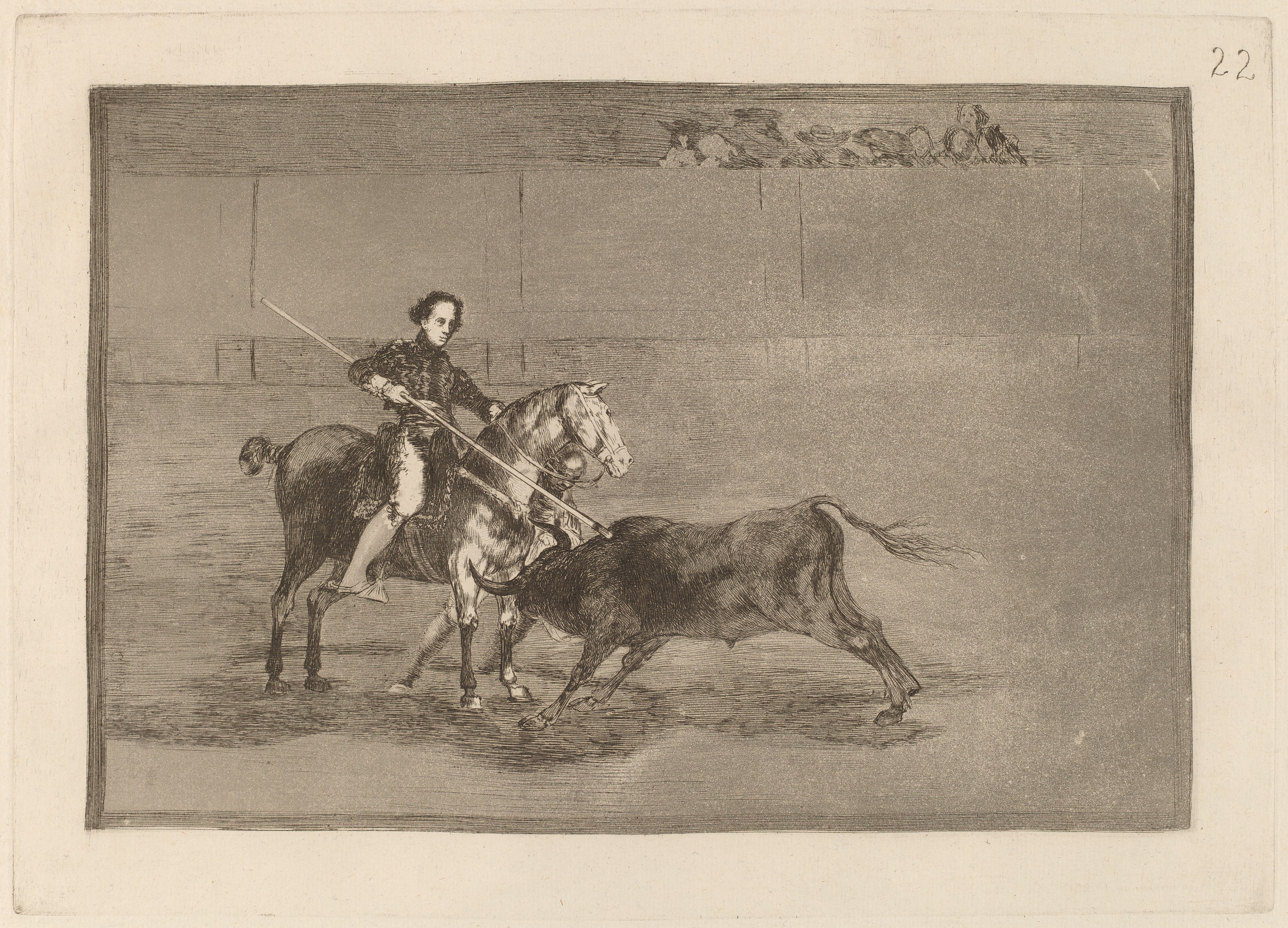
La Pajuelera by Goya

The history of female bullfighters participating in Spanish-style bullfighting has been traced to the sport's earliest renditions, namely during the late 1700s and early 1800s. Francisco Goya, an 18th-century Spanish painter, first depicted a female bullfighter in his work La Pajuelera (part of his La Tauromaquia series), which depicts Nicolasa Escamilla sparring with a bull on horseback. The Spanish government's Minister of Interior Juan de la Cierva banned women from participating in the sport from 1909 to 1934, following the Second Spanish Republic's liberation of women until 1939. This was in reaction to successful toreras of the day such as La Reverte. On 10 August 1974, under the dictatorship of Francisco Franco, women were once again allowed to bullfight. María de los Ángeles Hernández Gómez was the first woman to earn her bullfighting license (torera) after the ban was lifted. During the Spanish Civil War of the 1930s, women were forced to exile in other Spanish-speaking countries and the United States in order to continue bullfighting. Throughout the 1980s women had difficulty completing their alternativa, a ceremony where a bullfighter becomes a matador, due to the social pressures of the decade.

== Anti-bullfighting movement ==
=== Generation of '98, "Non-European" elements of Spanish culture ===
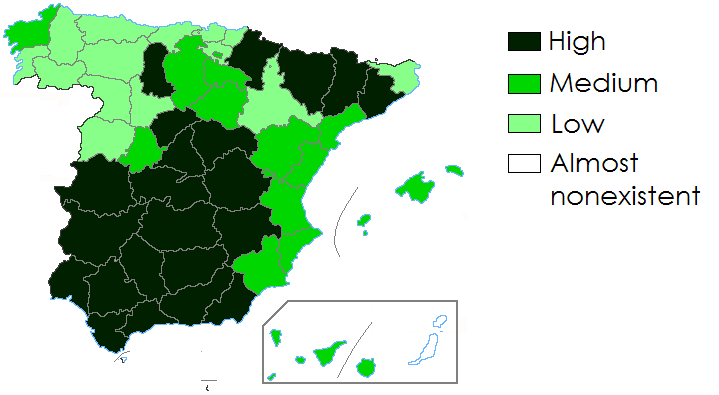
Prevalence of bullfighting across Spanish provinces during the 19th century

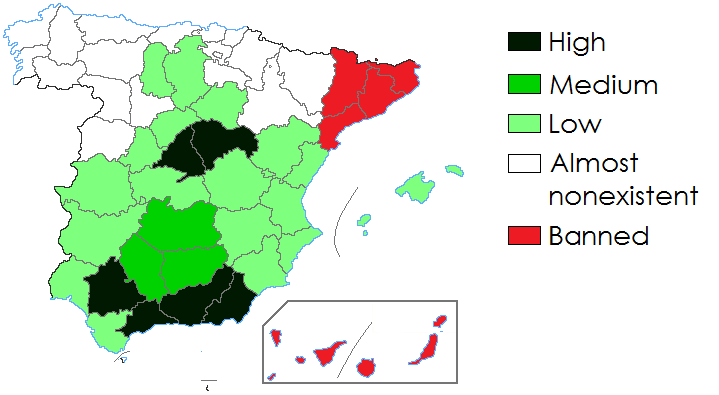
Prevalence of bullfighting across Spanish provinces during the 21st century

Activism against bullfighting has existed in Spain since the beginning of the early 20th century, when a group of intellectuals, belonging to the Generation of '98, rallied against the popularity of bullfighting and other social issues, dismissing them as "non-European" elements of Spanish culture, which were to blame for the country's social and economic backwardness.

=== Canary Islands ===
In April of 1991, the Canary Islands Parliament passed an animal protection law that banned 'bloody animal spectacles', including bullfighting, effectively prohibiting them as acts of cruelty, though bullfighting had already ceased 10 years earlier due to lack of interest or profitability.

=== Catalonia ===
In the 21st century, bullfighting has come under increasing attack from animal rights activists and political actors for its links to Spanish nationalism. In Catalonia, a concern for animal welfare, a consideration of this type of bullfighting as "backwards" or "archaic", a detachment from the stereotypes of Spanish national identity, and nationalist sentiment in Catalonia has played a key role in the region-wide ban of the practice, which was demanded by popular petition (Iniciativa Legislativa Popular, i.e. Popular Legislative Initiative) and passed by absolute majority by the Catalan Parliament on 28 July 2010, entering into effect on 1 January 2012. The ban was a modification of the law on animal protection and prohibited "'bullfights and bull-related spectacles that include the killing of the animal and the use of instruments such as the pica (lance), banderillas (a harpoon-like spike), and the estoc (sword)', a prohibition that excludes festivities involving bulls where the animal is not killed, namely, the correbous."

However, more than six years later and due to the appeal lodged by the Partido Popular, this democratic decision was overruled by the Spanish Constitutional Court in October of 2016, ruling the banning as "unconstitutional", alleging that bullfighting is a cultural legacy belonging to all Spaniards, and arguing that only the State has the competence to protect and regulate cultural heritage. More clearly, there was an undercurrent to this decision based on Spanish nationalist sentiment and a certain anti-Catalan sentiment (or Catalanophobia), which believed the banning an affront to the Spanish nation specifically by the Catalan people, considering the fact that the Canary Islands had long since banned bullfighting yet no-one in Spain had reacted to this.

Despite this overruling, bullfighting has effectively ceased in Catalonia since the prohibition was originally passed, in part due to it's low profitability, since bullfights, in the few bullrings that were still functioning, only attracted a handful of tourists and just a few locals for years before the prohibition.

In any case, more traditional, local forms of "playing with bulls" such as the bous al carrer or correbous are not banned. These are annual festivities that take place in only a handful of towns in Southern Catalonia, and in many places in the Valencian Land. They involve different forms, for instance, bous a la plaça: releasing cows and bulls, one by one, into a makeshift, temporary bullring for exactly 5 minutes each, where people jump into the ring to challenge or "taunt" the cow or bull, risking their lives. Another form, bous al carrer, involves releasing a bull into the streets and running with it, often with ropes tied to its horns to control it (bou capllaçat). They do not involve stabbing or hurting the cow or bull, and do not end with it's death, although some parts of this tradition can involve placing balls of fire on the bulls horns (bou embolat), which can be considered animal cruelty.

=== Galicia and the Basque Country ===
Galician and Basque nationalists have also expressed abolitionist stances, although in the case of the latter this has been somewhat mooted by the conundrum of bullfighting being at the heart of the San Fermin festival in Pamplona.

Animal welfare concerns are perhaps the prime driver of opposition to bullfighting outside Spain, although rejection of traditionalism and Criollo elitism may also play a role in Latin America. In the Canary Islands, bullfights are banned but cock fights, banned in the rest of Spain, are popular, despite laws attempting to ban them.

=== General Animal Rights Activists, Pros and Cons of Bullfighting, etc ===
Animal rights activists claim bullfighting is a cruel or barbarous blood sport, in which the bull suffers severe stress and a slow, torturous death. A number of animal rights or animal welfare activist groups such as Antitauromaquia ("Antibullfighting") and StopOurShame undertake anti-bullfighting actions in Spain and other countries.

Other arguments in favor of bullfighting include those to the effect that the death of animals in slaughterhouses is often much worse than the death in the ring, and that both types of animal die for entertainment since humans do not need to consume meat, eating it instead for taste (bulls enter the food chain after the bullfight). The last common defense to the practice is the conservationist standpoint for both the tradition itself and the Bravo bull variety, as Bravo bulls are the closest living relative to the European wild bull, completely extinct now and divided into sub-breeds whose only use is provision of meat and milk, serving the food industry.

After years of increased pressure against bullfighting by abolitionist movements within Spain, the death of bullfighter Victor Barrio in July 2016 led to hundreds of comments being posted on various social media expressing joy towards the event and openly mocking his family and widow. This led to a significant backlash within Spain against anti-bullfighting activism, and criminal investigations are ongoing against those involved. Within a few days of Barrio's death, over 200,000 signatures had been collected demanding action be taken against one such activist.

Following the appointment of Ernest Urtasun as Spain's Minister of Culture, the Ministry has taken actions to hamper the sport. In September of 2024 Urtasun ordered the abolishment of the National Bullfighting Award, although the decision was noted as illegal due to a 2013 law, no bullfighting organization in Spain has taken actions to fight the decission.

== Special events ==
=== Professional ===
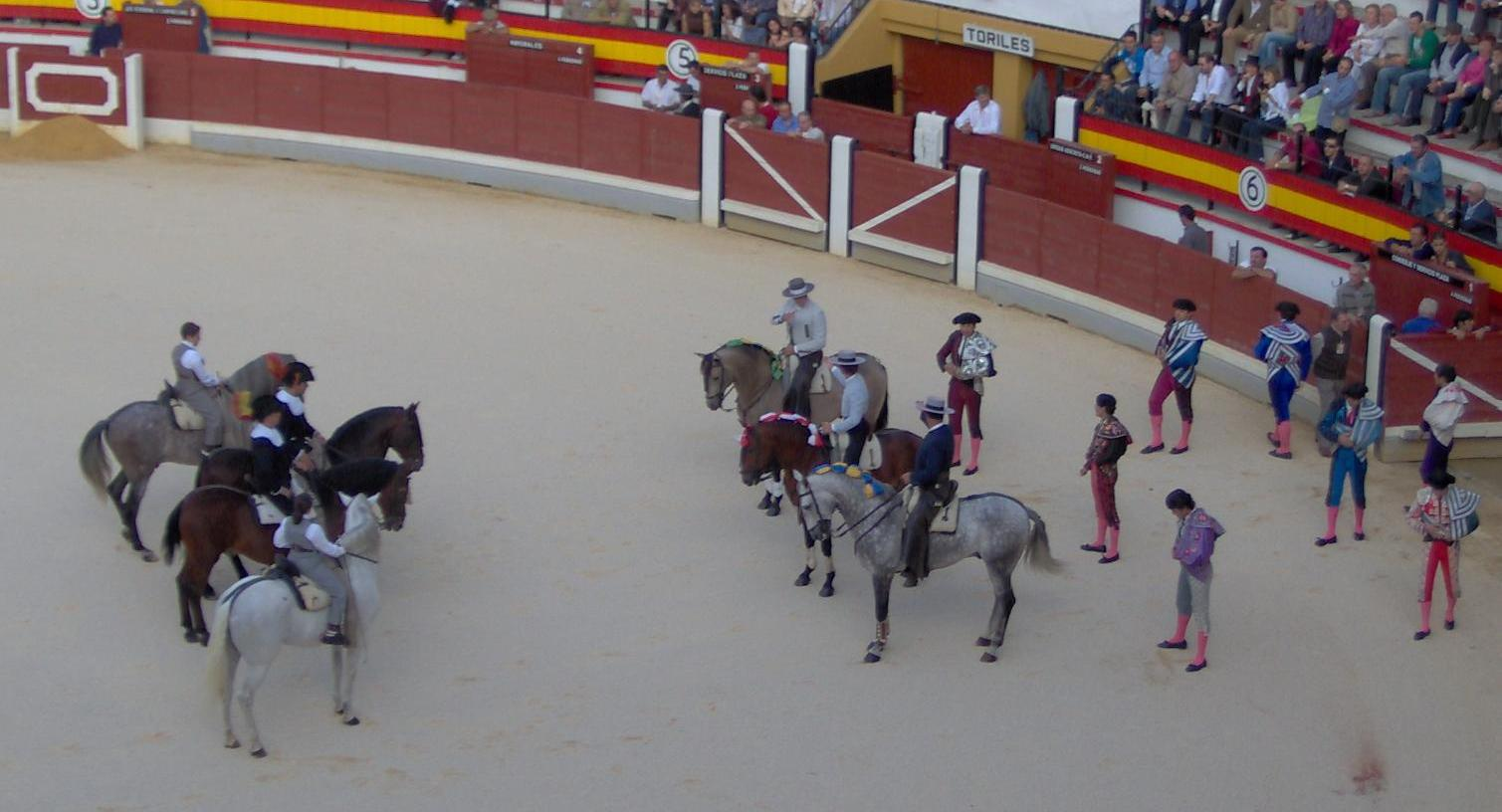
- Paseíllo in a corrida de rejones, 2005
  The rejoneo or corrida de rejones: A rejoneador (lancer) on horseback tries to stab the bull with javelins called rejones de castigo in the first stage and banderillas in the second. In the final stage, the rejoneador kills the bull with a rejón de muerte (lance of death). On some occasions, the rejoneador will kill the bull on foot in the traditional way with muleta and estoca.
- The recortes: A bullfighter dodges around the bull and does not use a cape or sword. Bulls are not killed during this type of bullfight. Most specialists in this form of bullfighting come from Aragon.
- Comedy spectacles, such as El bombero torero y los enanitos toreros ("The bullfighting fireman and the bullfighting dwarves").

=== Amateur ===
- The encierro: A "running" of the bulls through the streets. Customarily, runners run before the bulls to guide them from the pen to the plaza, where the bulls will await the afternoon's bullfight. The most famous is that of Pamplona in July, although encierros exist in towns throughout Spain. It is a dangerous activity, and care should be taken by those who wish to participate. In Segorbe, bulls are herded to the bullring by riders on horseback, an event called Entrada de toros y caballos, which is a tourist attraction.
- The bous al carrer (bulls at the street in Catalan) commonly found in Comunidad Valenciana and some places in Catalonia. The main difference from a encierro is that the bulls aren't directed to any bullring
  - A Mediterranean variation, called bous a la mar (bulls at the sea), takes place on a dock. The youths jump into the water when the cow has cornered them. One place famous for this festivity is Dénia
  - Another variation is the toro embolado ("fire bull"). This fiesta takes place at midnight. Balls of flammable material or actual fireworks are placed on the horns. The bull is set free on the street where young men dodge and run away from the charging animal
- The Toro de la Vega, now called Toro de la Peña: This traditionally would take place on the second Tuesday in September at Tordesillas. A bull would run through an open area and over a bridge across the Duero River. There a crowd (on foot and on horse) would try to kill the bull with spears and lances before it reaches the other side. In 2016 the government of Castile and León prohibited the killing or injuring of the bull during this event. However, the law of Castile and León dictates that all bulls used in events must be killed within 24 hours after its use. This means that the bull is no longer killed in public, but later, out of the audience's sight. Since the prohibition Toro de la Vega is replaced by Toro de la Peña, a bull run in which it is not allowed to injure or kill the bull.
- The vaquillas (sokamuturra in Basque): A young cow of fighting stock is freed in a small ring (often built for the period of the festival and then dismantled) among local youths who tease her. The cow may have a dangling rope for recovery purposes.

== Gallery ==
=== The phases of the Spanish-style bullfighting ===
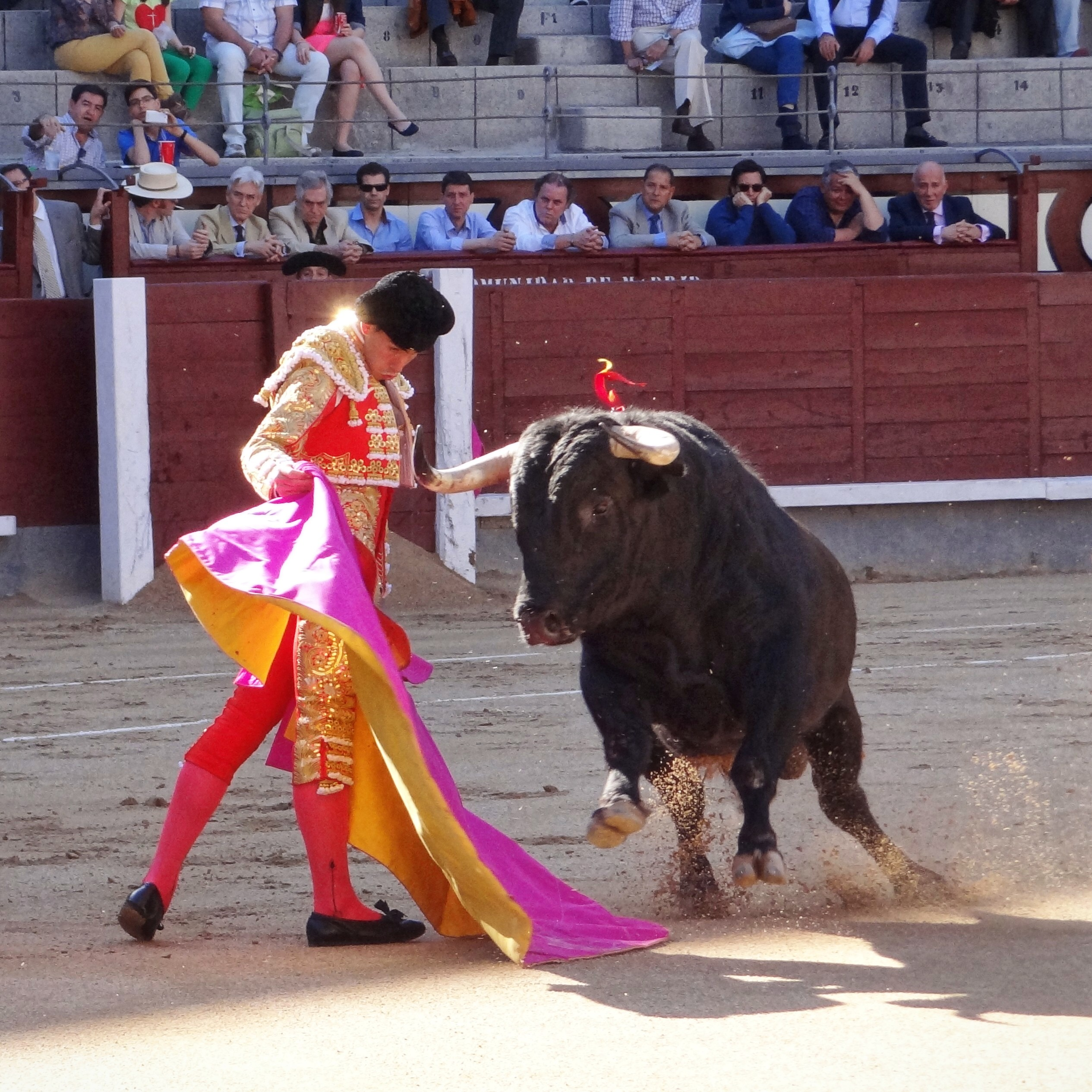
Tercio de varas: Suerte de capote

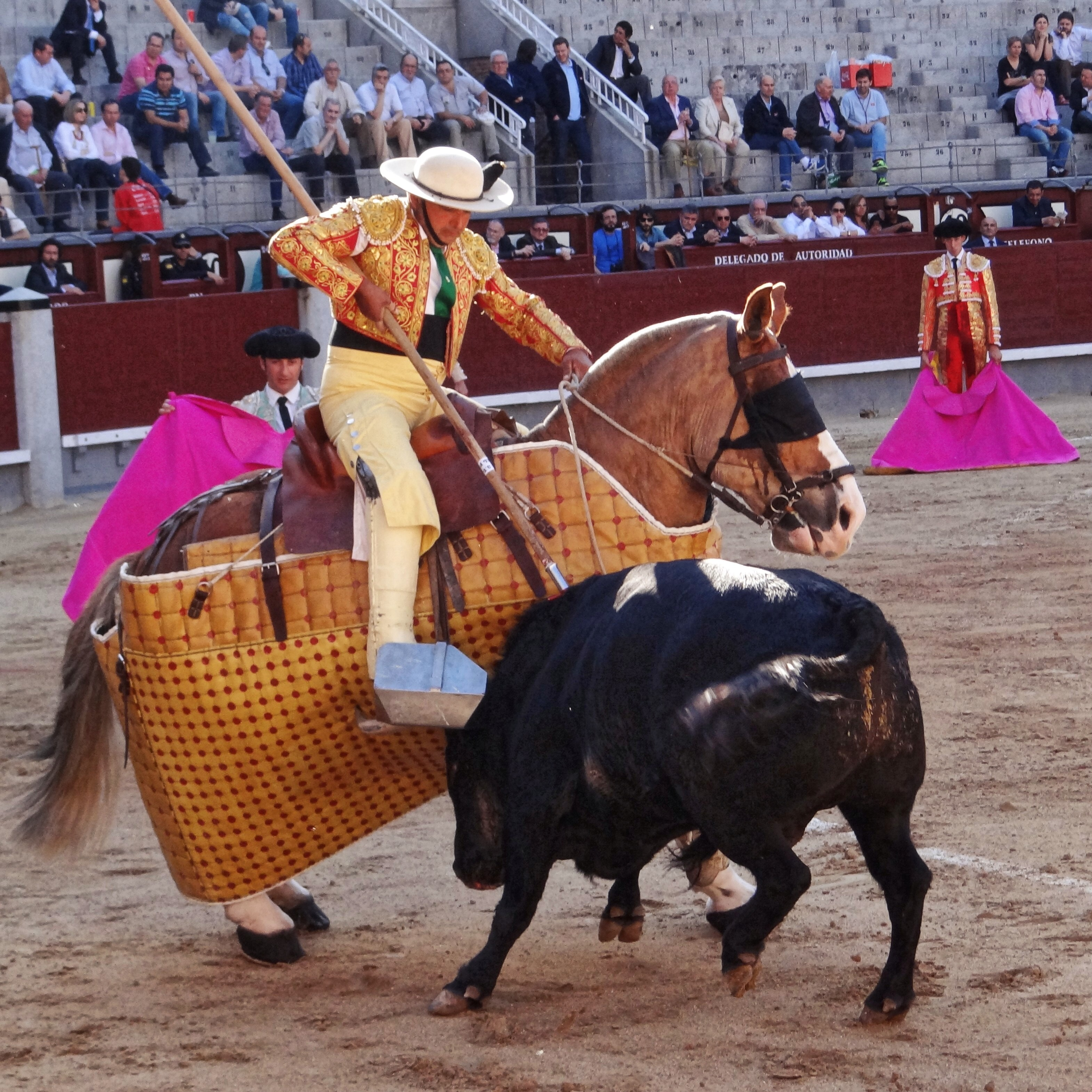
Tercio de varas: The picador on a caparisoned and blindfolded horse pierces the back of the bull with a spear.

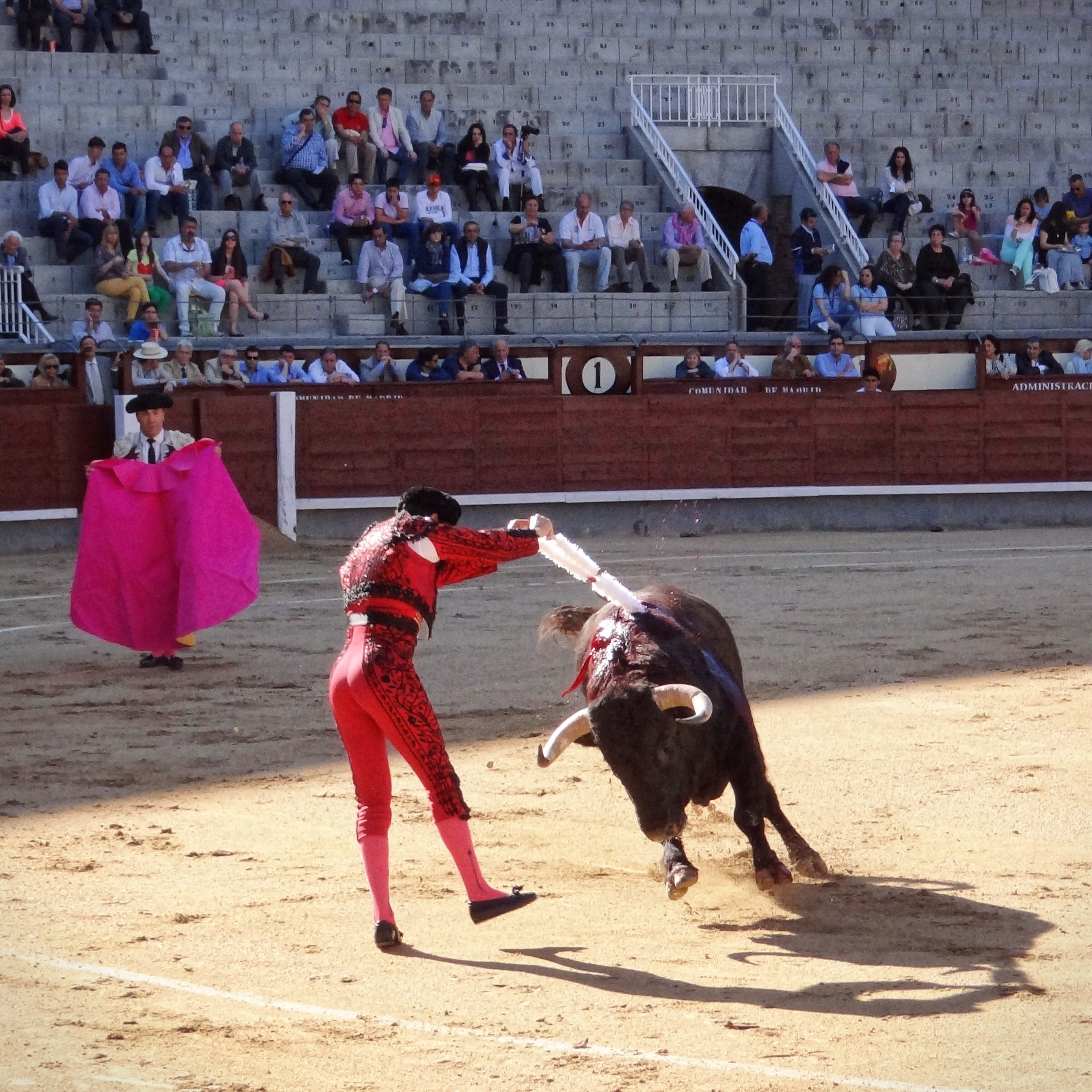
Tercio de banderillas: The banderillero stabs the banderillas into the bull's back.

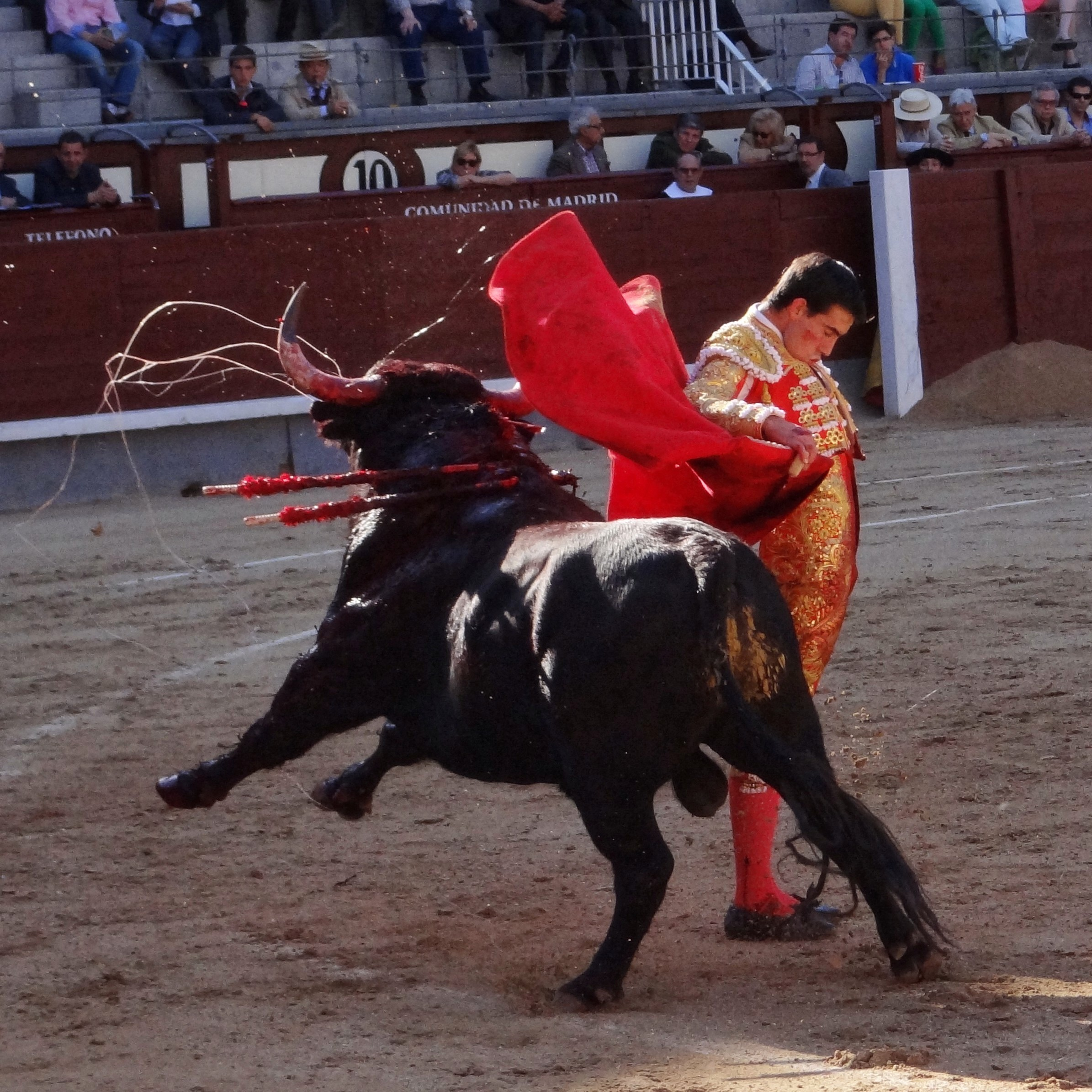
Tercio de muerte: Suerte de muleta

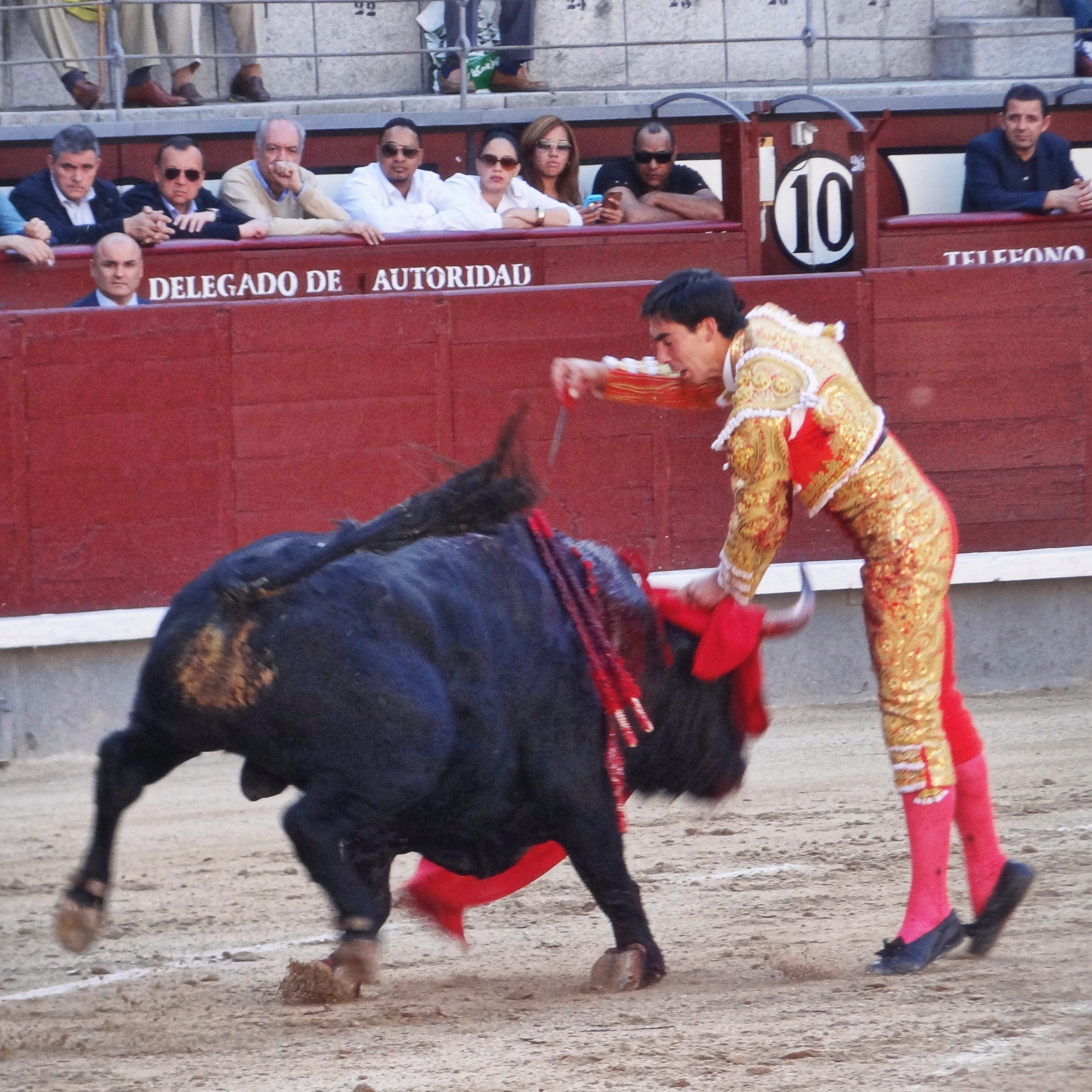
Tercio de muerte: The matador pierces the bull's heart with his sword.

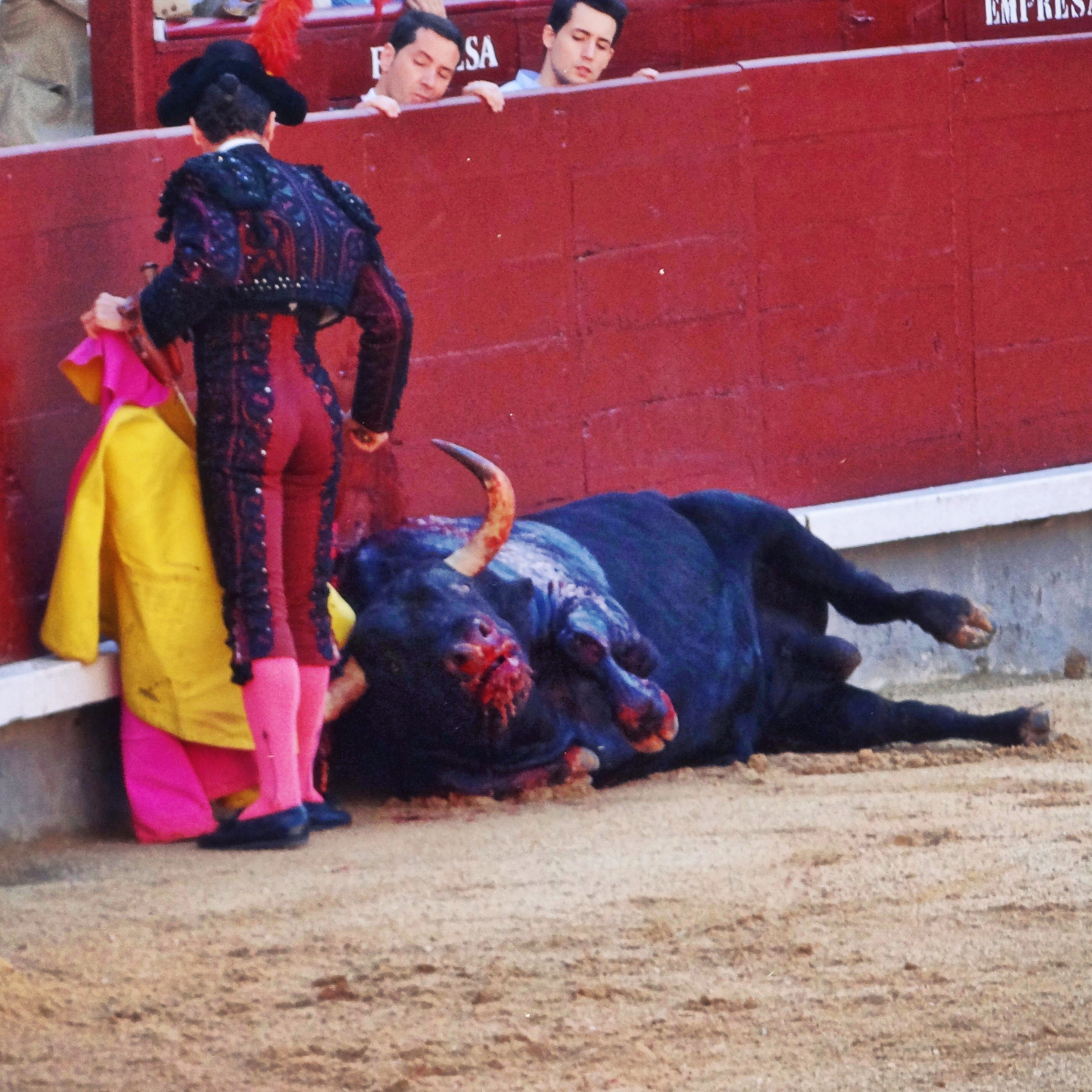
Tercio de muerte: The bull, fatally wounded, falls to the ground.

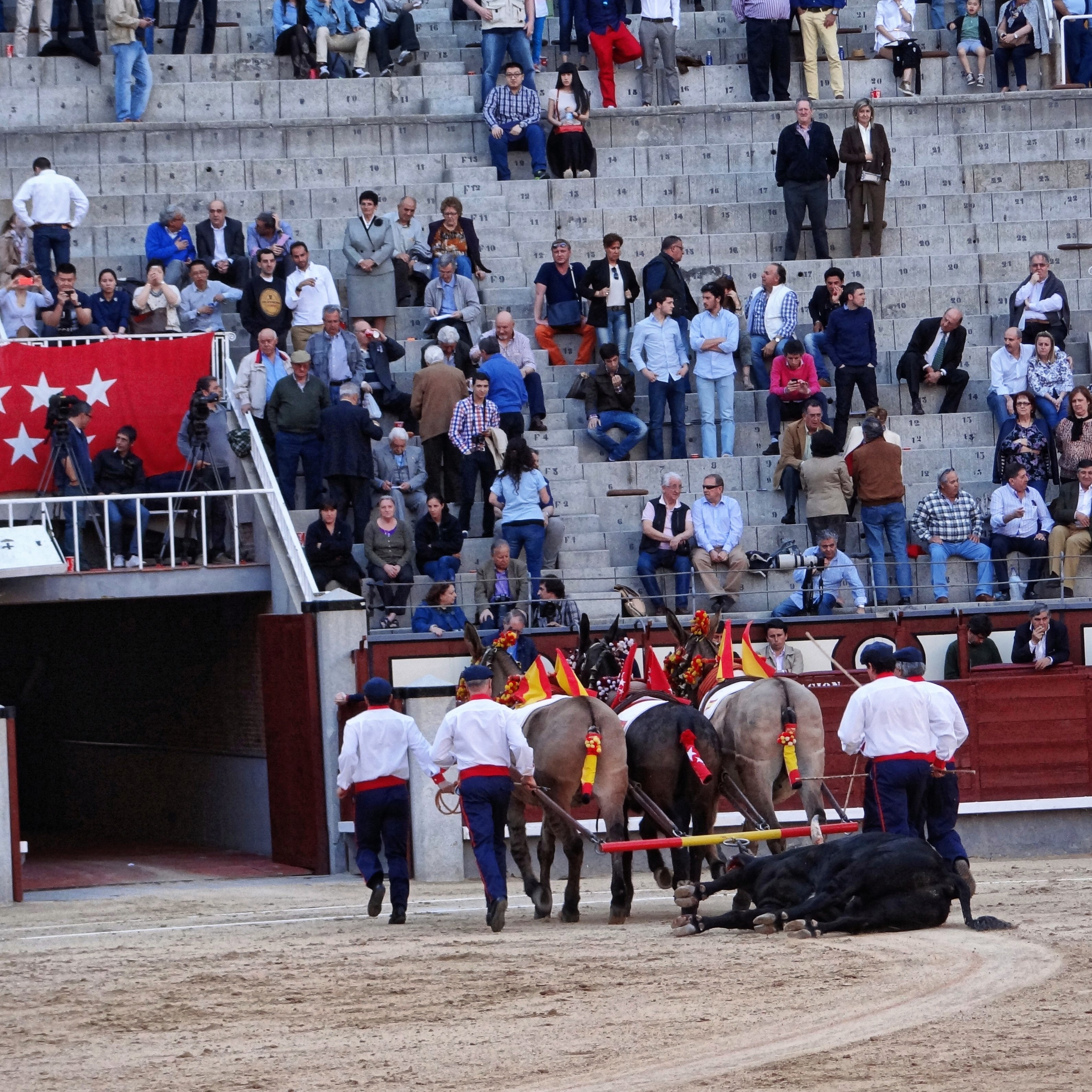
The dead bull is dragged away from the arena.

== See also ==
- Bullring
- Lamborghini: auto-manufacturer known for naming their cars after Spanish bulls
- Olé
- Portuguese-style bullfighting
