= Costillares =

Spanish bullfighter

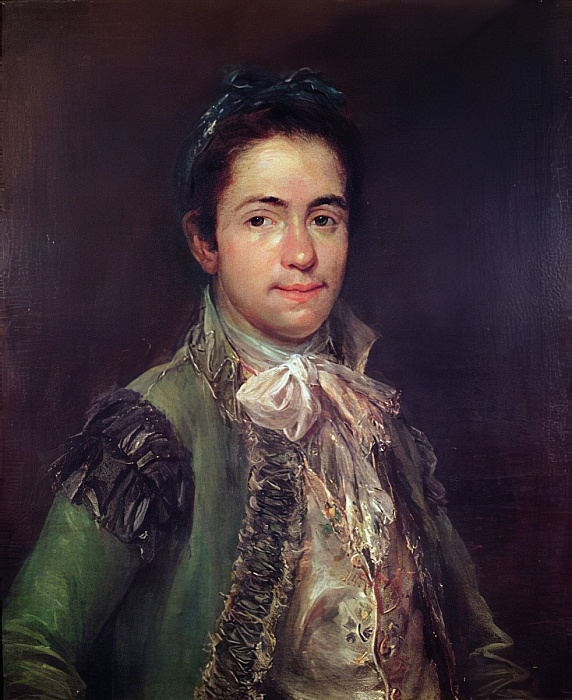

Joaquín Rodríguez (July 20, 1743 – January 27, 1800), better known as Costillares, was a Spanish bullfighter who has been considered the father of modern spectator bullfighting.

== Biography ==
Costillares was born in Seville, son of the matador Luis Rodríguez, who also worked in a slaughterhouse, and followed his father in both professions. He learned about the anatomy of the bull at the slaughterhouse, which would help him as a bullfighter. He began his career with Pedro Palomo, and gained recognition in Seville, where he among the first to perform to acclaim at the recently constructed Real Maestranza bullring. Costillares debuted in Madrid in 1767, and began a rivalry with the popular favorite Pedro Romero. He appeared regularly in Madrid between 1780 and 1790, surviving serious injury in a 1782 fight. He died in Madrid, aged 56.
