= Víctor Barrio =

Spanish bullfighter (1987–2016)

Personal information
- Born: Víctor Barrio Hernanz; 29 May 1987 Grajera, Segovia, Spain
- Died: 9 July 2016 (aged 29) Teruel, Spain
- Resting place: Sepúlveda, Segovia, Spain; 41°17′58″N 3°45′29″W
- Monuments: Plaque at Valdemorillo; Traditional tile at Teruel; Mosaic at Las Ventas
- Home town: Sepúlveda
- Occupation: Bullfighter
- Years active: 2008–2016
- Agent: José Galán "Josele"; Alberto García (apoderados)
- Height: 190 cm (6 ft 3 in)
- Spouse: Raquel Sanz
- Parents: Joaquín Barrio (father); Esther Hernanz (mother)
- Relative: Ruth Barrio (sister)
- Website: www.victorbarrio.es

Víctor Barrio Hernanz (Spanish: [ˈbiktoɾ ˈβarjo eɾˈnanθ]; 29 May 1987 – 9 July 2016), known as Víctor Barrio, was a Spanish bullfighter who died at the age of 29 when he was gored in the chest by a bull named Lorenzo at the Teruel bullring.

== Early life ==
Barrio's parents, who both survived him, were Joaquín Barrio and Esther Hernanz.

According to Barrio's first apoderado, José Galán ("Josele"), Barrio had no formal training in tauromachy. He learnt at local farms about the profession, and indeed, never stood before a bull until he was twenty years old. On the other hand, at least one source says that Barrio was an alumnus of the Escuela de Tauromaquia de "El Espinar" in Segovia.

== Bullfighting career ==
Barrio's first performance in public as a novillero (novice bullfighter who fights yearling bulls) without picadores was on 13 July 2008 at Las Ventas de Retamosa in the province of Toledo. He then had his début with picadores on 29 August of the next year at the Sepúlveda bullring in the province of Segovia. He got great recognition as a novillero, winning the prizes for the best novillero at the Feria de San Isidro ("Saint Isidore's Fair) in 2011, awarded at Bilbao and Santander, and also the Golden Potter (Villaseca de la Sagra), the Silver Frascuelo (Moralzarzal), and the Golden Spike (Calasparra).

Barrio took his alternativa at Madrid's Las Ventas bullring on 8 April 2012, which was Easter Sunday. Standing as "godfather" for the occasion was José Pedro Prados Martín "El Fundi", while Juan del Álamo bore witness. The bulls were supplied by the José Luis Pereda ranch. A minute of silence was observed for the fiftieth anniversary of bullfighter Juan Belmonte's death. In 2015, the Mesonero Mayor de Castilla and Golden Chimney of Valdemorillo trophies were awarded him.

There would seem to be no reliable record of Barrio ever having had his alternativa confirmed.

== Death ==
On 9 July 2016, during the Vaquilla del Ángel (literally "Angel's Heifer" — the angel is the city's patron, the Holy Guardian Angel) celebrations in Teruel, Barrio was on the bill together with Curro Vázquez and Morenito de Aranda. Barrio was 29 years old by this time. He was allotted the afternoon's third bull, a beast from the Los Maños ranch weighing 529 kg (1,166 lb; 83.3 st) named Lorenzo, who would be the last bull that Barrio ever faced. Lorenzo delivered a deadly goring to Barrio, thrusting a horn deep into the bullfighter's chest. Barrio died within minutes. Lorenzo's horn had passed through the bullfighter's axilla, penetrating his right lung and rupturing his thoracic aorta, leading to massive blood loss and a quick death. It was the first time in more than thirty years that a bullfighter had died during a corrida in Spain (excluding the banderilleros Manolo Montoliú and Ramón Soto Vargas, who died in 1992), the last before Barrio having been José Cubero Sánchez "el Yiyo" on 30 August 1985 at Colmenar Viejo, Madrid. The whole incident was broadcast live on television.

Barrio's body was brought to his hometown, and a chapel of rest (place where respects can be paid to one who has died) was set up at the local sports centre. Barrio's funeral in Sepúlveda, Segovia drew a great crowd, which included the authorities, bullfighters and aficionados.

After Barrio's death, many animal rights and anti-bullfighting advocates published messages that could have constituted crimes, leading the Fundación del Toro de Lidia ("Fighting Bull Foundation") and Víctor Barrio's family to take legal action against messages that they considered insulting and slanderous. A case in point was the complaint that Barrio's family brought against a teacher named Vicent Belenguer who had allegedly posted on his Facebook account that he wished the same fate (that is, death) on all Barrio's kin.

On 4 September 2016, a corrida was celebrated in homage to Barrio at the Valladolid bullring. Bulls were supplied by the Juan Pedro Domecq, Núñez del Cuvillo, Zalduendo, Domingo Hernández, and Victoriano del Río ranches, and were slain by Juan José Padilla, José Tomás, Morante de la Puebla, Julián López Escobar ("El Juli"), Manzanares hijo, and Alejandro Talavante.

In 2017, a plaque was unveiled at the Valdemorillo bullring, out through whose main gate Barrio had been borne, shoulder-high, as both a novillero and a matador. Also unveiled at the Teruel bullring was a tile in the bullfighter's honour decorated with a guardian angel's wings. In 2021, a ceramic mosaic homage to Barrio was unveiled at Las Ventas, right at the Great Gate. The artist was Luis Gordillo.

== Foundation ==
Also worth mentioning is the Fundación Víctor Barrio para la divulgación de la tauromaquia ("Víctor Barrio Foundation for the dissemination of tauromachy"), whose theme is a quote from Barrio himself:

La tauromaquia, más que defenderla, hay que enseñarla.
(Tauromachy, rather than be defended, needs to be taught.)

— Victor Barrio

== Lorenzo ==
Lorenzo died of injuries sustained during the fight, and there was widespread speculation that Lorenzo's mother, Lorenza, would be killed as part of the practice of "killing off the bloodline" whereby the families of "murderer bulls" would be killed. This was rendered moot as it was later confirmed by Lorenza's ranchers that she had been put to death days before the event because of her old age.

== See also ==
- Bullfighting in Spain
- Iván Fandiño, another Spanish bullfighter who was killed by a bull less than a year later.
