= José Mari Manzanares =

Spanish bullfighter (1953–2014)

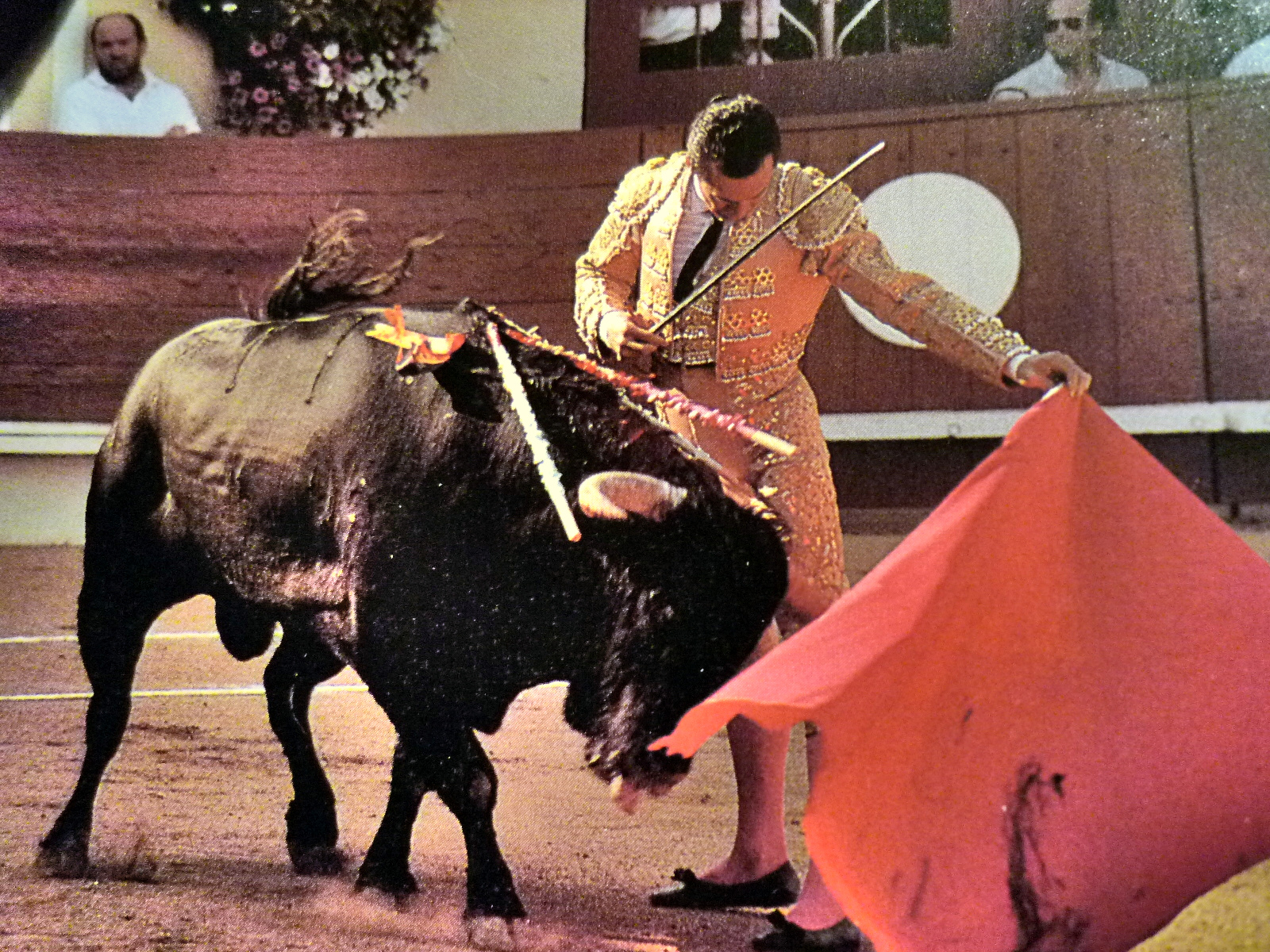
- Manzanares in 1994

Personal information
- Nationality: Spanish
- Born: José María Dols Abellán; 14 April 1953 Alicante, Spain
- Died: 28 October 2014 (aged 61) Campo Lugar, Spain
- Resting place: Nuestra Señora del Remedio Cemetery, Alicante
- Home town: Alicante
- Occupation: Bullfighter
- Years active: 1970–2006
- Agent: Lozano Dorado; Paco Dorado; Simón Casas; Enrique Patón (apoderados)
- Spouse: Resurrección Samper (m. 1977; div. 1994)
- Children: Ana María Dols Samper; Resurrección Dols Samper; José María Dols Samper; Manuel Dols Samper
- Parents: José María Dols y Cantó ("Pepe Dols") (father); María Abellán y Sánchez (mother)
- Relatives: Ana María Dols Abellán; Resurrección Dols Abellán; Manuel Dols Abellán (siblings)
- Other interests: Raising fighting bulls

José María Dols Abellán (Spanish: [xoˈse maˈɾia ˈðols aβeˈʎan]; 14 April 1953 – 28 October 2014), known professionally as José Mari Manzanares (Spanish: [xoˈse ˈmaɾi manθaˈnaɾes]) was a Spanish bullfighter, son of the banderillero Pepe Dols (Pepe Manzanares) and father of José María Dols Samper, likewise a bullfighter.

== Early life ==
Manzanares was born in Alicante's Santa Cruz neighbourhood. He went to school in the city of his birth, where he also worked as a child at a warehouse. His parents were José María Dols y Cantó, a banderillero and worker at the Port of Alicante, and María Abellán y Sánchez.

While still very young, Manzanares learnt the basics of bullfighting not only from his father, but also from some early experiences at the bullring and some training.

== Bullfighting career ==
Manzanares donned the suit of lights – this one in white and silver – for the first time in Andújar in 1969, facing together with Nelson Vilegas yearling bulls bearing the Francisco Sánchez brand. He had fought at 15 such engagements before he made his début with picadores on 24 May 1970 in Benidorm, alternating with Curro Fuentes and José Luis Ortuño against yearlings supplied by the Sánchez Arjona ranch. He fought in 42 novilladas (novice bullfights with yearling bulls) this season. On 16 June 1971, alternating with Juan Carlos Castro "Luguillano" and Jose Luis Feria "Galloso", he presented himself for the first time at Las Ventas in Madrid, cutting two ears on that occasion from yearling bulls supplied by Carlos Núñez, and was also borne shoulder-high out through the Great Gate.

Manzanares took his alternativa at Alicante on 24 June 1971 (Saint John's Day), with Luis Miguel Dominguín standing as his "godfather" and Santiago Martín "El Viti" as the witness. On this afternoon, Manzanares cut the tail from a bull that he had slain, supplied by the Atanasio Fernández ranch. He saw 19 novilladas and 25 corridas that season, but no more than that because of his military service obligations.

His début at the Maestranza in Seville came on 10 April 1972. This same year, his alternativa was confirmed in Madrid. Standing as "godfather" this time was Palomo Linares, while Eloy Cavazos stood as witness.

Thereafter, Manzanares's long career as a matador was marked by highs and lows, from his great triumphs in Madrid in the late 1970s when he was always at the top of the escalafón taurino (bullfighters' rankings) until he announced what would turn out to a short retirement in 1989.

Manzanares was the bullfighter to have fought the most bulls in the 20th century, with the number surpassing 1,700 corridas in 1997, and he may also have been the bullfighter to have fought the most bulls ever in tauromachy's history, but this is unclear, given the inexact data and statistics from bygone centuries.

Manzanares's apoderados (agents/managers) were the brothers Lozano and Paco Dorado, and the businessmen Simón Casas and Enrique Patón. He withdrew from the bullring on 1 May 2006, announcing his retirement at the Maestranza that day.

Manzanares's elegant and orthodox style has always been considered one of bullfighting's most classic; he was especially acknowledged for the style of his chest passes. At least two writers have hailed him as torero de toreros ("bullfighter of bullfighters"). His bullfighter son, José María Dols Samper, was the one who cut off his coleta (bullfighter's queue) on the occasion of his retirement. The rejoneador Manolo Dols Samper "Manolo Manzanares" is also his son.

== Personal life and death ==
Manzanares wed Resurrección Samper (known as "Yeyes") at Alicante's Monastery of the Holy Face on 5 February 1977. Their children were not only José María, but also his siblings Ana María, Resurrección (also known as "Yeyes"), and Manuel. Manzanares and his wife ended their marriage in 1994.

Manzanares died at the age of 61 of natural causes at his bull-raising farm, Cerro Teresa, in Campo Lugar, Cáceres on 28 October 2014. His death was unexpected. His bullfighter son, likewise known as José María Manzanares, had only just then arrived in Mexico for a series of bullfighting engagements in Latin America when he got the news. He quickly came back to Spain. The elder Manzanares was buried at the family pantheon at the Alicante Cemetery.

Three years after Manzanares's death, on 11 November 2017, his four children donated the royal blue and gold suit of lights that their father had worn during the last three seasons of his bullfighting career to the Real, Ilustre y Fervorosa Hermandad y Cofradía de Nazarenos de Nuestra Señora del Santo Rosario, Nuestro Padre Jesús de la Sentencia y María Santísima de la Esperanza Macarena (the Hermandad de la Macarena for short), a Catholic brotherhood whose seat is at the Basílica de la Macarena in Seville. Manzanares had been fervently devoted to the brotherhood's icon at this church, the Virgin of Hope of Macarena.
