= Iván Fandiño =

Spanish bullfighter (1980–2017)

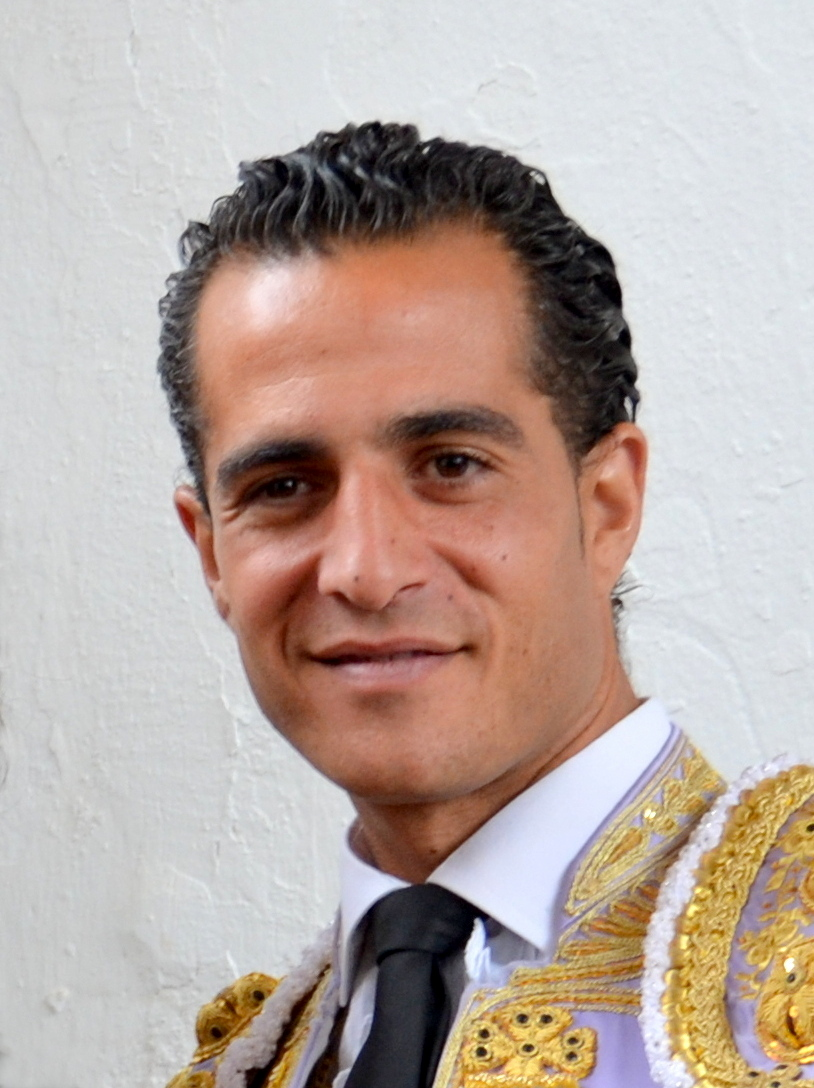
- Fandiño in Brihuega in 2014

Personal information
- Nicknames: El Niño de la Antigua (dropped 2003)
- Nationality: Spanish
- Born: Iván Fandiño Barros; 29 September 1980 Orduña, Biscay, Spain
- Died: 17 June 2017 (aged 36) Mont-de-Marsan, Landes, France
- Monument(s): Orduña bullring Vista Alegre bullring, Bilbao; Aire-sur-l'Adour bullring
- Home town: Orduña, Biscay, Spain
- Occupation: Bullfighter
- Years active: 2002–2017
- Agent: Néstor García (apoderado)
- Spouse: Cayetana García Barona
- Children: 1 (daughter Mara)
- Parents: Paco Fandiño (father); Txaro (mother)

Iván Fandiño Barros (Spanish: [iˈβan fanˈdiɲo ˈβaros]; 29 September 1980 – 17 June 2017) was a Spanish bullfighter. He died when a bull named Provechito gored him during a bullfight at the bullring in Aire-sur-l'Adour in the south of France, only 343 days after fellow Spanish bullfighter Víctor Barrio had met the same fate.

== Early life ==
Fandiño was born in Orduña, Biscay on 29 September 1980 to parents whose roots lay in A Coruña. Although there was no bullfighting background in his family, he became interested in bullfighting at the age of 14 after standing out as a pelota player in his youth.

Fandiño first donned the suit of lights in Laudio, Álava on 16 August 1999, in an appearance at which he alternated with José Manuel Sánchez, fighting young bulls supplied by the Miguel Zaballos ranch.

After Fandiño's short time at the Vitoria and Valencia bullfighting schools in Bilbao – both went out of business twenty days after he joined – during the 2000 and 2001 bullfighting seasons he shared bullfighting instruction alongside bullfighters Raúl Gracia, El Tato, Antonio Ferrera, and Juan José Padilla, on the banks of the mouth of the River Guadalquivir, in Sanlúcar de Barrameda. At first announced by the nickname El Niño de la Antigua, Fandiño later chose to drop this nickname in 2003.

== Bullfighting career ==
He had his début with picadores on 2 June 2002 in Orduña, with yearling bulls supplied by the Salamancan Javier Pérez Tabernero ranch, and with Fandiño sharing the billing with Julien Lescarret and Iker Javier Lara, cutting three ears at this event. He ended this difficult season with two further appearances.

In the 2003 bullfighting season, Fandiño took part in seven novilladas in which he reaped eleven appendages (ears or perhaps tails). On the afternoon of 28 September he performed at Moralzarzal, where after cutting an ear from each of his young bulls from the La Guadamilla ranch, he was proclaimed the champion of the Madrid novillero cycle. The 2004 bullfighting season brought Fandiño his baptism in blood: a bull calf bearing the Madrazo brand gored him in Balmaseda on 17 July, but it was deemed to be only a minor goring. He was certainly healed enough by the time of the important ceremony in the capital a few months later.

When Fandiño was a novillero. In the Province of Guadalajara, he met Néstor García, his agent-manager. On 12 September 2004, Fandiño cut one of his ears at a bullfighting event.

Following the difficult start to the 2005 bullfighting season, in which he fought ten bullfights in top-class arenas in, among other cities, Madrid and Barcelona, Fandiño took his alternativa on 25 August 2005, once again finding himself at Bilbao's Vista Alegre bullring for this occasion. Standing as "godfather" was Julián López Escobar "El Juli", while Salvador Vega García bore witness. The bull used in the ceremony was Afrodisíaco, a chestnut beast weighing 517 kg from the new El Ventorrillo ranch.

Even though he participated in two other bullfights, in the 2006 campaign Fandiño made 18 paseíllos in which he cut 27 ears. Although he did not take trophies in the Illumbe bullrings in San Sebastián (20 August) and Vistalegre in Bilbao (26 August), the bullfighter from Biscay left the imprint of his well-rounded concept of bullfighting, consolidated craft and important technical advances against bulls from the Victorino Martín and La Quinta ranches, respectively. Nevertheless, the third bull of the La Quinta bullfight gored him eight centimetres deep in his rectal area at the Bilbao bullring.

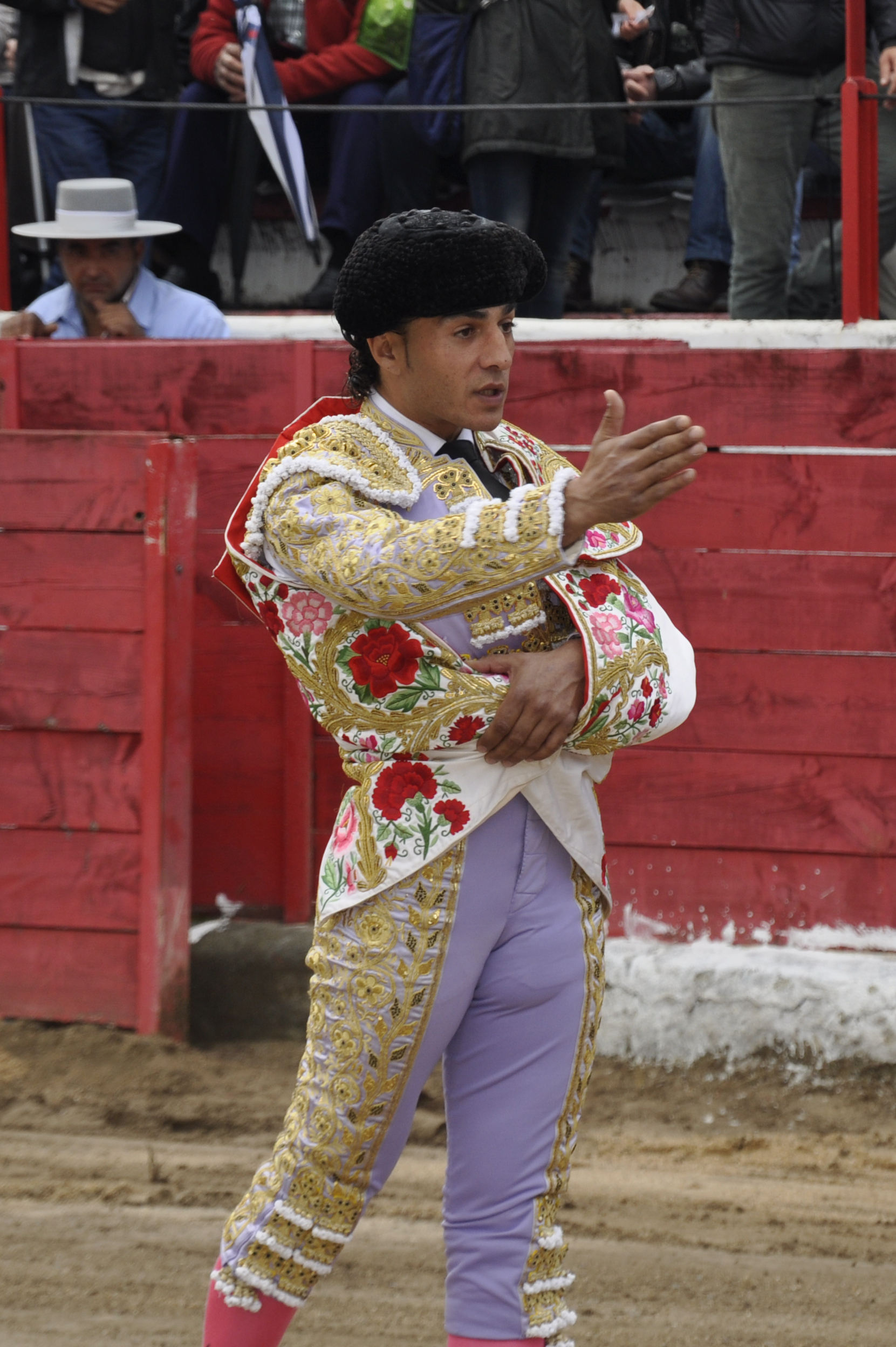
Fandiño at the Orduña festivities in 2012

Even if Fandiño lost a significant number of victories because of his irregular handling of the sword, he nonetheless received the award for the best estocada (the sword thrust meant to kill the bull) of the Alcalá de Henares fair in 2006.

Fandiño had his alternativa confirmed at Las Ventas on 12 May 2009. Standing as "godfather" this time was Antonio Ferrera, while the witness was Morenito de Aranda. The bull used for the occasion was Catalán, a chestnut-coloured beast weighing 545 kg from the La Dehesilla ranch. The bullfighter, now confirmed as a matador, received an ovation for his artistry in the bullfight. He wore a violet and gold suit of lights.

On 13 April 2010, Fandiño presented himself at the Maestranza in Seville to fight bulls at the Seville Fair, which were supplied by the Portuguese bull ranch Palha. He alternated with Arturo Macías and Serafín Marín and ended the bullfighting season having fought in 32 corridas.

The year 2011 saw Fandiño launched into bullfighting stardom after four great appearances at the Las Ventas bullring in Madrid, at which he earned as many bull's ears, and which made him not only the champion of the Feria de San Isidro ("Saint Isidore's Fair" — a yearly event at Las Ventas) but also the season champion. Even though he was badly gored by a bull at the Malagueta bullring in Málaga on 20 August, he ended the season at the top of the escalafón taurino (bullfighters' rankings).

Fandiño's rise continued in 2012, when after a tour through Latin America with daily triumphs, his Spanish campaign opened with the bullfighter being borne out through the Great Gate at the Feria taurina de San José (Saint Joseph's Bullfighting Fair, also called the Feria de Fallas) at the Valencia bullring, and triumphal afternoons also came his way in Seville and Madrid, where he was awarded ears from each bull. In only a month, he fought two corridas as the lone bullfighter, one in Bilbao and the other in Valencia, cut two ears in Bilbao's Corridas Generales, and repeated his success in Madrid with a great appearance at the Autumn Fair, which, together with his triumphs in the southwest of France, were enough to make him bullfighter of the year after he was borne shoulder-high out of the Dax, Bayonne, and Joseph-Fourniol (Vic-Fezensac) bullrings. The Great Gates at Arles, Salamanca, Guadalajara, Pontevedra, and Toledo, along with the Latin American ones at Medellín, Lima, and Cali rounded out a golden year, which culminated with the Golden Ear, awarded by Radio Nacional de España to the season's champion.

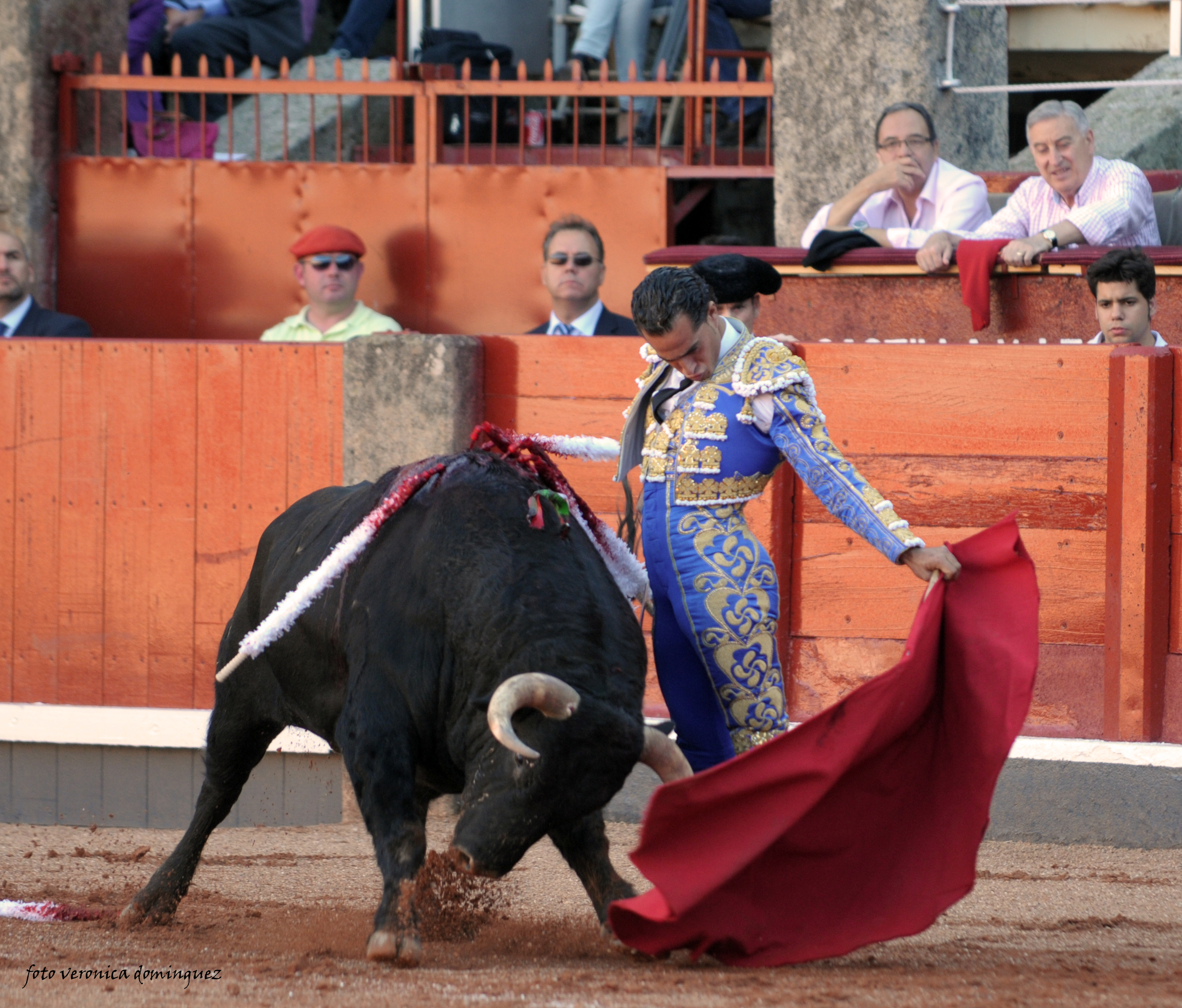
Salamanca, 2013

Now ensconced among the élite, Fandiño opened the 2013 bullfighting season with New World successes in Lima (Peru), Cali, Medellín, Duitama (Colombia), Mérida, and San Cristóbal (Venezuela), and with a triumphant ear-cutting at each of Castellón de la Plana and Valencia. He was also champion at the Easter Fair in Arles, but was badly wounded in Madrid in the first of three appearances that he was to have made, by a bull from the Portuguese bull ranch Parladé. He had nevertheless performed the best faena (series of passes before the bullfighter slays the bull) at the Feria de San Isidro before his bull injured him. Fandiño returned to the bullrings only after a month of convalescence, and almost at once became the champion of the well-known Festival of San Fermín, as well as reaping five ears from bulls, after triumphant appearances, at Mont-de-Marsan. He became season champion in France, with a bullfight in Bayonne before six bulls from the Fuente Ymbro ranch standing out. One of the season's other highlights was Fandiño's fight in Bilbao with a fierce bull from the Jandilla ranch, and there were further outstanding successes at Arles, Santander, Cáceres, Salamanca, Burgos, Palencia, Pontevedra, Cuenca, Almería, Ciudad Real, and Zaragoza. He was also part of the bullfighting team for the Press Bullfight at the Murcia September Fair, where he cut one ear. For the second year in a row, Radio Nacional de España awarded him the Golden Ear as the year's foremost bullfighter.

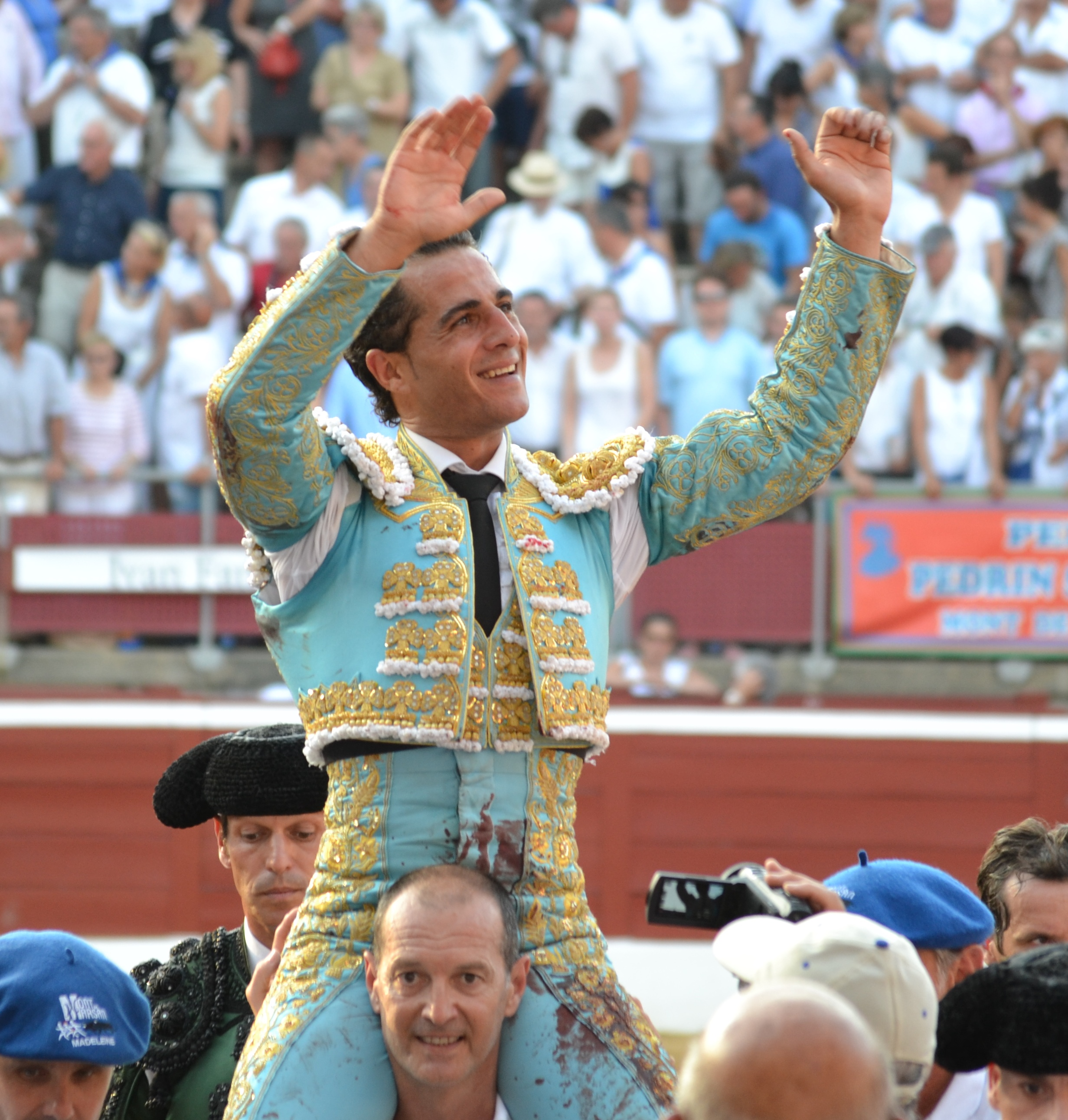
Being borne out on shoulders in Bayonne after slaying six bulls, July 2014.

After an intense campaign in the New World, the 2014 bullfighting season began for Fandiño in Valencia, once again during the Feria taurina de San José, where he scored a great triumph, and after appearing on two April afternoons at the Seville Fair. On 13 May, the Great Gate at Las Ventas was swung open for him after he had reaped two ears at a corrida with bulls from the Parladé ranch during the Feria de San Isidro. This appearance was a milestone in the season, as Fandiño came into the bullfighting ground to slay the afternoon's fifth bull (the second bull allotted to him) without his muleta, and literally took the bull by the horns. He returned to Madrid for the traditional Corrida de Beneficencia ("Charitable Bullfight"), where he reaped one more ear. This year, 2014, was a triumphal campaign for the bullfighter from Orduña, who ended the season with more than 60 bullfighting engagements and outstanding triumphs at Pamplona, where he cut four ears and was hailed as champion for the second consecutive year, Soria, Mont-de-Marsan, Bayonne, Palencia, Ciudad Real, Guadalajara, A Coruña, Talavera de la Reina, Valladolid, Linares, and Alicante among others. After finishing this campaign, Fandiño wed the Ecuadorian Cayetana García Barona on 18 October, Campo Bravo bull breeder Luis Fernando García's daughter, in Riobamba, Ecuador. This union resulted in a daughter named Mara.

Fandiño began his 2015 bullfighting campaign with a great challenge, locking himself in with six bulls from legendary ranches at the Las Ventas bullring in Madrid. The chosen day was 29 March, well before the yearly Fair and without season ticket support. Nevertheless, this did not get in the way of their having to hang up the "There Are No Tickets" signs, nor of there being a great deal of expectation generated. The bullfighter's inability to succeed at this gamble, though, took its toll on him and although he triumphed at Bayonne, Pamplona, Guadalajara, Béziers, and Palencia and, above all, in the triumph of the mano a mano (Note: A mano a mano is a bullfighting event at which there are only two bullfighters on the bill rather than the usual three.) with Enrique Ponce in Mont-de-Marsan, the number of contracts that he was awarded dwindled, even though he kept up a prominent presence on the bullfighting scene.

Fandiño's 2016 season was going the same way until in Bilbao, during the city's Aste Nagusia ("Great Week" in Basque) festival, he "immortalized" Lagunero, a bull from the Jandilla ranch, in a memorable faena. His winning streak continued in Dax and Guadalajara until he fell, injured, at Úbeda. He nonetheless showed up at Zaragoza a few days later, only to be gored by a bull once again, this time seriously.

In the 2017 bullfighting season, Fandiño kept rising to an ever higher position, and after triumphing in Guadalajara, he saw the Great Gate at Arles, where he would end up being designated the season's champion, swung open for him. After a brilliant run at the Feria de San Isidro, and at Ambato, Plasencia , and Inca, all indications were that he would once again recover his positions of privilege.

This, however, was not to be. His appearance at Inca would mark the last time when he was borne shoulder-high out of a bullring's main gate.

== Death ==
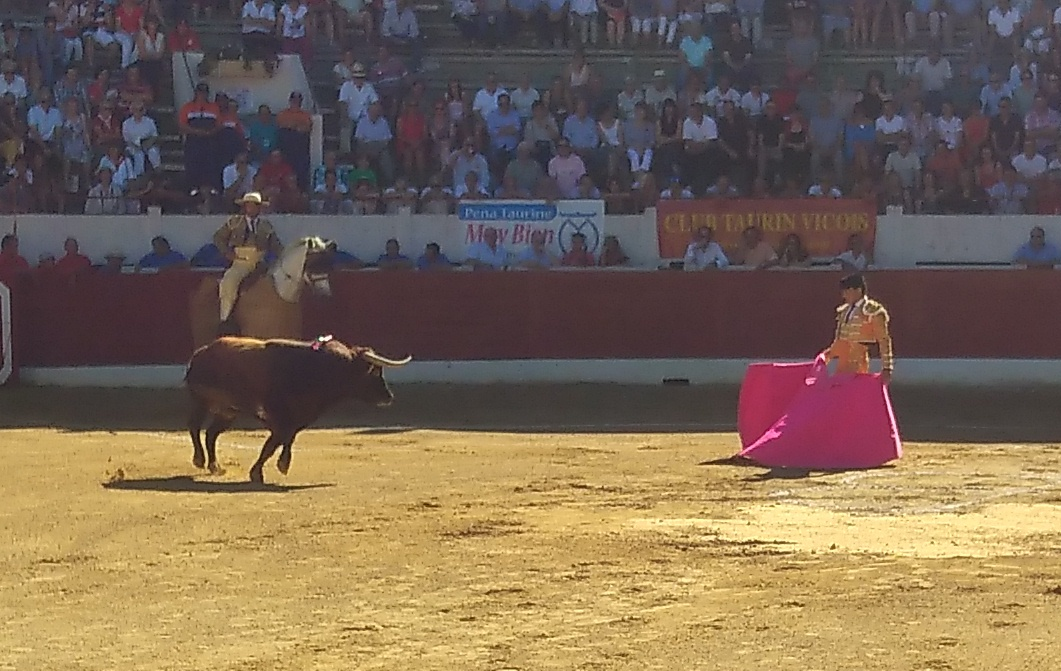
Fandiño in Aire-sur-l'Adour on 17 June 2017, shortly before the incident that killed him

On 17 June 2017, at the Arènes Maurice-Lauche in the French town of Aire-sur-l'Adour in the department of Landes, when Fandiño was 36 years old, a bull named Provechito (at least one source renders it "Aprovechito") from the Baltasar Ibán ranch in Spain, thwarted Fandiño's rise back to true stardom. During this corrida, held on the occasion of the town's festival, he wanted to execute a series of chicuelinas, (Note: The chicuelina is a bullfighting move performed with the cape by calling the bull from the front, holding the cape with both arms open, semi-extended. When the bull charges, the bullfighter turns half a turn on himself in the opposite direction to the bull's charge, in such a way that his body is wrapped in the cape, with the bull passing by on one side. This is named after the bullfighter Manuel Jiménez (1902-1967), nicknamed Chicuelo, who performed it for the first time at the Valencia bullring in 1924.) but Provechito caught him and threw him to the ground, where he gave the bullfighter a serious goring that affected his liver, lung, and kidney, severing the inferior vena cava and causing serious haemorrhaging. According to some British reports, Fandiño had tripped on his cape, and perhaps even fallen, leaving him vulnerable to the goring. After being attended at the bullring's own infirmary, when the injury's seriousness became quite obvious, Fandiño was transferred to the Hôpital Layné in Mont-de-Marsan, where he died of another cardiac arrest. The doctors who treated him could only certify his death. Indeed, according to one report, Fandiño was actually pronounced dead in the ambulance during the transfer to the Hôpital Layné.

Fandiño was only the second Spanish bullfighter to die by being gored by a bull in the 21st century, after Víctor Barrio had been killed on 9 July 2016 at Teruel.

Fandiño's body was driven overnight from Mont-de-Marsan to a funeral home in Amurrio, Álava. There, tributes in the shape of funerary wreaths from those in the bullfighting world wishing to express their condolences began to arrive in considerable numbers. Among bullfighters who sent wreaths were Enrique Ponce, Sebastián Castella, and Diego Urdiales. The king and queen, too, expressed their condolences. Fandiño's family considered the big one signed by Víctor Barrio's family to be "very special". Fandiño's remains were cremated in Laudio on 19 June 2017, only two days after his death, and a funeral was conducted in the bullfighter's birthplace, Orduña. This was well attended by both locals and luminaries from the bullfighting world who came to say their last goodbyes. The local church, Saint Mary's (iglesia de Santa María), was quite crowded for the ceremony.

Perhaps foreseeing the worst outcome, Fandiño apparently wrote a goodbye letter to those close to him. He wrote it on 15 May 2015, about two years before his fateful encounter with Provechito, and kept it in a suitcase that only he used. It was not found until his widow Cayetana was doing some housecleaning about two months after his death, and came upon her late husband's old piece of luggage. "Surely if you are reading this, it will all be over," begins the letter. Fandiño continued with "The price that I have had to pay is probably too hard, but my soul is at peace," and then warned "Tomorrow is not guaranteed anybody." (Note: The original Spanish text of these three segments reads: Seguramente si estáis leyendo esto, todo habrá acabado...Probablemente, el precio que me ha tocado pagar es demasiado duro, pero mi alma está tranquila...El mañana no le está asegurado a nadie.) Needless to say, the letter's appearance was a very emotional event for everybody involved. Fandiño had chosen this way to bid farewell to his parents, his sister, his apoderado (who was the one to make this story public in an interview), and of course his wife and young daughter, who was not quite two when her father died.

== Monuments ==
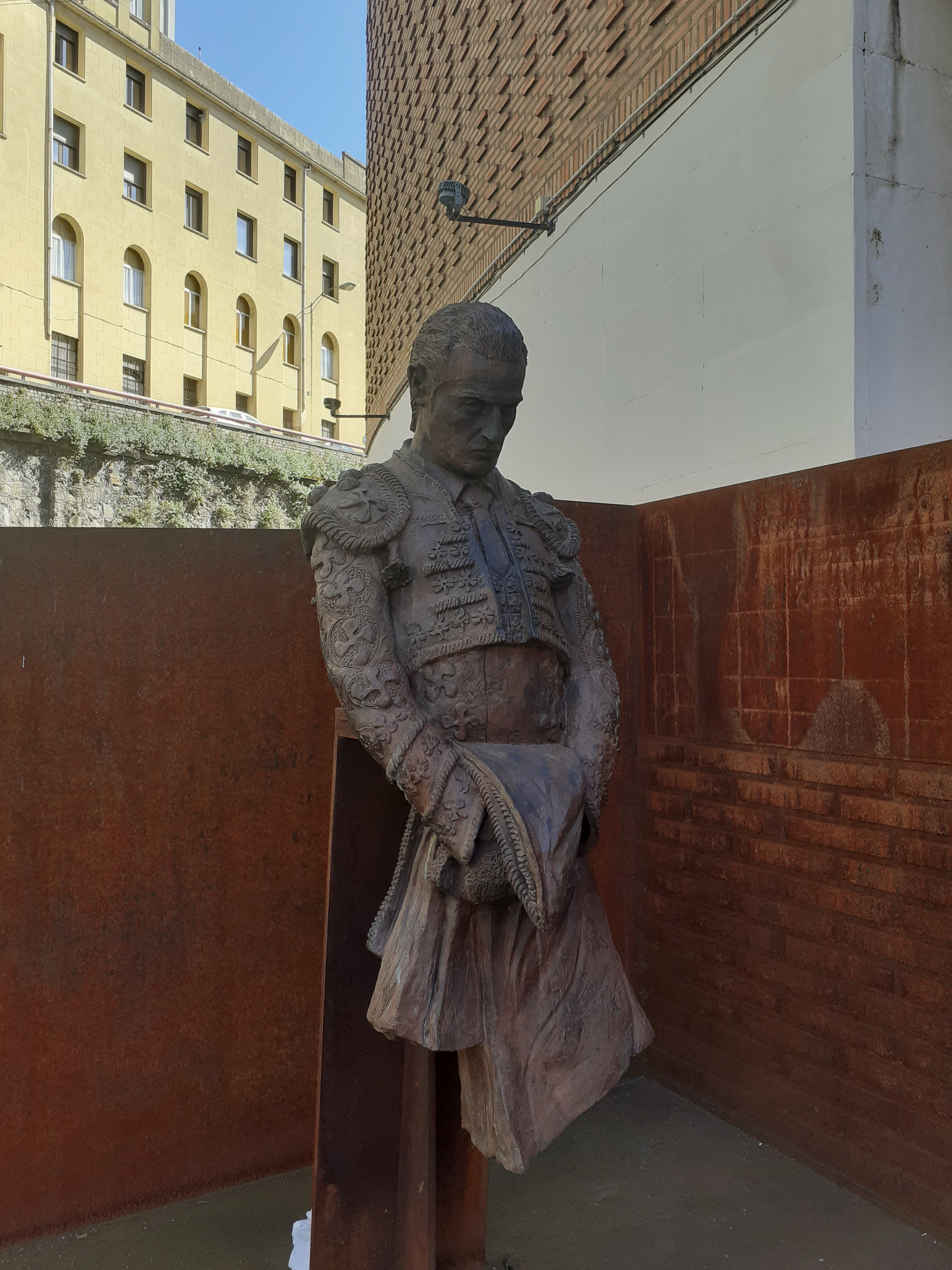
The monument in Bilbao.

In May 2018, during the commemorative week for the bullfighter, a bust of Fandiño was unveiled in recognition of his career and life. The monument stands just outside the Orduña bullring, in Fandiño's hometown. Sergio del Amo was the sculptor from whom the work was commissioned. Homages in Fandiño's memory were rounded out with a bullfighting festival whose participants included Enrique Ponce, Curro Díaz, El Fandi, Iván Abásolo, the novillero José Rojo, and the rejoneador Diego Ventura.

Shortly after this homage had been paid in Orduña, Bilbao unveiled another monument dedicated to the bullfighter on 19 August 2018. The sculptural set is sculptor Jesús Lizaso's work, and it can be found at the entrance to the Vista Alegre bullring in Bilbao. It was executed in steel; on one of the walls that represent a fronton court, (Note: A fronton court is a playing surface with walls for the Basque game of pelota, much enjoyed, and well played, by Fandiño as a youngster.) the bullfighter's engraved name can be read. On hand for the unveiling were kin, authorities, and people from the bullfighting world, as well as representatives of Basque pelota, a sport of which Fandiño was a fan.

Unveiled on 29 September 2019 – which would have been Fandiño's 39th birthday – at the entrance to the Arènes Maurice-Lauche bullring in Aire-sur-l'Adour, the scene of the bullfighter's death, was yet another monument in his memory. Like the one in Orduña, this one was Sergio del Amo's work. It was a project of the French Board of Bullfighting Clubs and was funded by popular subscription.

== Prizes and awards ==
- 2018
  - "Manolete Trophy" awarded posthumously.
  - Guadalajara establishes the "Iván Fandiño Prize".
- 2017
  - Trophy for Season Champion at Arles 2017, awarded by the Bullfighting Commission.
  - Popular Guadalajara. Nueva Alcarria 2017.
  - Golden Ear 2017 from Radio Nacional de España, awarded posthumously.
- 2016
  - Best faena at the Feria de Tafalla 2016. Tafallés Bullfighting Club.
- 2015
  - XXIV Virgin of the Macarena Trophy to the Champion of the Feria de Medellín.
  - Prize for the best faena in the Peña Alcarreña group.
- 2014
  - Champion of the Feria de Estella 2014."
  - Villacarrillo Silver Muleta, awarded by Peña Taurina Sol y Sombra de Villacarrillo.
  - Champion of the Feria en Palencia, ruling from the Feria San Antolín Jury.
  - Champion of the Feria en Pamplona, awarded by el Diario de Navarra.
  - I Chicote Trophy. Best faena at the Feria de Soria, awarded by the company Vin Tauromaquia XXI.
  - XXIV Silver Estoc. Best estocada at the Feria de Soria, awarded by "Peña Taurina Soriana".
  - XXXIII Silver Ear. Best faena including the suprema stage in Soria, awarded by "Peña Taurina Soriana".
  - XXIV Segundo Ayllón Bullfighting Trophy. Champion of the Feria en Soria, awarded by Soria council.
- 2013
  - Prize for Best Bullfighter at the Feria de San Isidro 2013, awarded by Telemadrid.
  - Best faena at the fiestas del santo "The Miraculous Wheel" in Santo Domingo de la Calzada. "Club Taurino Calceatense".
  - Golden Ear 2013 season's Champion, from Radio Nacional de España.
  - Best faena at the Feria de San Isidro. Taurodelta.
  - Best estocada at the Feria de San Isidro. Taurodelta.
  - Cordobés Hat for the "most bullfighting work", Feria San Isidro. Casa de Córdoba.
  - Depth Trophy, Feria San Isidro. Alamares de oro.
  - Best estocada at the Feria de San Fermín, Pamplona. Club taurino.
  - Best faena, Feria de Julio, Valencia. Diputación de Valencia.
  - Best estocada at the Feria de Julio, Valencia. Diputación de Valencia.
  - César Girón Champion, Arles. Club Taurino Paul Ricard.
  - XXXII Silver Ear, best faena, including the suprema stage, Feria de Soria. "Peña Taurina Soriana".
  - Best bullfight, Feria de Logroño. Club Taurino Logroñés.
  - Best quite, Feria de Logroño. Peña taurina El Quite.
  - VII Best faena, Feria de El Pilar de Zaragoza. "Rincón Taurino el Mentidero".
  - Champion 2013 temporada, southwest of France. Asociación clubs taurinos Paul Ricard.
  - Champion at the Feria de Ciudad. Royal Council of Ciudad Real.
  - Best estocada, Feria de San Isidro. Club Taurino Villa de Pinto.
  - Most artistic faena, Feria de San Isidro. Restaurante Man de Alpedrete.
  - Best faena, Feria de Maracaibo. Mayor's office and Municipal Bullfighting Commission.
  - Bullfighter of the Year in France. Claude Popelin.
- 2012
  - Best faena at the Feria de Ambato (Ecuador).
  - Best faena, Feria de Salamanca from Salamanca City Council.
  - Best faena, Feria de Salamanca from "Peña Taurina Salmantina".
  - Season's Champion in the southwest of France, French critics and informants.
  - Season's best faena at the Feria de Dax. "Peña Taurina de Dax".
  - Golden Ear 2012 Season's Champion. Radio Nacional de España.
  - Best faena at the Feria de Alfaro. Club Taurino de Alfaro.
  - "Los Sombreros de Radio MDM" as season's champion in France. Radio MDM de Mont-de-Marsan.
  - Best faena of the XX Duitama Bullfighting Season. Empresa del coso Duitaurina (company).
  - "César Girón" Trophy of Arles. Club Taurino Paul Ricard.
  - Madrid's Best Bullfighter, Feria de San Isidro. Telemadrid.
- 2011
  - VII prize to the "Revelation Bullfighter" at San Isidro 2011, awarded by Onda Cero Radio.
  - XII "Bullfighting Fable" prize to the 2011 San Isidro champion from "Círculo Taurino Amigos de la Dinastía Bienvenida".
  - Sombrero Cordobés for the Best Estocada at the Feria de San Isidro 2011 from the "Casa de Córdoba" in Madrid.
  - Special Prize for his performance at San Isidro 2011, from the "Unión de Abonados y Aficionados Taurinos de Madrid".
  - Special Mention by the jury of the XVII Bullfighting Prizes of the Casino de Madrid, for his performance at the Feria de San Isidro.
  - Prize for the Best Estocada at the Feria de Pamplona 2011, from Club Taurino de Pamplona.
  - Prize to the "Revelation Bullfighter" of the 2011 season, from Federación de Peñas Asturianas.
  - Prize for the best faena at the Feria de Iscar 2011, from Asociación Taurina y Cultural de Íscar.
  - Prize to the "Revelation Bullfighter" of the 2011 season, from Hotel Ercilla (Bilbao).
  - "Pase de las Flores" Prize to the "Revelation Matador" of the 2011 season, from "Peña Taurina Victoriano de la Serna" de Sepúlveda (Segovia).
  - Prize for the Matador within the "Enrique Ponce" prizes, from Club Allard de Madrid.
  - Prize to the Best Matador 2011 from the VII "Villa Arrocera" National Prizes, from "Asociación Taurina El Quite de Calasparra".
  - XXI Santiago Apóstol Trophy 2011 to the champion of the Feria de Collado Villalba 2011, from peña taurina "Gallete".
- 2010
  - Courage Prize 2010 (VI National Prizes “Villa Arrocera”) from "Asociación Taurina El Quite (Calasparra)".
- 2009
  - Golden Pocha as champion of the Feria de Sangüesa (Navarre).
- 2008
  - Golden Pocha as champion of the Feria de Sangüesa (Navarre).
- 2007
  - Prize for the best quite at Bilbao's Aste Nagusia festival.

== See also ==
- List of bullfighters
