= José María Dols Samper =

Spanish bullfighter (born 1982)

José Mari Manzanares (hijo)
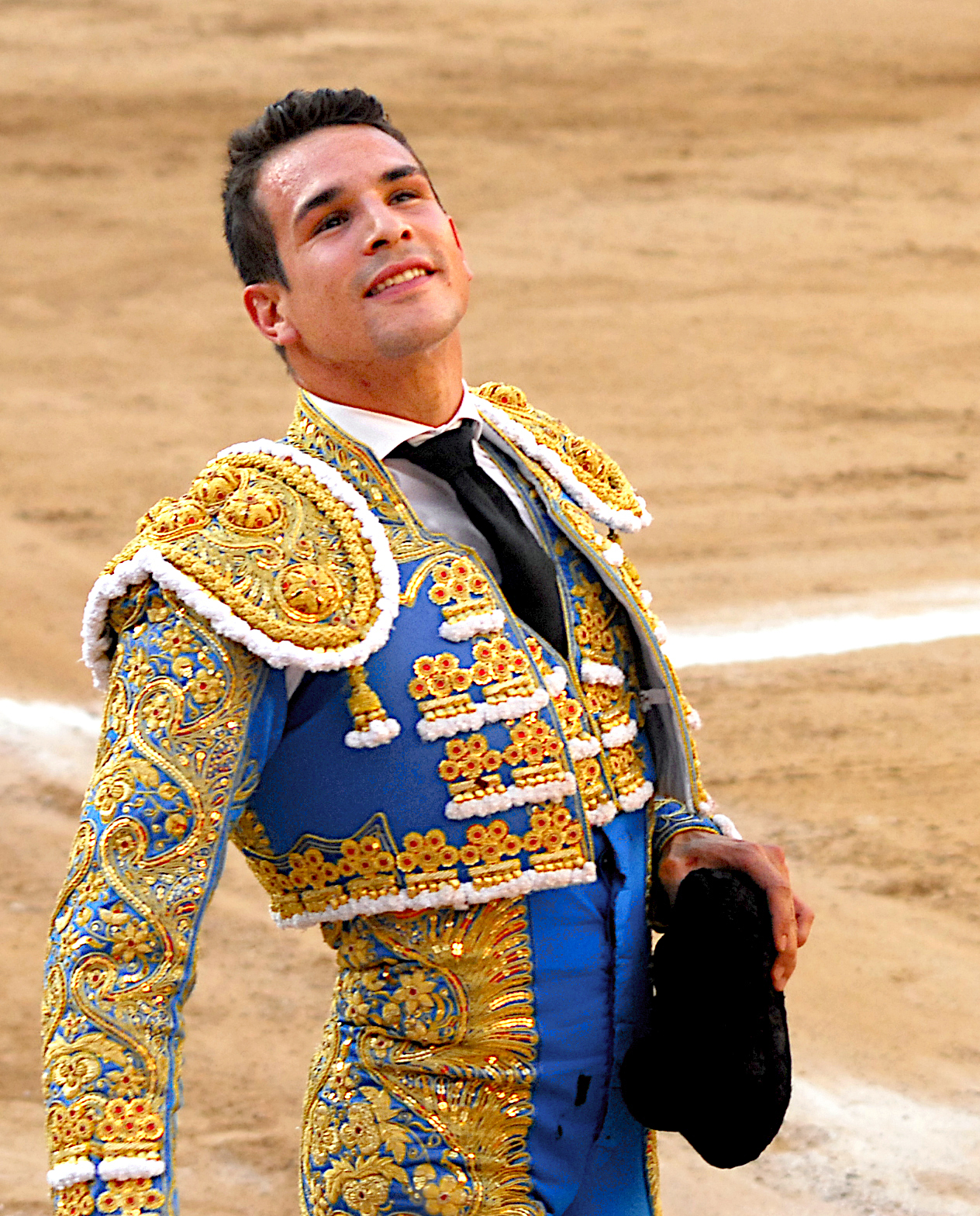
- Manzanares at the Melilla bullring, 2009

Personal information
- Nationality: Spanish
- Born: José María Dols Samper; 3 January 1982 (age 44) Alicante, Spain
- Home town: Alicante
- Occupation(s): Bullfighter; Model
- Years active: 2002–present
- Agent: Toño Matilla, Jorge Matilla (apoderados)
- Spouse: Rocío Escalona (m. 2010)
- Children: José María; Julieta; Gabriela
- Parents: José Mari Manzanares (father); Resurrección Samper (mother)
- Relative(s): Manuel Dols Samper (brother)
- Website: www.josemariamanzanares.com/

José María Dols Samper (Spanish: [xoˈse maˈɾia ˈðols samˈpeɾ]; born 3 January 1982), also known professionally as José Mari Manzanares hijo (Spanish: [xoˈse ˈmaɾi manθaˈnaɾes ˈixo]) (Note: The word hijo means "son" and is used to distinguish Dols from his father, who used the same name professionally.) is a Spanish bullfighter and model. He has twice been borne shoulder-high out through the Great Gate at the Las Ventas bullring in Madrid.

== Early life ==
Manzanares grew up in a family whose affinity for bullfighting was very strong, for not only was his father the bullfighter José Mari Manzanares, but his grandfather, José María Dols Cantó ("Pepe Manzanares"), was a novillero and later a subalterno and a banderillero. He began studies in veterinary medicine but eventually gave them up to give himself over wholly to tauromachy.

In 2001, when he was 19 years old, he presented himself as a becerrista (novice who fights calves) at a charitable bullfighting festival in Campotéjar, at which he cut four ears and two tails. He alternated with M. González Porras, José Fuentes, José María Manzanares (his father), Enrique Ponce, and Joaquín Puga, while bulls were supplied by the Giménez Indarte ranch. He made his début with picadores at Nîmes, France on 22 February 2002, alternating with David Luguillano and Juan Bautista, and with bulls supplied by Victoriano del Río.

== Bullfighting career ==
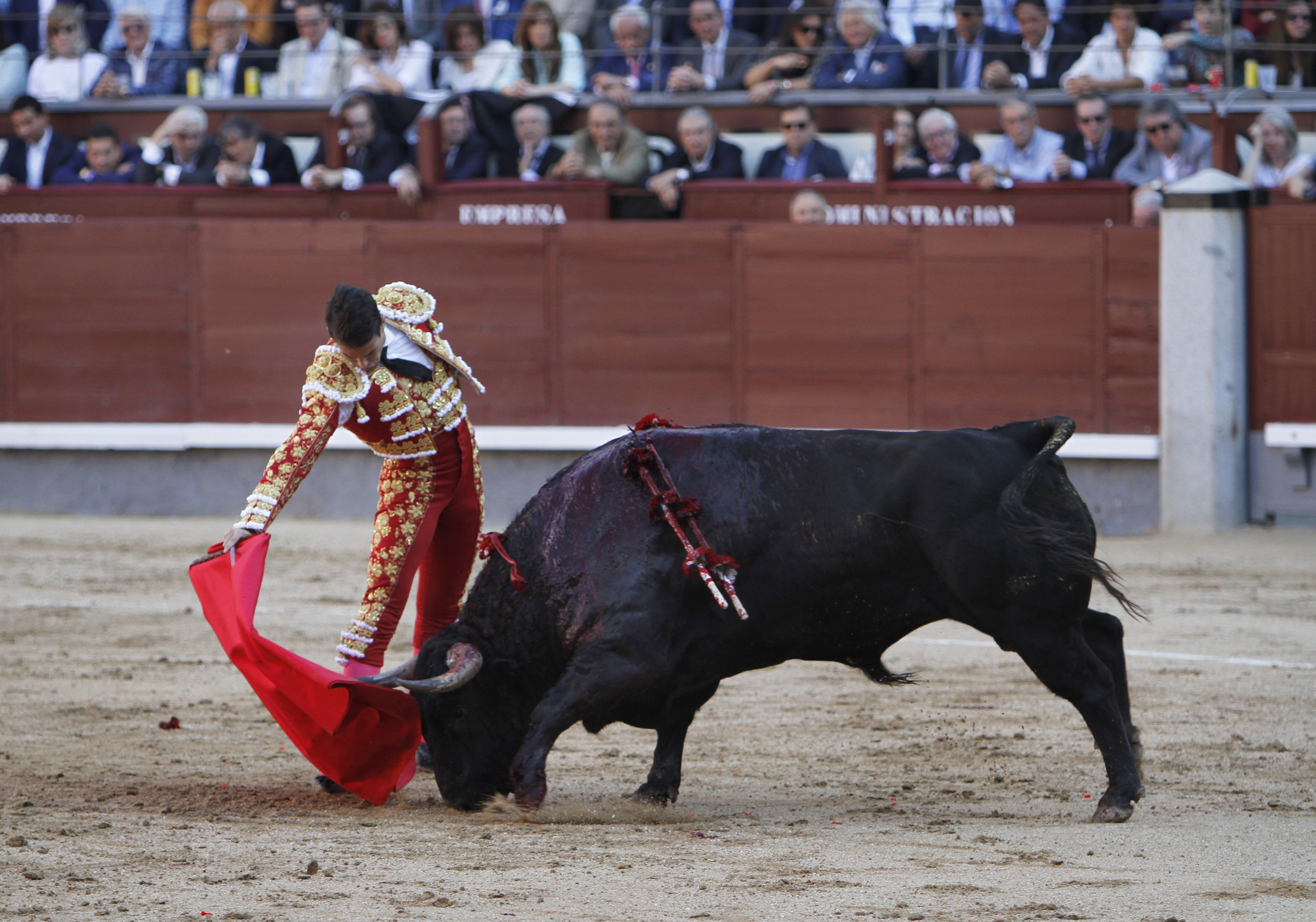
Manzanares's derechazo (Note: The derechazo is a bullfighting manoeuvre in which the bull is led with the muleta, held in the right hand and supported with the sword, by the bullfighter's right side.) at Las Ventas

Manzanares took the alternativa at the Feria de Hogueras de San Juan ("Saint John's Fair of Bonfires") in his hometown of Alicante on 24 June 2003. Standing as "godfather" was Enrique Ponce, while Francisco Rivera Ordóñez stood as witness. Manzanares cut one ear off his first bull (variously named Virreino or Birreiro by different sources), and both ears and the tail off his second; both bulls were supplied by Daniel Ruiz Yagüe's ranch.

Since taking his alternativa, he has kept to his decision not to headline the bullring, that is to say, he will never seek top billing. This he manages by giving the alternativa to novilleros (bullfighters who are not yet fully fledged matadors) or by appearing after other veteran bullfighters, with few exceptions, such as cases of mano a mano bullfights (ones at which only two bullfighters appear, instead of the usual three). He had the confirmation of his alternativa on 18 May 2005 at Las Ventas. Standing as "godfather" this time was César Jiménez, while Salvador Vega stood as witness. Bulls, including the one that Manzanares slew for his confirmation, named Catavino, were supplied by the Garcigrande ranch. On 19 November 2006, he also had his alternativa confirmed at the Plaza México, the world's biggest bullring, with El Juli as "godfather" and José Luis Angelino y Bricio as witness. Bulls were supplied by the Los Encinos ranch, and Manzanares reaped two ears on this occasion. He had also had another confirmation in Colombia on 1 February 2004 at the Santamaría Bullring in Bogotá, with Enrique Ponce standing as "godfather" and Manuel Libardo as witness. The bull slain in that ceremony was Cerillero, furnished by the Achury Viejo ranch. Manzanares got an ovation at that event.

On 1 May 2006, between tears and in an emotional act, he cut off his father's coleta (bullfighter's queue) on the occasion of the elder Manzanares's farewell to the bullring. In the 2007 bullfighting season – from which he had to withdraw in September because of a dengue infection, possibly contracted from a mosquito bite during an engagement in Tropical America – and the 2008 season, too – from which he also had to excuse himself after catching another virus – he fought together with his father on numerous occasions. His style is considered to be at a high artistic level and to be serious and deep. In the 2008 bullfighting season he had resounding triumphs at the Seville Fair when he appeared at the Maestranza, at Alicante's Feria de Hogueras, at Acho in Lima, and at Valencia in Venezuela, being borne out the gates at his appearances.

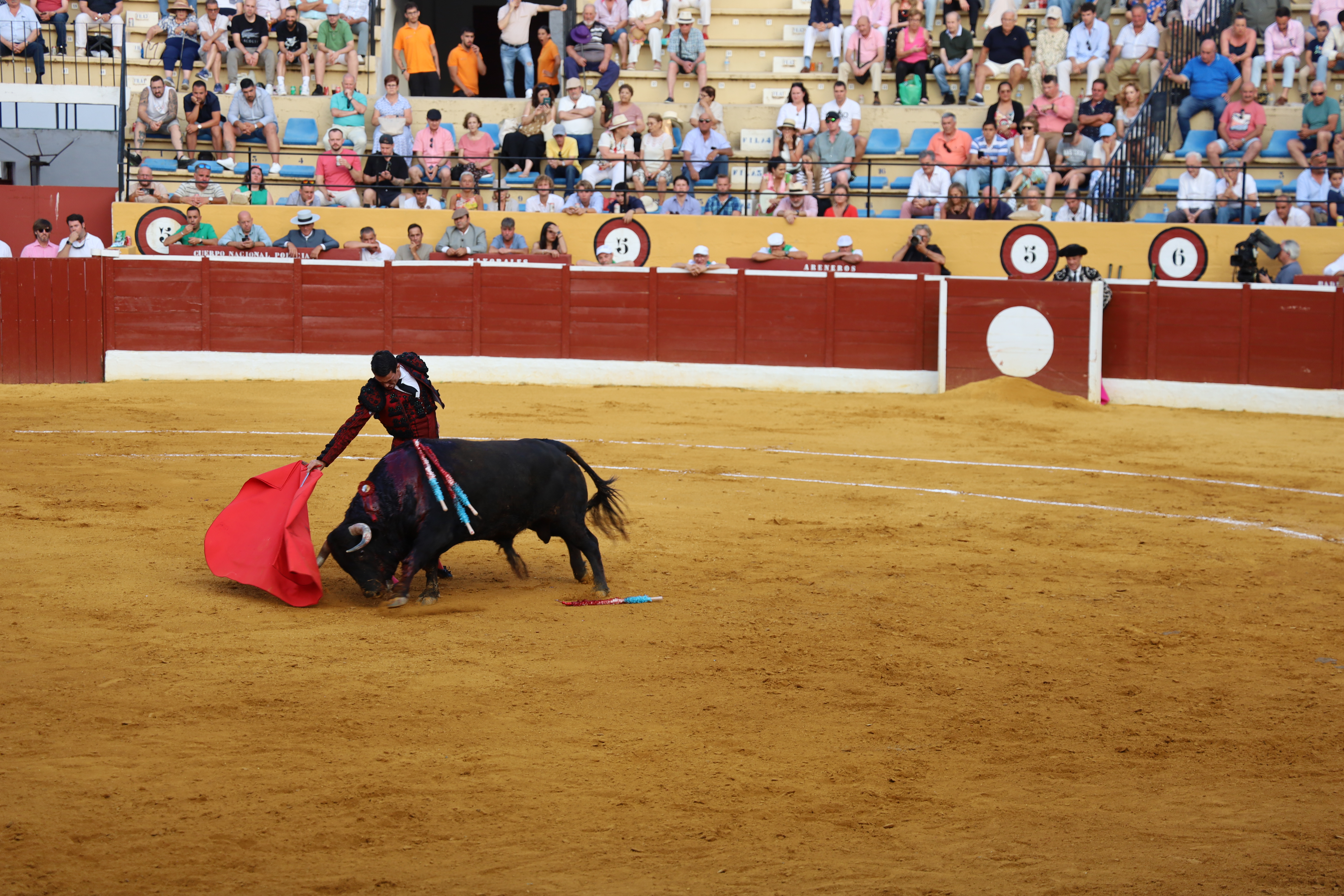
Jose Maria Manzanares bullfighting in Malaga, 2025.

The 2011 bullfighting season was very important for Manzanares. On 18 May, he was taken shoulder-high out through the Great Gate at Las Ventas after slaying bulls supplied by the Núñez del Cuvillo ranch, among them one named Trapajoso. He also got an ovation and two ears, sharing the billing with El Juli and Sebastián Castella. On 30 April, he spared one of his bulls, (Note: A bull can be spared the sword, in a process called an indulto, if he is deemed to have fought very well. He is then sent back to the ranch where he came from and becomes a stud, the hope being that this will improve the breed.) named Arrojado, from the Núñez del Cuvillo ranch, at the Maestranza. This indulto was the first in the bullring's history since 1965, when a young bull had likewise been spared. Campanito, the other bull who met Manzanares that afternoon, was, however, not as lucky as Arrojado. On 28 September, Manzanares was borne out through the Great Gate at La Monumental in Barcelona together with Morante de la Puebla and Julián López Escobar "El Juli". Bullfighting aficionados bore them shoulder-high all the way to their hotel in an historic moment for the defence of bullfighting, this having been the last year when bullfights were held at this bullring.

In 2016, at the yearly Corrida de Beneficencia ("Charity Bullfights"), Manzanares was borne out through the Great Gate at Las Ventas, together with López Simón, after slaying bulls furnished by the Victoriano del Río ranch. Sebastián Castella was the third bullfighter on the bill that afternoon. Worth pointing out among these bullfights are the times when Manzanares was borne out through the gate at Béziers in 2011 (together with Sebastián Castella this time), 2014, and 2021; in Nîmes in 2013; at the Plaza México in 2007; at the Plaza de Toros Cañaveralejo in Cali, Colombia in 2013; at the Arènes du Plumaçon bullring in Mont-de-Marsan, France, in 2014; and at Valencia in 2012, 2014, 2015, and 2017.

== Modelling career ==
In 2012, Manzanares began his career as an advertising model for some haute couture firms, appearing in VMan sporting Carine Roitfeld's styles, which included a gladiator's skirt. In 2013, he was Givenchy's spring-summer-season male image. In 2015, he starred, alongside Blanca Padilla, in Dolce & Gabbana's spring-summer-season campaign, which was inspired by bullfighting.

== Personal life ==
On 6 November 2010, Manzanares wed Rocío Escalona, a prestigious plastic surgeon's daughter, at Alicante's Church of Our Lady of Grace (Iglesia de Nuestra Señora de Gracia). They have three children, José María (born 2011), Julieta (born 2013), and Gabriela (born 2016).

Manzanares's brother, Manuel Dols Samper, is himself a rejoneador.
