= Juan José Padilla =

Spanish bullfighter (born 1973)

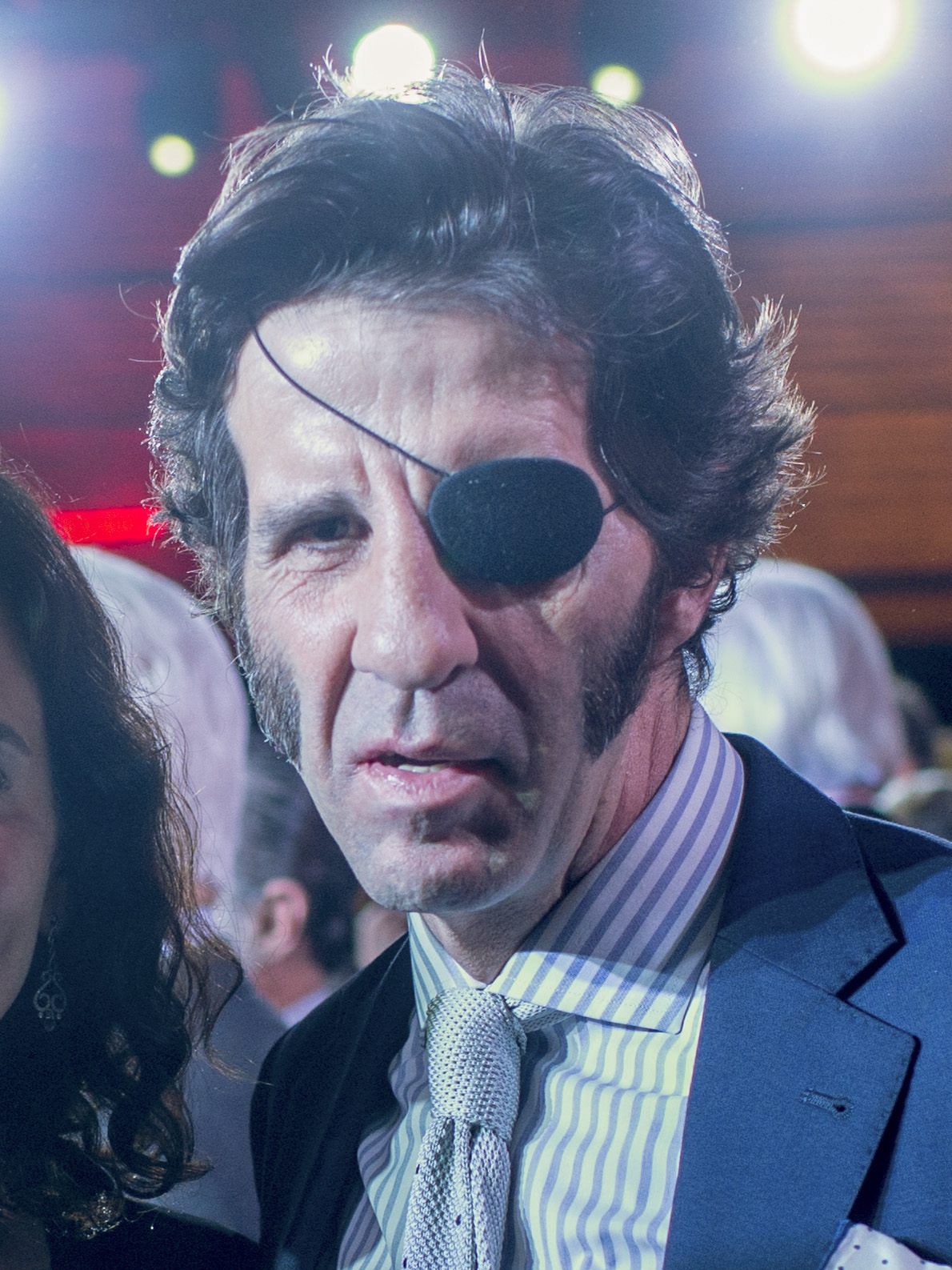
- Padilla in 2019

Personal information
- Nickname(s): Cyclops of Jerez, The Pirate
- Born: May 23, 1973 (age 52) Jerez de la Frontera, Spain

Sport
- Sport: Bullfighting
- Rank: Matador

Juan José Padilla is a Spanish torero ('bullfighter'). He became a matador de toros, 'killer of (full-grown) bulls', in the town of his birth, Jerez de la Frontera, on June 18, 1994 when he was 21 years old. He was known as the 'Cyclone of Jerez' and featured heavily, both personally and professionally, in Into The Arena: The World Of The Spanish Bullfight, a shortlisted nominee for the William Hill Sports Book of the Year in 2011.

On October 7, 2011 he was gored by a bull in Zaragoza, almost dying from his injuries. From a single horn wound through his skull, he suffered multiple fractures to both jaw and skull, facial paralysis, loss of hearing in his right ear and of sight in his left eye.

Five months later in March 2012, he returned to the bullring with an eyepatch - gaining the nickname 'The Pirate' – in Olivenza. The author of Into The Arena, Alexander Fiske-Harrison, who had trained as a torero with Padilla and was now a personal friend, accompanied him for British GQ magazine and ended by describing the result of that day's triumphant return: "it is Padilla alone who is swept up to tour the ring on the shoulders of the crowd. Then I see that it is not the crowd, but other bullfighters. An entire profession is holding him up so that an entire nation can applaud him. That night Padilla is on every news channel; come the morning he will be on the front page of every newspaper. When I meet him at the hotel afterwards, he has tears in his eye."

He has continued to fight throughout the season with a hero's welcome - and failures - in both major bull-rings and minor ones, including Valencia, Seville, Bilbao, Pamplona, La Línea de la Concepción, and the town where he grew up, Jerez de la Frontera, and the town he now lives in, neighbouring Sanlúcar de Barrameda.

On March 12, 2017 at a bullfight in Valencia, he was gored through the thigh and chest, suffering a punctured lung.

Having announced his intention to retire at the end of the year in 2018, his final tour of the bull rings of Spain was marked with great successes and further injuries. In July 2018, Padilla lost his footing during a bullfight in Arévalo and fell to the ground after he was struck several times by the bull. He returned to the ring in Pamplona a few days later. His final corrida was with the bulls of Núñez del Cuvillo in the Feria de El Pilar in Zaragoza, the same ring where he had lost his eye seven years before. Cutting two ears from his final bull, he was carried out of the ring on the shoulders of the crowd and finally retired, still number one in the escalafón, the official ranking of matadors in Spain.

== See also ==
- Bullfighting
- List of bullfighters
- Torero
