= Campo Lugar =

Spanish municipality

Coordinates: 39°12′0″N 5°46′0″W

- municipality
- Flag Coat of arms
- Interactive map of Campo Lugar
- Country: Spain
- Autonomous community: Extremadura
- Province: Cáceres
- Municipality: Campo Lugar

Area
  - Total: 73 km^{2} (28 sq mi)
- Elevation: 296 m (971 ft)

Population (2025-01-01)
  - Total: 790
  - Density: 11/km^{2} (28/sq mi)
- Time zone: UTC+1 (CET)
  - Summer (DST): UTC+2 (CEST)

Campo Lugar is a municipality located in the province of Cáceres Extremadura, Spain. According to the INE has a population of approximately 1108 inhabitants.

== See also ==
- List of municipalities in Cáceres
