= Arènes Maurice-Lauche =

Bullring in Aire-sur-l'Adour, France

Coordinates: 43°42′9″N 0°15′32″W

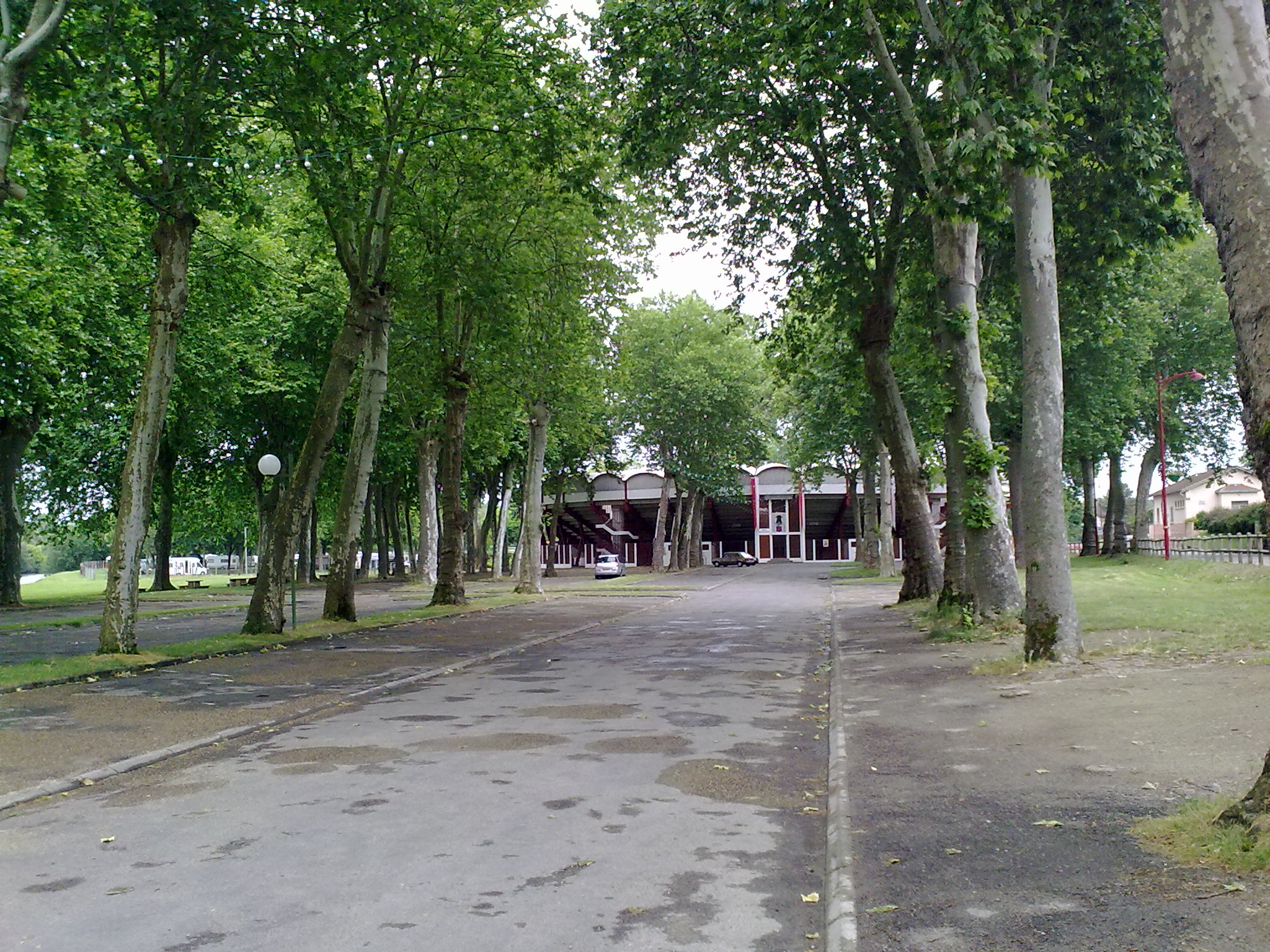
The Arènes Maurice-Lauche

The Arènes Maurice-Lauche (French: [aʁɛn mɔʁis loʃ]) are (Note: The French name is grammatically plural, hence the plural verb.) a bullring in the town of Aire-sur-l'Adour, Landes in the south of France. The facility hosts both the local pursuit of Course landaise and Spanish-style bullfighting.

== Beginnings ==
Even before there was a bullring in Aire-sur-l'Adour, the town had bull spectacles. They began in the 16th century, when bull runs took place on workdays outside the cathedral; the Church, of course, forbade such things on Sundays and holidays. In 1647, the Bishop of Aire then forbade the bull runs on any day. For a while, there was a dearth of bull-running activity, but the runs came back in earnest later when Kings Louis XIII and Louis XIV backed the prelates' initiatives (which were obviously at odds with the bishop's), as did the Intendants of Guyenne.

Before the French Revolution broke out, a compromise was reached in Aire-sur-l'Adour over the bull runs: it was agreed that these bull games would be tolerated as long as they were held in enclosed places, and not through temporarily barricaded streets.

The first bullring in the town was built in the 1850s. It was built of wood on the paths along the Adour, at the foot of the monumental stairway. It was not a permanent, year-round structure and could be dismantled. It was also fairly small and could accommodate only 300 people. In 1885, the city's amphitheatre commission proposed moving the arena back to the end of the promenade, thus providing "public promenades with easy access and pleasant attendance and also providing a magnificent place for the fairground".

The Aire-sur-l'Adour bullring was first built sometime around 1920. This early version was wooden, and by 1959, there was serious discussion in town about building a more lasting structure. By the 1970s, the wooden bullring's best days were clearly well behind it. It was decided to tear the old bullring down to make way for a new structure, this one built of concrete. It rose at the far end of the Allées de l'Adour in 1972. The architect who designed it was Robert Dubedat. The new arena was inaugurated on 18 June 1972 by the town's former mayor Olivier Darblade on the occasion of the town's festivals. The opening day was marked with a celebratory bullfight with the bullfighters Dámaso González, Francisco Ruíz Miguel, and Antonio José Galán taking turns fighting the bulls that were supplied that day by the Infante da Cámara ranch.

== Facts and figures ==
The Aire-sur-l'Adour bullring had a reinauguration on 21 May 1997, and it was at this time that it was dubbed Arènes Maurice-Lauche, a name that it still bears to this day. Maurice Lauche was town council secretary general, and also a great bullfighting aficionado, and the new bullring was a project that he worked to realize. The seats are spread over 13 rows of stands served by 11 stairways. The bullfighting ground (Spanish: ruedo), covered in ochre sand measures 40 m across and is girt by a callejón (the row just behind the barrier, used by those directly involved in the bullfighting) whose width is 1.5 m, with 10 refuges within the bullfighting ground. The Arènes Maurice-Lauche can seat up to 4,200 spectators, or even as many as 4,500. (Note: Sources disagree about this.)

The bullring's perimeter is ringed by a fence made partly of brick barriers. Bullfight-goers reach the seats through ten great access gates, as well as the main gate, made of wrought iron and surmounted by the town's coat of arms rendered in moulded glass by a master glassmaker from Bordeaux. One half of the structure is covered by curved aluminium roofing segments.

Adjoining the main structure is a broad patio for cuadrillas, surrounded by an infirmary, a bullfighter's chapel, and a big stable for the horses. The bulls can be kept in five corrals which open into the bullpens, which themselves lead into two passages to the bullfighting ground.

== Celebrations ==
In 2022, Aire-sur-l'Adour marked its bullring's fiftieth anniversary. The special guest for the celebration was Francisco Ruíz Miguel, who had been one of the bullfighters on the bill for the inaugural corrida at the then new bullring. The festivities included, of course, bullfights.

== Incidents ==
=== Gale damage ===
On 7 July 2023, a gale in Aire-sur-l'Adour brought down a heavy sycamore tree standing right next to the bullring. Nobody was injured, but the tree fell right on some of the roofing sections that cover one side of the arena, doing considerable damage to not only the aluminium tops but likewise to the fibre cement panels facing outwards from the arena. The bullring was closed for two months while work was done to set right what the wayward sycamore had done to the structure.

=== Bullfighter's death ===
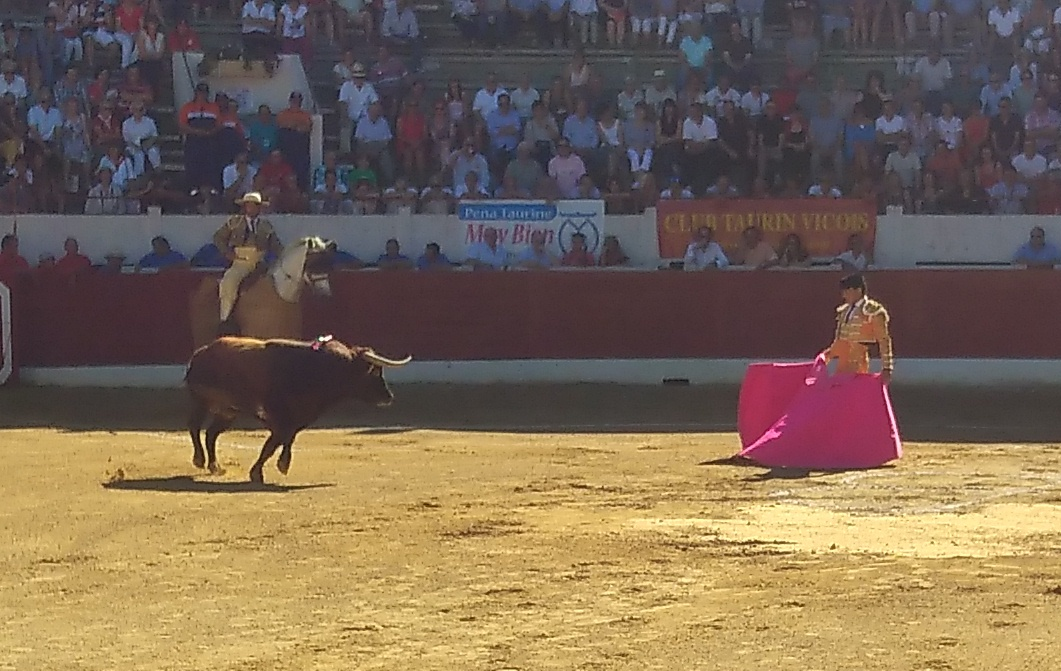
Fandiño at the Arènes Maurice-Lauche on 17 June 2017, shortly before the incident that killed him

On 17 June 2017, the Arènes Maurice-Lauche were the scene of a fatal injury to a bullfighter during a bullfight. Thirty-six-year-old Spaniard Iván Fandiño was facing a bull from the Baltasar Ibán ranch named Provechito, and was gored, with the bull's horn inflicting damage to several organs, and perhaps most significantly Fandiño's inferior vena cava. After being attended at the bullring's own infirmary, where the injury's seriousness became quite obvious, Fandiño was transferred to the Hôpital Layné in Mont-de-Marsan, where he died of cardiac arrest. The doctors who treated him could only certify his death. Indeed, according to one report, Fandiño was actually pronounced dead in the ambulance during his transfer to the Hôpital Layné.

Four days after this event, the bullring was open for a four-hour period for those who wished to "share a moment of reflection and homage" with Iván Fandiño.

Unveiled on 29 September 2019 – which would have been Fandiño's 39th birthday – at the entrance to the Arènes Maurice-Lauche, was a monument in Fandiño's memory. The sculptor was Sergio del Amo. It was a project of the French Board of Bullfighting Clubs and was funded by popular subscription.

== Sources ==
- Maudet, Jean-Baptiste (2010), "Annexe CD-Rom", Terres de taureaux: les jeux taurins de l'Europe à l'Amérique, Madrid: Casa de Velasquez, ISBN 978-84-96820-37-1
