= Bullfighter =

Performer in the activity of bullfighting

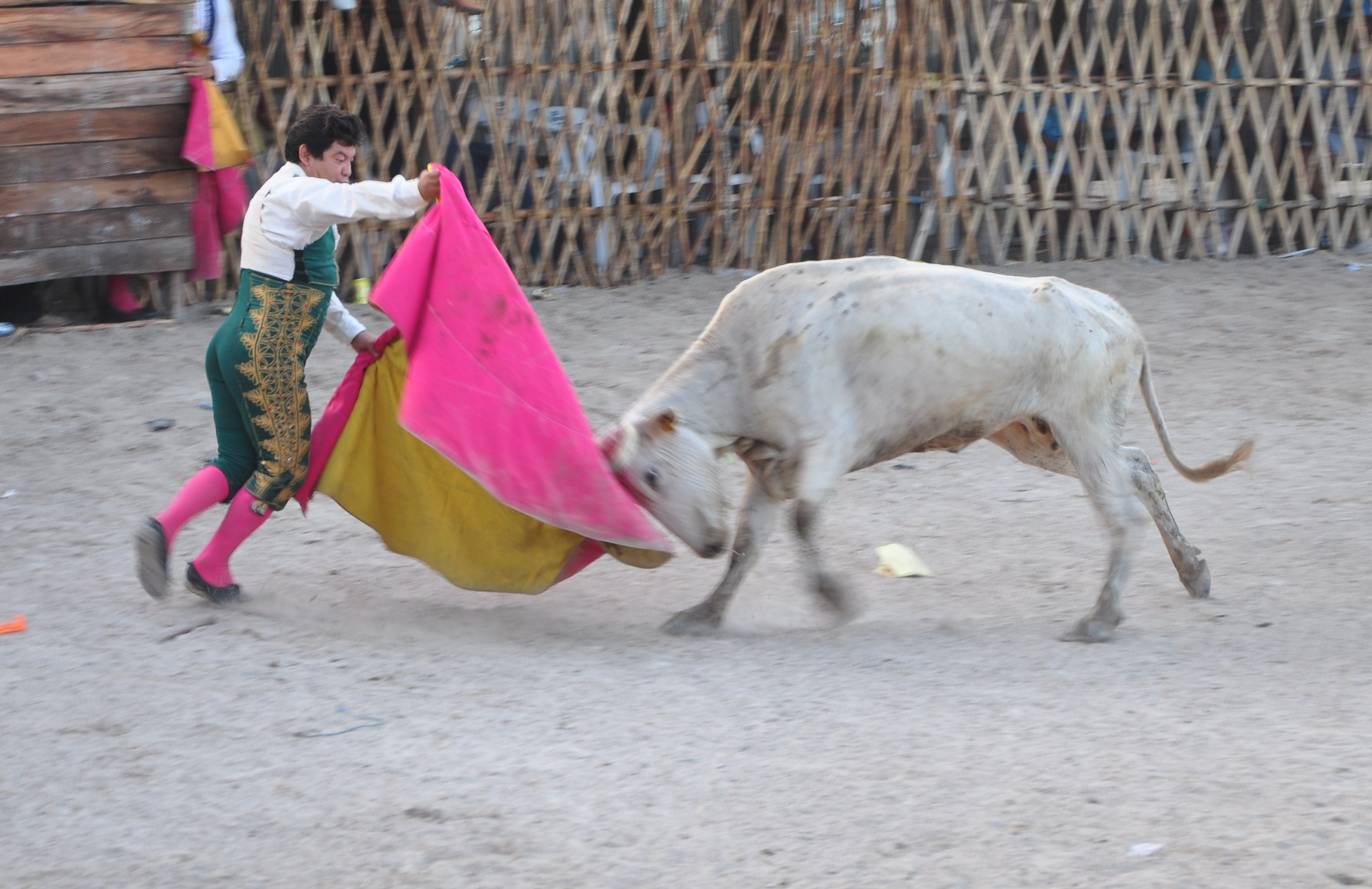
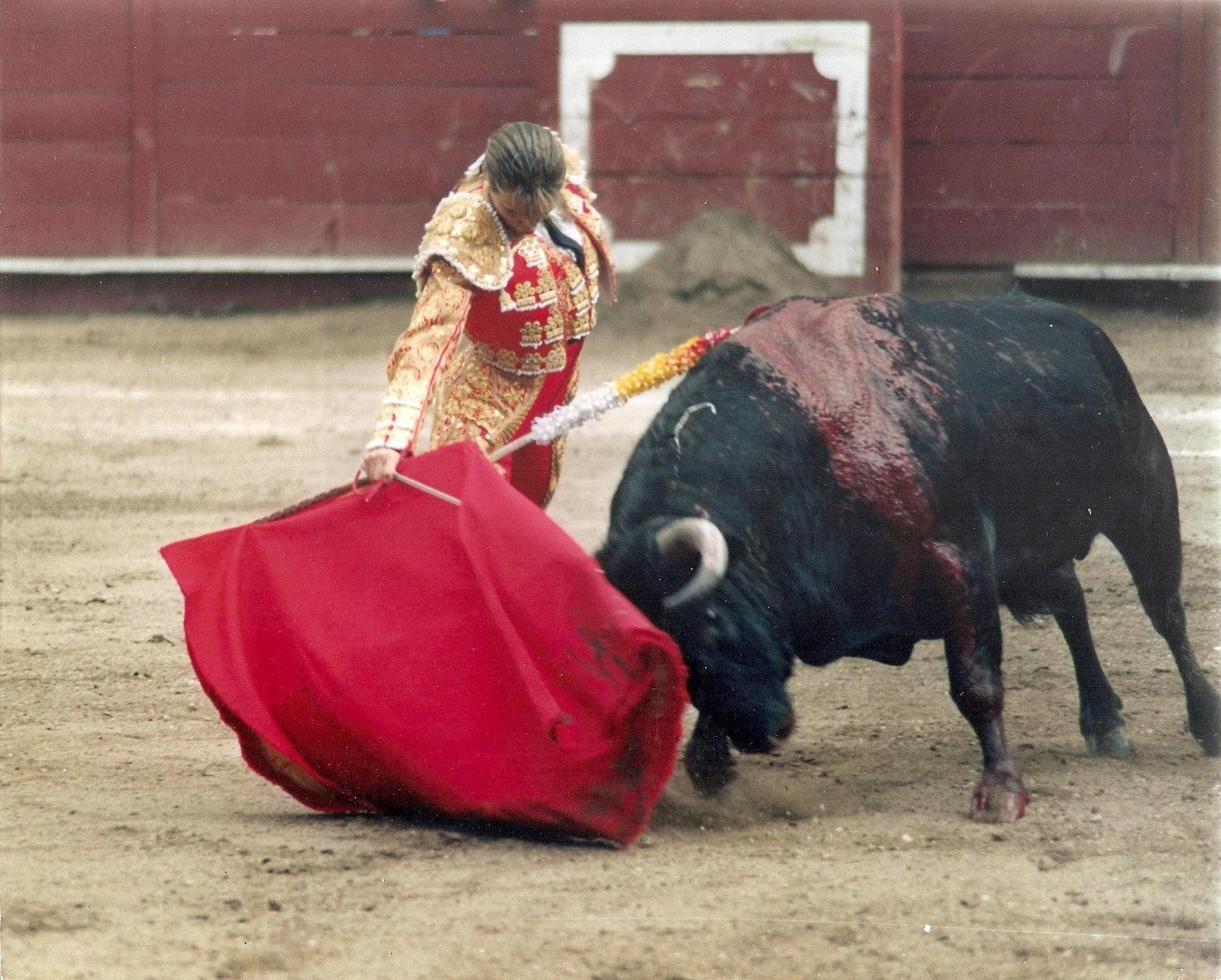
A male (top) and female (bottom) bullfighter demonstrating the Suerte de Capote of Spanish-style bullfighting in 2019 and 2010, respectively

A bullfighter or matador (also matadore; /ˈmætədɔːr/) is a performer in the activity of bullfighting. Torero (Spanish: [toˈɾeɾo]) or toureiro (Portuguese: [toˈɾɐjɾu]), both from Latin taurarius, are the Spanish and Portuguese words for bullfighter, and describe all the performers in the activity of bullfighting as practised in Spain, Portugal, Mexico, Peru, France, Colombia, Ecuador, Venezuela and other countries influenced by Portuguese and Spanish culture. The main performer and leader of the entourage in a bullfight, and who finally kills the bull, is addressed as maestro (master), or with the formal title matador de toros (killer of bulls). The other bullfighters in the entourage are called subalternos and their suits are embroidered in silver as opposed to the matador's gold. They include the picadores, rejoneadores, and banderilleros.

While most competitors have historically been male, women have competed in bullfighting since the sport's beginnings and make up a growing share of competitors since the 19th century.

Usually, toreros start fighting younger bulls (novillos or, more informally in some Latin American countries, vaquillas), and are called novilleros. Fighting of mature bulls commences only after a special match, called "the Alternative". At this same bullfight, the novillero (junior bullfighter) is presented to the crowd as a matador de toros.

== History ==
Bullfighting on foot became a means for poor, able-bodied men to escape poverty and achieve fame and fortune, similar to the role of boxing in other countries; this is reflected in the Spanish saying Más cornadas da el hambre. ("Hunger gives more gorings."). Also, bullfighters often come from a family of bullfighters.

In English, a torero is sometimes referred to by the term toreador, which was popularized by Georges Bizet in his opera Carmen. In Spanish, the word designates bullfighters on horseback, but is little used today, having been almost entirely displaced by rejoneador. Bullfighting, historically, started more with nobles upon horseback, all lancing bulls with accompanying commoners on foot doing helper jobs. As time went by, the work of the commoners on foot gained in importance up to the point whereupon they became the main and only act. Bullfighting on horseback became a separate and distinct act called "rejoneo" which is still performed, although less often.

The established term, Maletilla or espontáneo, is attributed to those who illegally jump into the ring and attempt to bullfight for their sake and glory. While the practice itself is widely despised by many spectators and fans alike, it is often claimed that some bullfighters started their careers in this way, El Cordobés being one of them.

== Types ==
=== Matador de toros ===
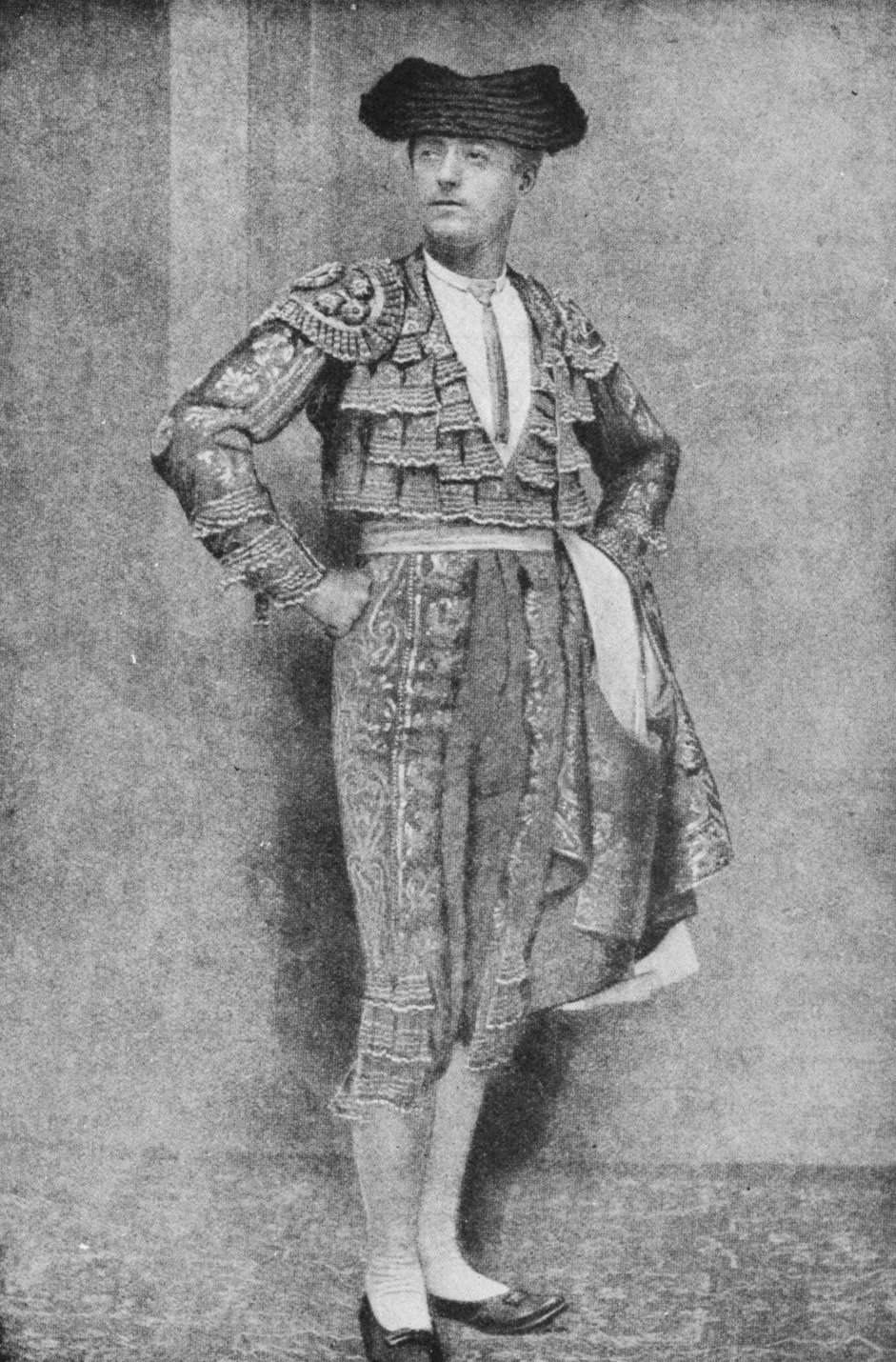
Early 20th-century photograph of a matador, showing traditional outfit in 1935.

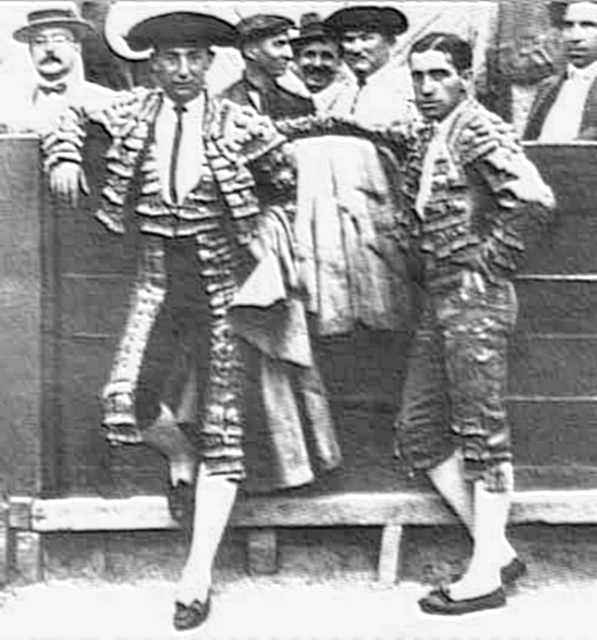
Joselito and Belmonte

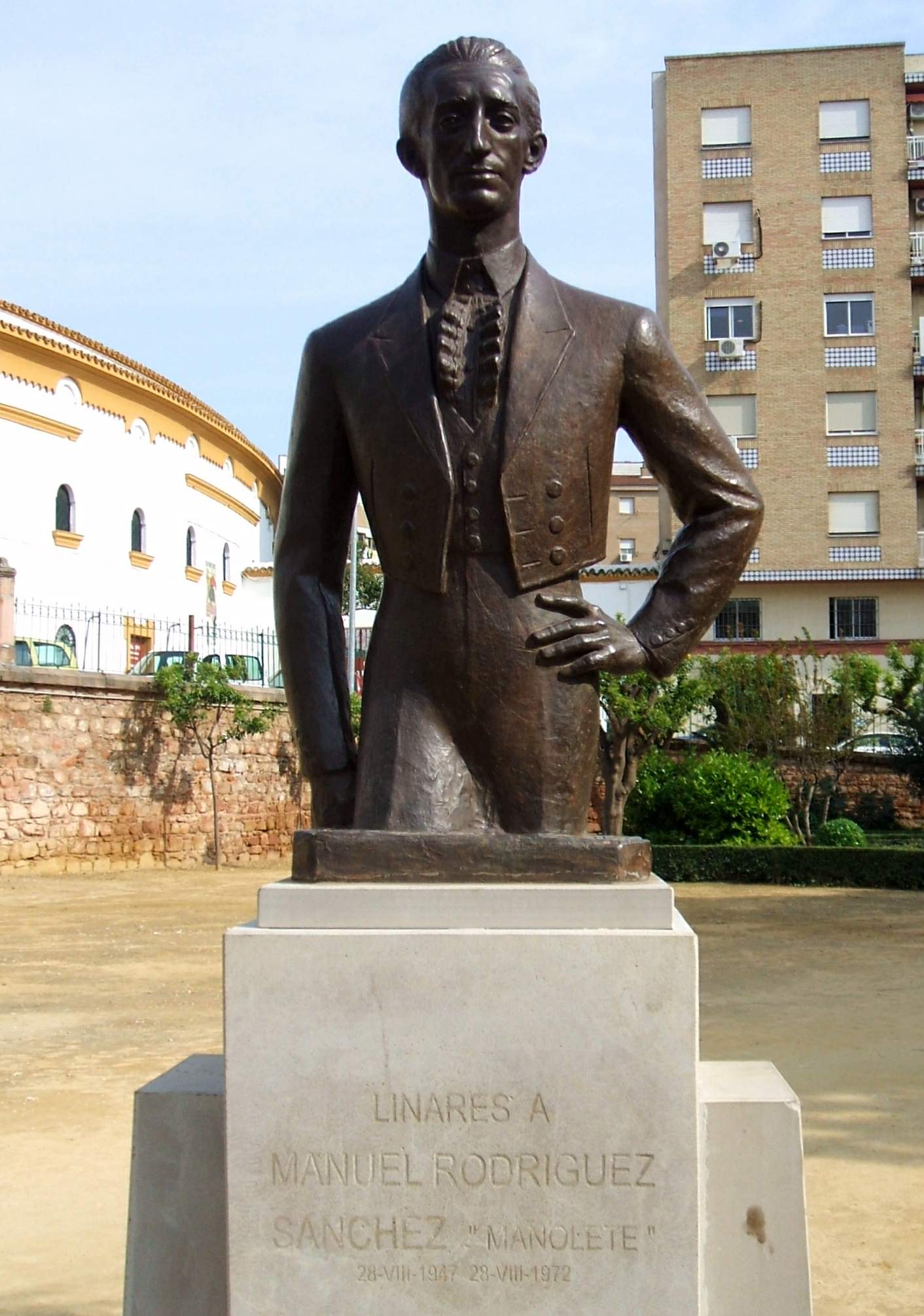
Manolete

A matador de toros (lit. "killer of bulls", from Latin mactator, killer, slayer, from mactare, to slay) is considered to be both an artist and an athlete, possessing agility and coordination. One of the earliest matadors was Juan Belmonte (1892–1962), whose technique in the ring fundamentally changed bullfighting and remains an established standard by which bullfighters are judged by aficionados. The style of the matador was regarded as being equally important as whether he killed the bull or not. The more successful matadores were treated like rock stars, with comparable financial incomes, cult followings and accompanied by tabloid stories about their romantic conquests with women.

The danger associated with bullfighting adds to the matador's performance; they are regularly injured by bulls and, concurrently, 533 professional bullfighters have been killed in the arena since 1700. Spanish bullfighter Manolete died from an injury in 1947. Matador Iván Fandiño died on 17 June 2017 at the Arènes Maurice-Lauche in Aire-sur-l'Adour, France, from a similar bullfighting injury. This hazard is said to be central to the nature and appeal of bullfighting.

The American writer Ernest Hemingway was a bullfighting aficionado. In his 1926 fictional work, The Sun Also Rises, the main storyline features a matador and scenes of bullfighting, as do his short stories The Capital of the World and The Undefeated. Outside of fiction, he also wrote at length on the subject in Death in the Afternoon (1932) and The Dangerous Summer (1959).

In 1962, Hollywood producer David Wolper produced The Story of a Matador, documenting what it was like to be a matador. In this case, it was the Matador Jaime Bravo.

In 2024, film director Albert Serra created a documentary film on the bullfighter Andrés Roca Rey called Afternoons of Solitude (Tardes de soledad).

=== Picador ===
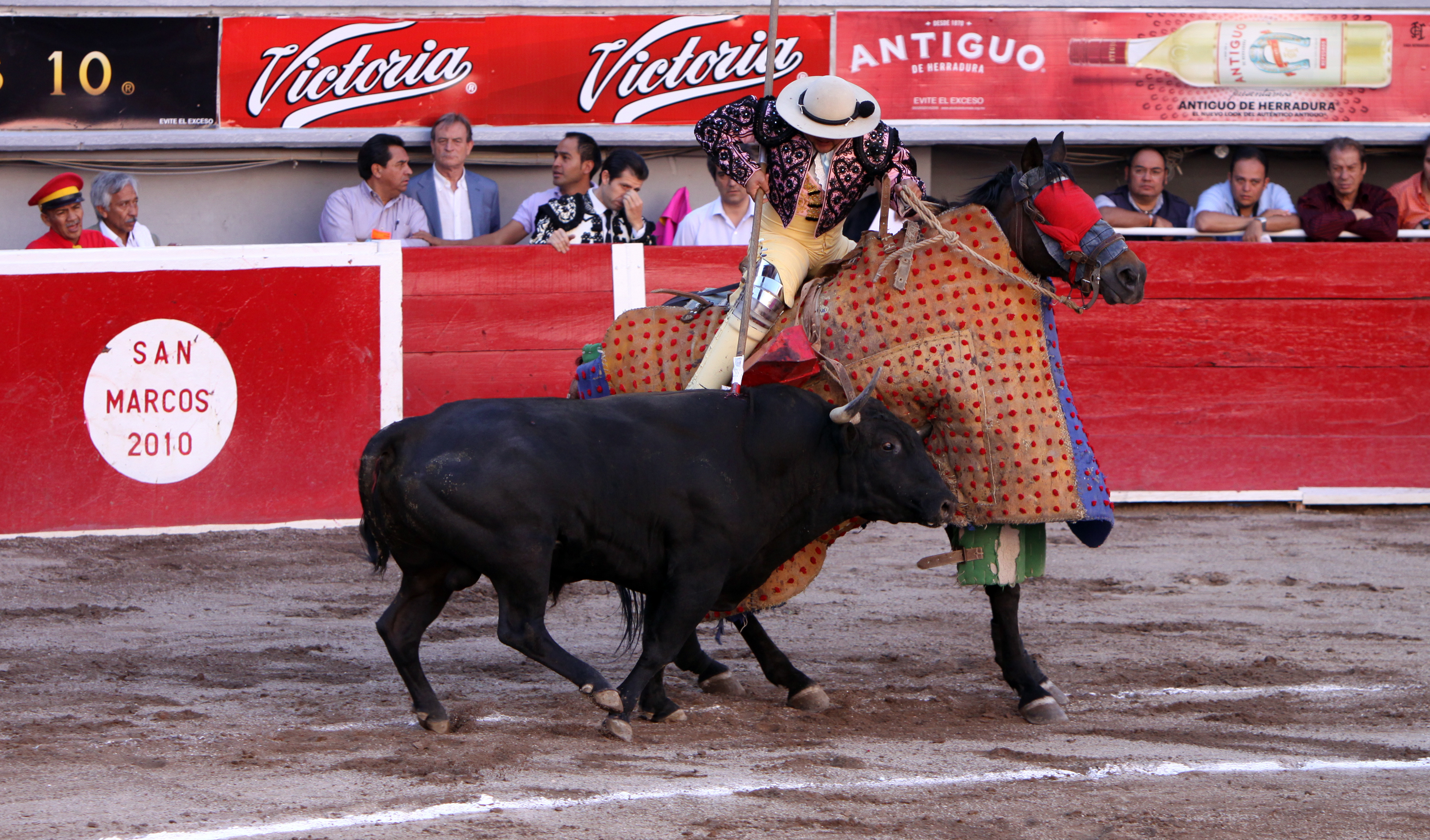
A picador on horseback lancing the bull, 2010.

A picador is a bullfighter who uses a special lance called pica while on horseback to test the bull's strength and to provide clues to the matador on which side the bull is favoring. They perform in the tercio de varas which is the first of the three stages in a Spanish bullfight. The shape of the lance or pica is regulated by Spanish law to prevent serious injury to the bull, which was viewed as unfair cheating in the past. The bull will charge the horses in the ring and, at the moments prior to contact, the picador lances the bull in a large muscle at the back of the neck; thus begins the work of lowering his head. The picador continues to stab at the bull's neck, leading to the animal's first major loss of blood. During this time, the bull's injured nape will fatigue—however, as a result of the enraged bull charging, the picador's horse will tussle with avoiding the bull throes at trying to lift the horse with its horns. The enduring loss of blood and exertion gradually weakens the bull further and makes it ready for the next stage.

In order to protect the horse from the bull's horns, the horse is surrounded by a 'peto' – a mattress-like protection. Prior to 1928, horses did not wear any protection and a bull would frequently disembowel the opposing horse during this vulnerable stage.

=== Rejoneador ===
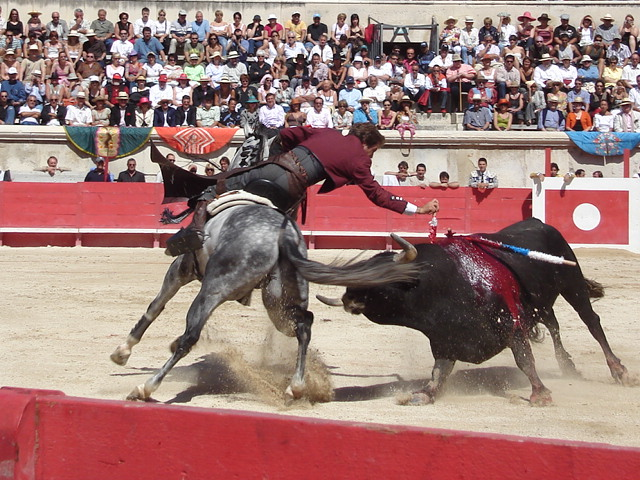
Pablo Hermoso de Mendoza

A rejoneador (Spanish pronunciation: [rexoneaˈðoɾ], pl. rejoneadores; "lancer") is a bullfighter who fights the bull on horseback; in Portugal, the same type of performer is called cavaleiro tauromáquico (Portuguese pronunciation: [kɐvɐˈlɐjɾu tawɾuˈmakiku], pl. cavaleiros tauromáquicos; "tauromachic horseman"). The rejoneo is a form of bullfighting in Portugal and in Spanish bullfighting.

=== Banderillero ===
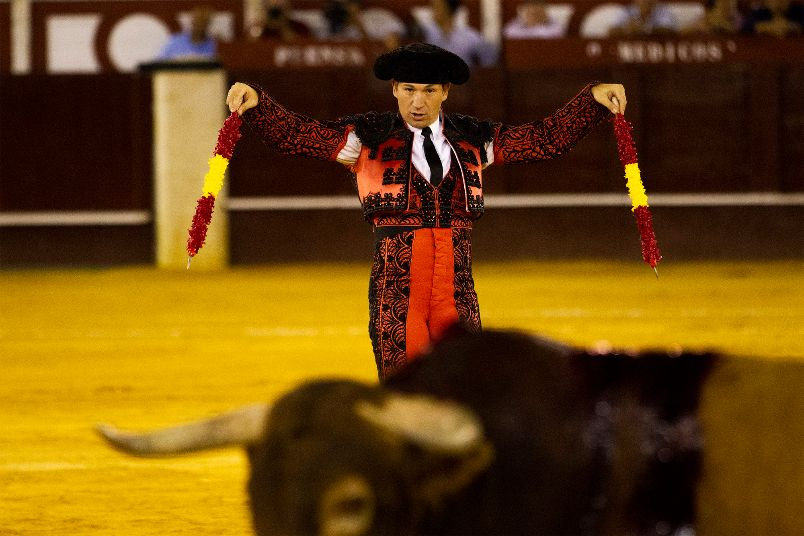
A banderillero direction towards a bull, 2018.

The banderillero is a torero who plants the banderillas (lit. little flags). These are colorful sticks, usually colored with the flag of the banderillero's birthplace, with a barbed point which are increasingly placed in the top of the bull's shoulder to weaken it. Banderilleros attempt to place the sticks while running as close to the bull as possible. They are judged by the crowd on their form and bravery. Sometimes a matador, who was a particularly skillful banderillero before becoming a matador, will place some banderillas himself. Skilled banderilleros can correct faults in the manner in which the bull charges by lancing the bull in such a way that the bull ceases hooking to one side, and thereby removing a potential source of danger to the matador by limiting the bull's offensive movements.

== Costume ==
Because of the decorations and elaborateness of the costume, the Spanish refer to the torero's outfit as traje de luces, meaning the "suit of lights". Matador costume structure provides great ease of movement.

== See also ==
- Spanish-style bullfighting
- List of bullfighters
- List of female bullfighters
- Banteng
