= Picador =

One of the pair of horsemen in a Spanish bullfight

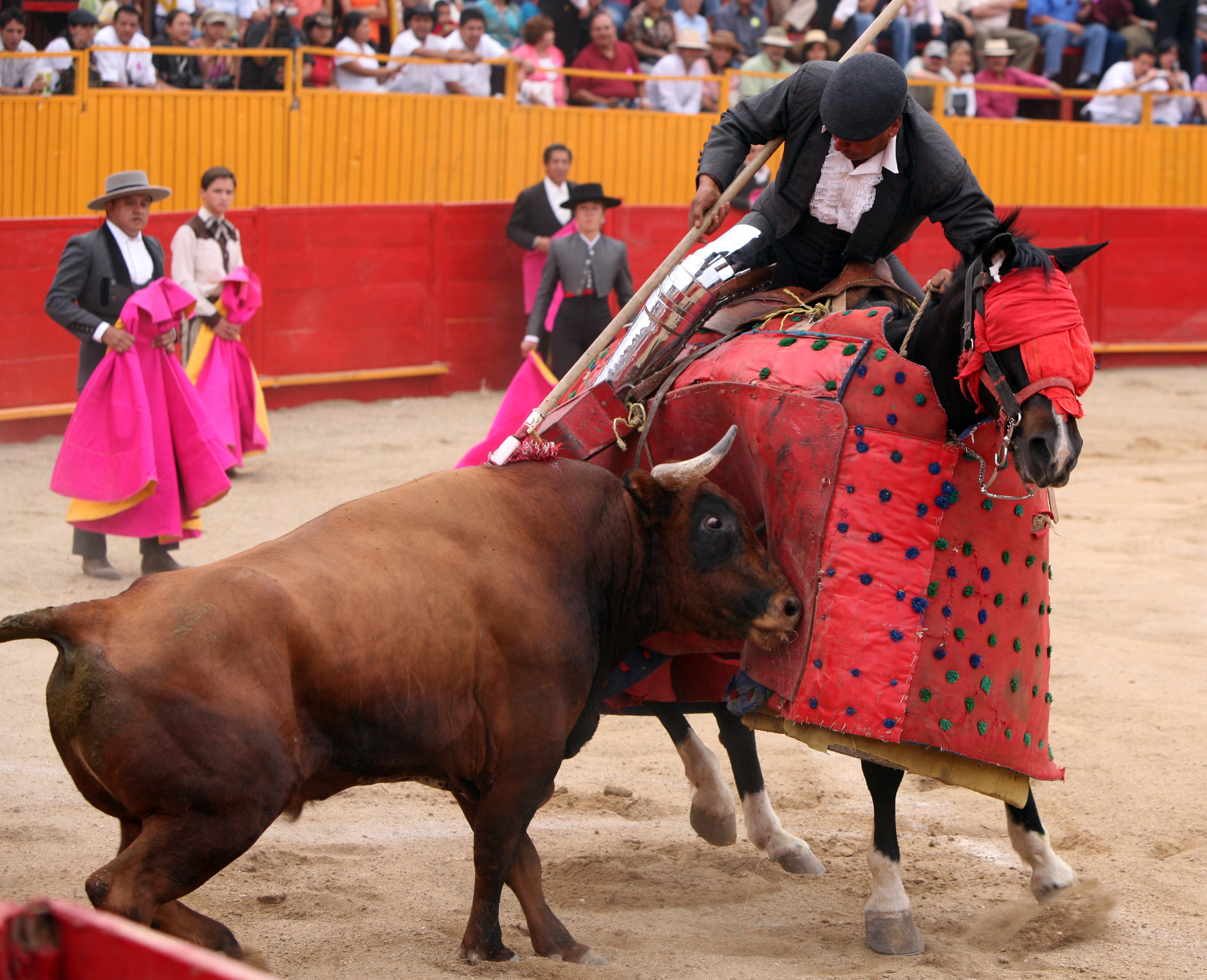
Picador in Mexico corralling with a bull, 2010.

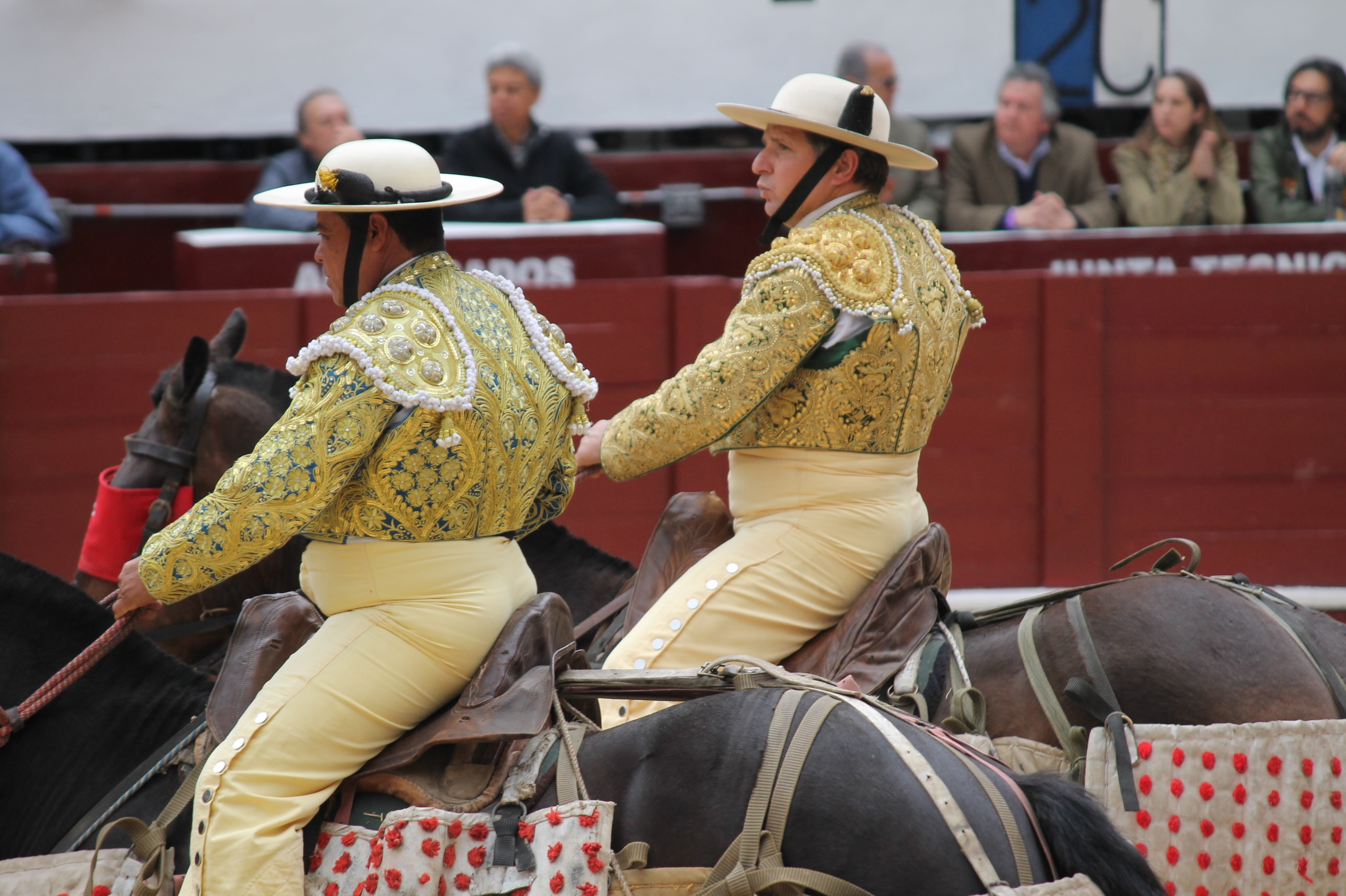
A pair of picadors en la Santa María de Bogotá, 2018.

A picador (Spanish pronunciation: [pikaˈðoɾ]; pl. picadores) is one of the pair of horse-mounted bullfighters in a Spanish-style bullfight that jab the bull with a lance. They perform in the tercio de varas, which is the first of the three stages in a stylized bullfight.

== Function ==
The picador has three main functions in a traditional bullfight:

- To pierce the muscle on the back of the bull's neck in order to straighten the bull's charge.
- To fatigue the bull's neck muscles and general stamina as it tries to lift the horse with its head.
- To lower the bull's head in preparation for the next stage.

If the public feels that a picador is better than the bull the public will whistle, boo or jeer as they see fit. This is because they do not want the bull to lose all its strength and energy as this can lead to a dull bullfight.

The picador is obliged to give the bull two lances in a first-category bullring (Barcelona, Madrid, Sevilla, Zaragoza etc.), but the matador may request that the second be waived in second- and third-category rings. The bull may receive three lances if it is particularly ferocious.

The aim of the bull to charge the picador is often cited as the biggest test of its courage. A bull that does not charge may be punished with a black banderilla, which although somewhat longer than a normal banderilla is largely symbolic and a mark of shame for the breeder.

== History ==
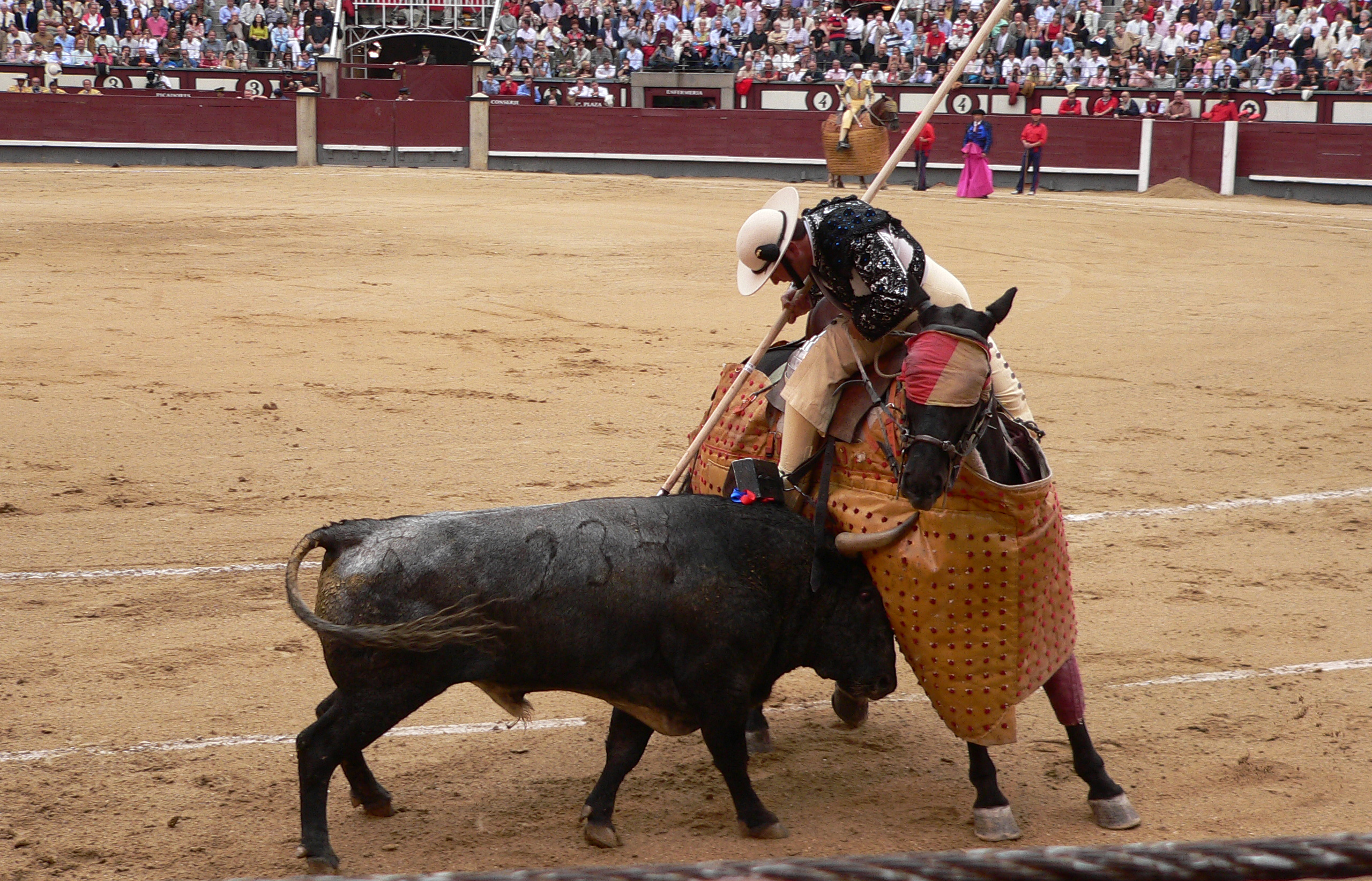
Picador in action, 2005.

Horses did not wear protection until 1928 and the bull would on occasion disembowel the horse during this stage. In Seville, Spain they retain two teams of muleteros, one to drag out the dead bull and the other to drag out any dead horses. The horse is surrounded by a peto, a mattress-like protection that greatly minimizes damage taken. Injuries to the horses often include broken ribs and damage to internal organs.

In the original days before bullfighting became recognizable in today's form, the picador was the central attraction and his name would be billed on the promotional flyers. In these bullfights the bull would charge the horse and the spectacle was watching the rider's skill in protecting his horse whilst lancing the bull. The picador would lance the bull as many times as necessary. The matador and other bullfighters were on hand to help the picador, to direct the bull to the picador, and finally to finish off the injured bull. It was not until certain foot bullfighters started to bring some flair to their minor roles, to the pleasure of the crowd, that matadors started to become the main attraction, ultimately relegating the picador to a relatively unpopular and minor function.

== See also ==
- Torero
- Rejoneador
- Spanish-style bullfighting
- Women in bullfighting
