= José Martínez Limeño =

Spanish bullfighter (1936–2015)

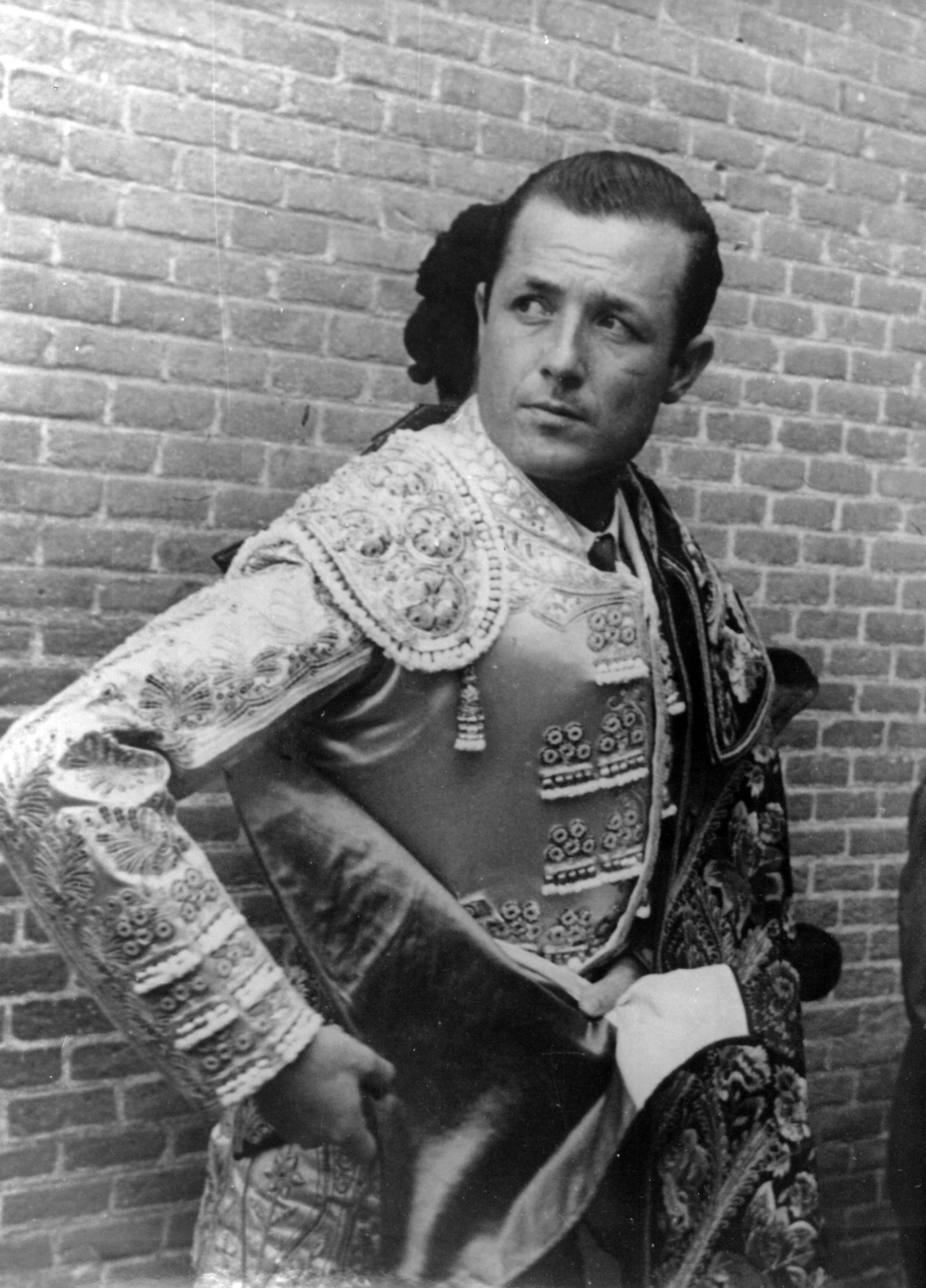
- Martínez

Personal information
- Full name: José Isaac Martínez Ahumada
- Nickname: Pepe Limeño
- Nationality: Spanish
- Born: José Martínez Ahumada; 19 September 1936 Sanlúcar de Barrameda, Spain
- Died: 18 December 2015 (aged 79) Sanlúcar de Barrameda, Spain
- Home town: Sanlúcar de Barrameda
- Occupation: Bullfighter
- Years active: 1951–1971
- Agent: Enrique Barrilaro Martínez; José Gómez "Sevillano" (apoderados)
- Children: José Luis Martínez
- Parents: Juan ("Chocolate") Martínez Ávila (father); Concepción ("Concha") Ahumada (mother)
- Relatives: Juan Luís Martínez Ahumada (brother); Antonio Martínez Ahumada (brother); Miguel Ángel Martínez Ahumada (brother); Manuel Martínez Ahumada (brother); Katherine Adams Martinez (granddaughter)
- Other interests: Business, reviewing bulls

José Isaac Martínez Ahumada (Spanish: [xoˈse isaˈak maɾˈtineθ auˈmaða]; 19 September 1936 – 18 December 2015), known as Limeño (Spanish: [liˈmeɲo]), was a Spanish bullfighter from Andalusia whose heyday was in the 1960s. Three of his brothers, Juan Luís, Antonio, and Miguel Ángel, also went into tauromachy, although they never rose above the level of novillero sin picadores.

== Early life ==
Martínez was born on 19 September 1936 – roughly two months after the Spanish Civil War had broken out – in the town of Sanlúcar de Barrameda on Spain's southern coast, near Jerez de la Frontera. Some sources even go as far as to say that he was born at the town's slaughterhouse. (Note: A slaughterhouse is a traditional place for children who aspire to be bullfighters to practise the craft.) His paternal grandfather was the caretaker there. From a young age, he already felt drawn towards bullfighting. His parents were bullfighting aficionados and his father was a modest novillero (novice bullfighter who fights yearling bulls) who used the professional nickname "Chocolate" (Spanish: [tʃokoˈlate]).

Martínez left school at the age of twelve to work at the family business, the Café Martínez, which had a telephone (rare in those days), and it was open round the clock. People would gather there to talk about the greyhounds, the fighting cocks, and of course the bulls, although anybody with any great knowledge of bullfighting usually only showed up once or twice each year, when a festejo was being celebrated, as there was otherwise nothing much for bullfighting aficionados in Sanlúcar. Unfortunately, the business did not last, and when the Café Martínez went under, Martínez, as the eldest sibling, was saddled with seeking the family's livelihood. He said that it did not matter to him, as he thought that he would never have been a good student anyway.

As much as Martínez wanted to be a bullfighter, fulfilling this ambition was made all the harder by there being so few in Sanlúcar who could teach him about the pursuit. There were no bullfighting schools then as there are now. What little he could learn about bullfighting came his way at the slaughterhouse, using cattle who were awaiting their own butchery, and in the tidal marshes at the Guadalquivir's mouth into the Atlantic Ocean (Sanlúcar is coastal), where cattle grazed. His first bullfighting cape was sewn at this time by his mother, using material from an awning that had been used at the Café Martínez.

Martínez had his début without picadores at the bullring in El Puerto de Santa María on 21 October 1951, and it was at the very same bullring on 10 August 1952 that he had his début with picadores. At this event, he had himself announced as Pepito Martínez, and he shared billing with Mariano Martín "Carriles" and Manuel Gómez, fighting bulls laid on by the Antonio de la Cova ranch. Given his lack of experience, though – he claimed in an interview decades later that by this time, he had never even tried his hand at a tentadero (a rural and somewhat less than professional-level bullfighting venue) – he chose to give this up for now and went back to being a novillero without picadores, even keeping his day job at a bar.

Martínez began using the nickname Limeño at a local bullfight held on 22 August 1954 at the "La Pañoleta" bullring in Camas, just across the Guadalquivir from Seville. It was a mano a mano (a bullfighting event at which there are only two bullfighters on the bill rather than the usual three) alongside Curro Romero, who was performing on home ground, and who was himself making his début in a suit of lights.

Martínez found himself performing at 10 novilladas in 1956, 7 in 1957, and 8 in 1958.

=== Adopting the nickname ===
Martínez was told by a Mr. Bragueli, who had accompanied him to an engagement over in Ceuta, that his name, "Pepe Martínez", on a bullfighting poster "would say nothing" (it is true that the name is equivalent to "Joe Martinson" in English). After being convinced of this on the boat back to Algeciras, Martínez went on a hunt for a new professional name under which to market himself. An old banderillero from Seville named Emilio Boja "Panaderito" hit on the idea of adopting the late bullfighter José Gárate Hernández's nickname, "Limeño". Martínez evidently thought it a good choice and he was known thereafter as Limeño. This is a bit of a puzzle, as "limeño" means "one from Lima" in Spanish and Martínez was not even Peruvian (and nor for that matter had Gárate been). Furthermore, Gárate had never been one of bullfighting's great stars, and his performance was often lacklustre and his health was called into question (indeed, he died of angina at a young age).

== Bullfighting career ==
Martínez had his presentation at Las Ventas in Madrid on 12 July 1959, alternating with fellow novilleros Adolfo Aparicio and José Álvarez, alongside whom he fought bulls supplied by the Don Higinio Luis Severino ranch. He had quite a successful day, not only reaping two ears from the bulls that he slew (not both from the same bull, however), but also being borne out through the Great Gate. One critic said:

Good presentation from Limeño. He is a bullfighter who begins with something primordial for anyone who wants to be a bullfighter: courage. ... He fought his two bulls with control at times, with composure at other times, and always with great serenity. He can become a good matador if he perfects his style and does not let himself be fooled by false flattery.

It was nonetheless almost a year before Martínez took his alternativa, on 29 June 1960 at the Maestranza in Seville. Standing as "godfather" on this occasion was Jaime Ostos, while Curro Romero bore witness. Bulls for the occasion were supplied by the Doña Eusebia Galache ranch, with the alternativa bull himself being named Granujillo. He got one ear and an ovation at this event.

On 24 May 1962 came confirmation of Martínez's alternativa at Las Ventas in Madrid. Standing as "godfather" this time was Diego Puerta, while Paco Camino bore witness. Bulls were laid on by the Antonio Pérez de San Fernando ranch. It would be the only time that he appeared at a corrida during the Feria de San Isidro ("Saint Isidore's Fair" — a yearly event at Las Ventas), all his subsequent engagements in Madrid falling outside this time. He earned two ovations that afternoon.

Martínez would gather up fourteen ears over the years at the bullring, Seville's Maestranza, and would also be borne on shoulders out through the Prince's Gate four times – once in 1968, twice in 1969, and once in 1970 . This raised him to something of a bullfighting cult figure, as three of those trips through the gate were in recognition of having slain bulls from the Don Eduardo Miura ranch, which is known for breeding exceptional fighting bulls. That landed him in the category of bullfighters known as gladiadores, who have proved themselves worthy of the distinction by fighting and slaying Spain's most difficult bulls. Martínez's four trips through the Prince's Gate stood as an unequalled feat, and he enjoyed great prestige in Seville because of his successes in the bullring there. He was also very closely linked to the Miura ranch, which supplied the huge bulls that he slew with such regularity. Martínez's successes at the Maestranza were such that he was thrice awarded the Oreja de Oro ("Golden Ear"), which the Diario de Sevilla presents to the one who shows himself to be the Seville Fair's champion bullfighter. These were awarded in the same years as his trips out through the Prince's Gate.

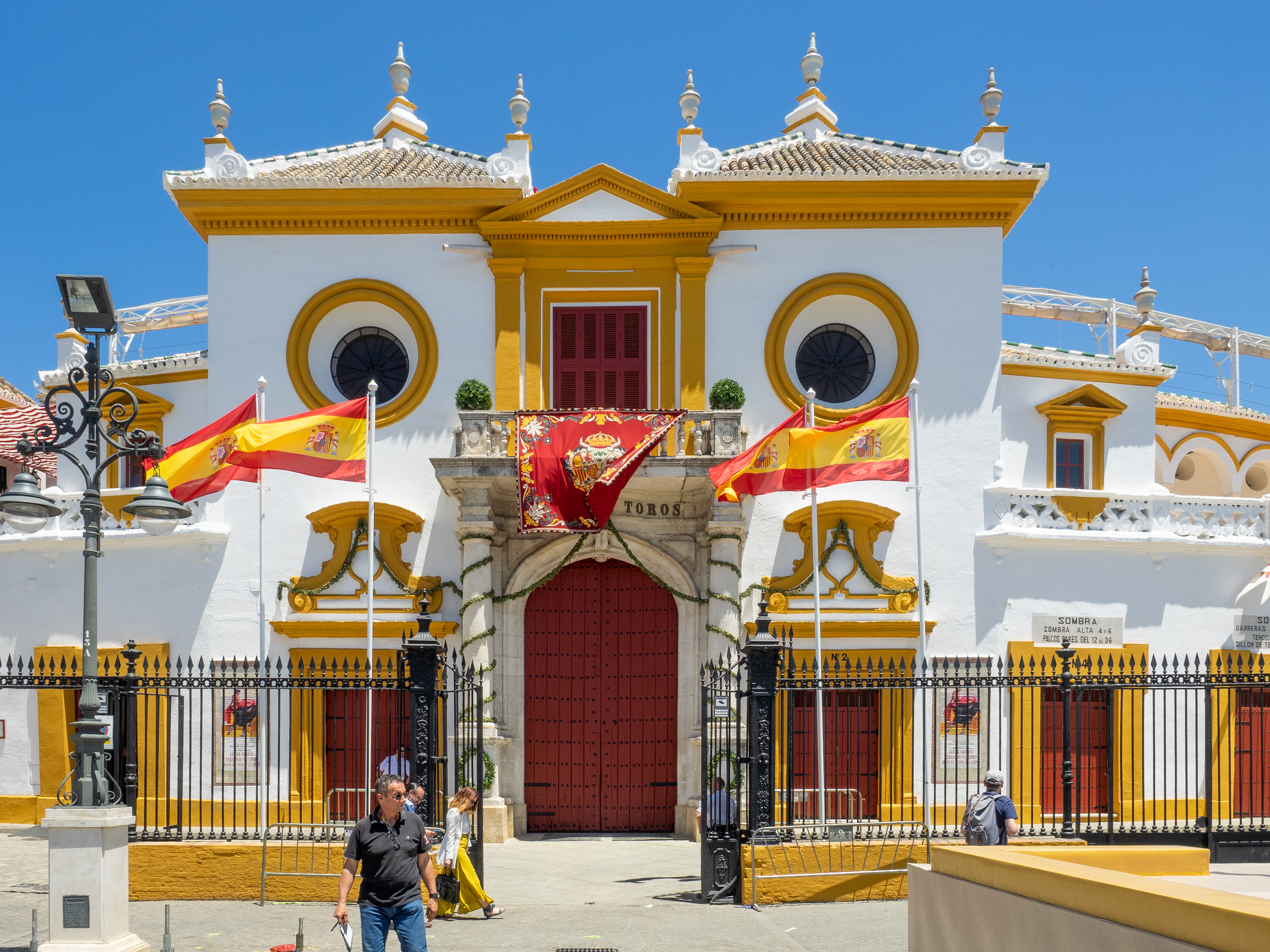
The Maestranza in Seville, where Martínez was admired for his triumphs with Miura bulls.

Standing out particularly among the bullfights at which Martínez faced Miura bulls at the Maestranza was one on the afternoon of 28 April 1968, during the Seville Fair, which was a resounding triumph in which he reaped both the fifth bull's ears. This was his first great triumph here with Miuras. Rounding out the bill that day were César Girón (who did rather badly with the afternoon's fourth bull) and the local José Luis Bernal, who had great difficulty with the two specimens that he drew at this corrida.

The next year, on 20 April 1969, there was another resounding triumph for Martínez as he reaped four ears from the bulls that he fought that afternoon and was also borne out on shoulders through the Prince's Gate. Fighting alongside him were Adolfo Rojas, a Venezuelan bullfighter from Maracay (who himself reaped one ear from the afternoon's sixth bull), and Andrés Hernando from La Velilla in the Province of Segovia (Note: The source says el segoviano de La Velilla de Pedraja, but "Pedraja" is likely a misprint for "Pedraza", which is a town in Segovia (whereas "Pedraja" is not), which does include an outlying village called La Velilla.) (who was applauded after having drawn the worst lot).

The number of bullfighting engagements that came Martínez's way over the years varied somewhat, with 13 in 1960, 23 in 1961, 20 in 1962, 10 in 1963, 14 in 1964, 13 in 1965, only four each in 1966 and 1967, and 9 in 1968. In this last year, he managed to convert a few opportunities to his advantage so that he could regain lost ground, and thus in 1969, he appeared at 23 bullfights.

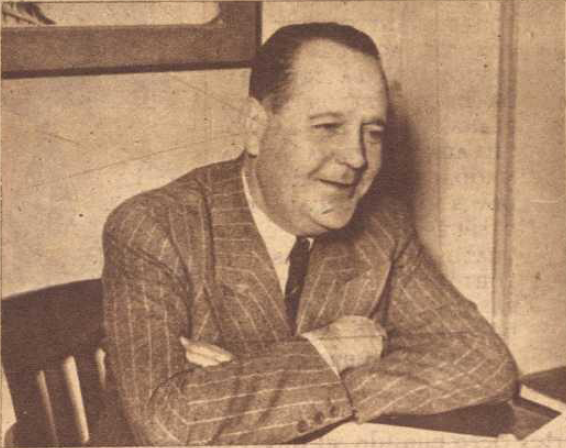
Livinio Stuyck — according to Martínez the source of his woes.

All in all, though, Martínez never quite reached the level of prominence that perhaps he should have reached. One reason for this, according to Martínez himself, was that he was exclusively bound with Diodoro Canorea, who apparently was angry with the company that ran Las Ventas in Madrid – in particular with the Las Ventas businessman Livinio Stuyck – and this precluded his appearing there or at any bullring in the north.

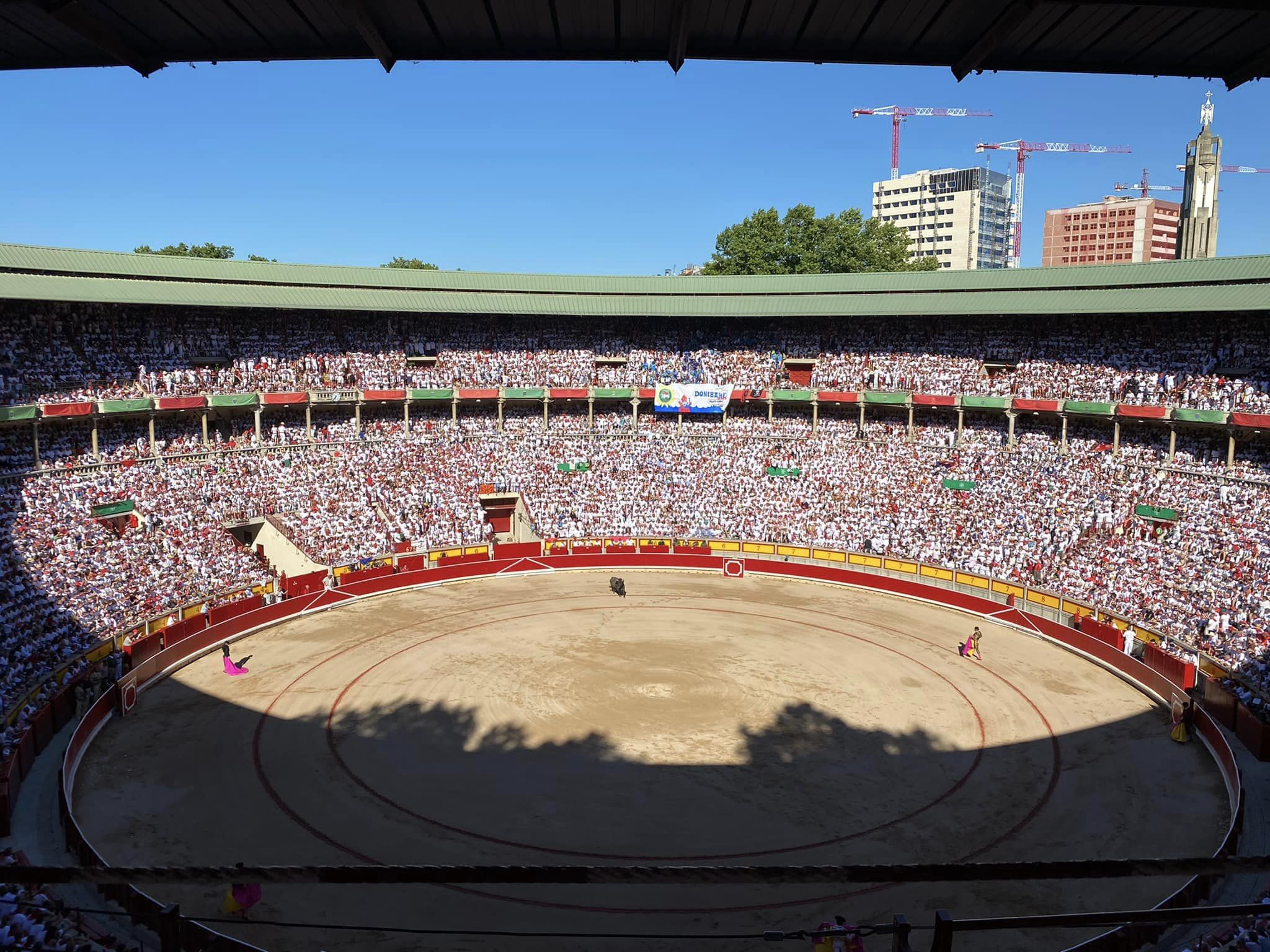
The Monumental bullring in Pamplona, where Martínez appeared on four afternoons in the 1960s (bullfight in progress).

An exception to this general rule seems to have been Pamplona, in Navarre in Spain's far north, where Martínez appeared at corridas on four afternoons. There, on 23 September 1962, he substituted for César Girón on the occasion of the World Pelota Championship being held in town that year. He alternated with Fermín Murillo, who reaped one ear, and Orteguita. They fought five bulls from the Pío Tabernero ranch, all of which were rather tame, and one fierce one from the Lisardo Sánchez ranch. The corrida did not go without incident, and indeed Martínez was called in to slay the afternoon's first bull after the beast had gored Murillo, for which Martínez received an ovation. He got silence for the afternoon's second bull, though, but applause for his last bull, the afternoon's fifth.

Only in 1969 did Martínez come back to Pamplona, this time for two corridas on the occasion of the Festival of San Fermín. On 7 July that year, he appeared alongside Paquirri and Ángel Teruel as they faced bulls from the Antonio Martínez Elizondo ranch. The two other bullfighters cut their share of ears, while Martínez got applause for the two bulls that he slew. Six days later, Martínez once again appeared in Pamplona, this time facing an encierro of José Luis Osborne bulls. He slew the first (applause) and fourth (respectful silence).

The following year, on July 12, Martínez saw his last performance in Pamplona. He did the paseíllo with Miguelín, at whom the crowd shouted, and with Andrés Vázquez, who harvested one ear. Five bulls from the Miura ranch were fought and one from the Conde de la Maza ranch, a replacement for another Miura bull that died as he was being uncrated. Martínez put forth a great effort all that afternoon, but he failed with the descabello (a downward thrust with a specially designed sword into a downed bull's neck, with the object of killing him quickly) with his first and ended up hearing the crowd's displeasure. However, the fifth bull he fought with both horns and, after slaying him, he managed to take a lap of the ring, his only and last one in the capital of Navarre. Never, though, did Martínez ever reap any appendages in Pamplona.

Another reason for Martínez's diminished prominence in bullfighting in the 1960s was based on the "brave" denunciation that he made, as a bullfighter and as a man, of what he believed had been a fixed draw of a bullfight in the middle of the Seville Fair, at which he had alternated with El Cordobés and José Luis Parada. This hurt him professionally, to the point of withdrawing from bullfighting in the middle of the 1971 April Fair.

Like any bullfighter, Martínez had his share of gorings, including a serious one at Barcelona in 1962 in which the bull broke his collarbone, one at Madrid in 1964 in which the bull gored him sideways through the belly, another at Barcelona in 1968, and one at El Puerto de Santa María.

== Later life and death ==
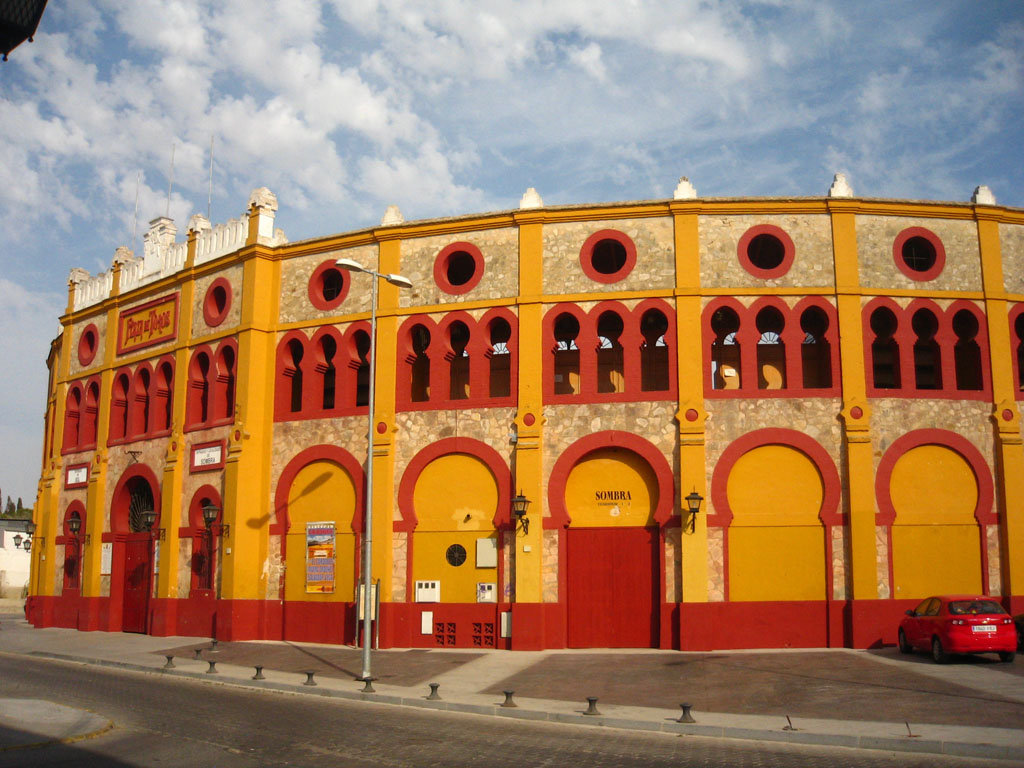
The bullring in Martínez's hometown, outside which his bust has stood since 1985.

Martínez retired from the bullrings in 1971 having felt squeezed out of the profession after the draw denunciation incident at the Seville Fair that year (one writer figuratively calls it "the most serious goring of his career"), although he twice briefly came back: once in 1980 to stand as Manuel Rodríguez Blanco's ("El Mangui") "godfather" at his alternativa (and indeed it was on this occasion that he had his bullfighter's queue – his coleta – cut off to symbolize the end of his bullfighting days), and another time to serve as businessman Simón Casas's business overseer, a job that he held until that bullfighting season ended. He fought bulls at Rodríguez's alternativa, alongside Rodríguez himself and Palomo Linares, against bulls laid on by the José Luis Osborne ranch.

Martínez, a respected man who was considered quite affable, did not altogether give up his links with tauromachy, but instead maintained them in other facets of the pursuit. This included business. He was a businessman at the bullring at El Puerto de Santa María in the years 1987 and 1988, and until his death, he was a bullfighting inspector, reviewing bulls in a rural job that he carried out for the Casas company and about which he was enthusiastic.

In April 2012, Martínez's mother, Concepción ("Concha") Ahumada died at the age of 94. She had been a great influence in his life, being herself an avid aficionada, although she had seldom been to a bullfight. He said that he loved her madly and with genuine devotion.

Martínez was a brother of a Catholic brotherhood in Cádiz called Nuestro Padre Jesús de la Sentencia y Nuestra Señora del Buen Fin de Cádiz ("Our Father Jesus of the Sentence and Our Lady of the Good End of Cádiz") – or Cofradía de la Sentencia ("Brotherhood of the Sentence") for short – whose website claims that it is a Mercedarian and Lasallian brotherhood. This same website displays a saya (a skirtlike garment) donated in 1962 by Martínez to clothe the brotherhood's icon. It is made out of an old suit of lights.

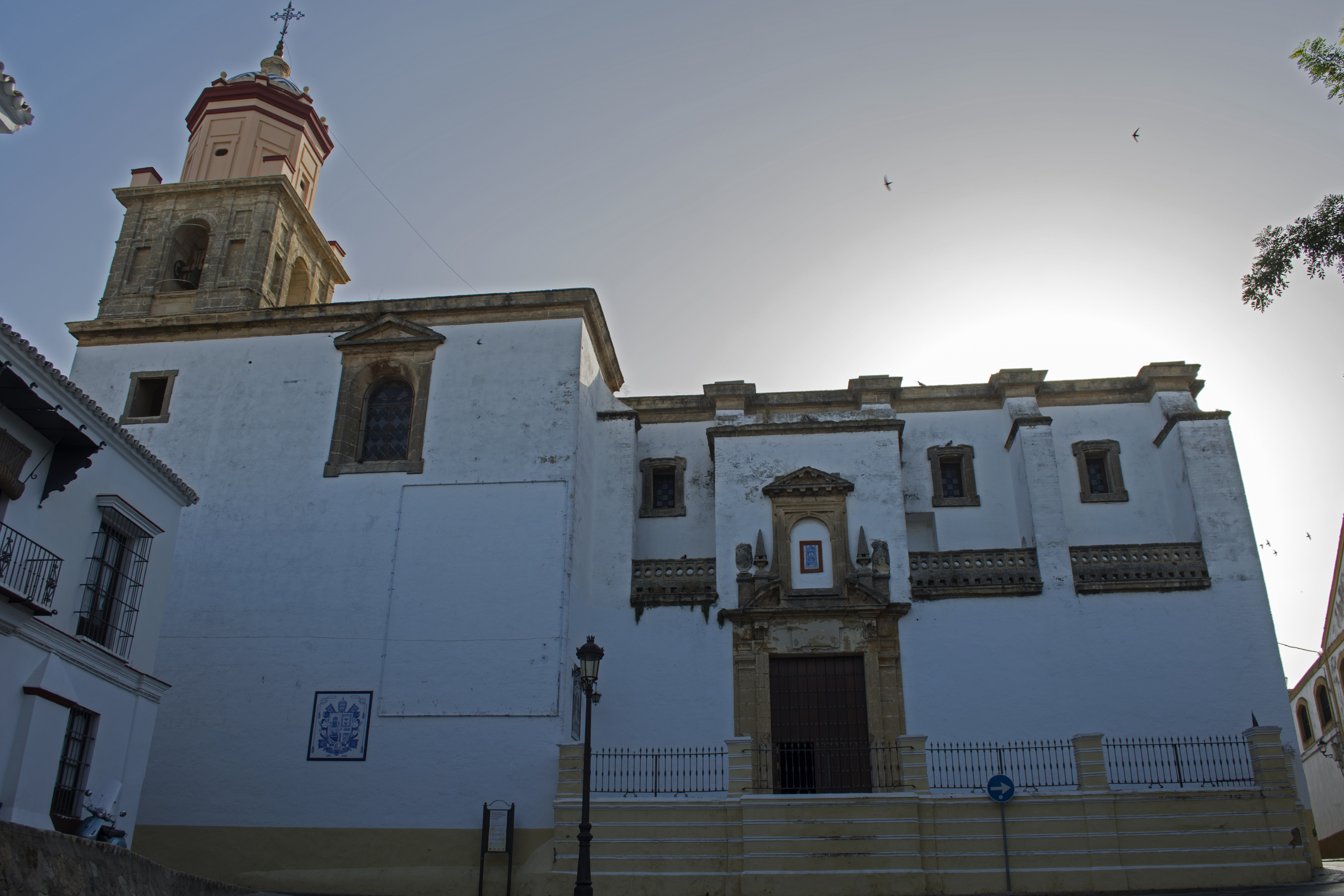
Church in Sanlúcar de Barrameda where Martínez's funeral was held.

Martínez died at his home on 18 December 2015 in the same town where he had been born, Sanlúcar de Barrameda in the Province of Cádiz. He was 79 years old, and had been fighting cancer for several months. His funeral was held the next day at Sanlúcar's Basilica of Our Lady of Charity (Basílica de Nuestra Señora de la Caridad). On hand for Martínez's sendoff were many fellow bullfighters, such as Paco Ojeda, Juan José Padilla, Marismeño, Juan Montiel, Pepín Vega, and Campuzano, among others. Also paying respects at the ceremony were bull breeders (ganaderos) like the Miura Brothers and Álvaro Domecq, along with bullfighting businessmen like Simón Casas, Nacho Lloret, and Carmelo García. "Another great gate awaits him in heaven," the parish priest holding the Mass, Juan Jacinto del Castillo, told those gathered at the church, alluding to the great gates at the bullrings, where a bullfighter can be honoured for a job well done by being borne out of the bullring raised upon shoulders. Martínez went to this church to pray to the patron saint of Charity.

Despite the great number of people who came to Martínez's funeral, no funerary chapel was set up beforehand for mourners to pay their respects in the days leading up to the actual church service, and no procession bore his coffin shoulder-high for one last lap round the fighting ground inside the town's bullring.

== Style ==
What bullfighting critics had to say about Martínez was, all in all, positive. Mundotoro says of him "He was a sober bullfighter who handled tricks with elegance and power. This combination of plasticity and mastery earned him great respect among fans." ABC called him a very elegant bullfighter with great courage.

A tribute to him in El Mundo had more to say about him:

José Martínez Limeño cut a splendid figure as a bullfighter. Tall, elegant, he was the manly archetype of the unmistakable personality of a bullfighter and, after his retirement, he was recognized walking around Seville or his native Sanlúcar. "There goes a bullfighter," people would say with admiration. He always had the good manners of the bullfighters from the so-called Cádiz "corner", once an inexhaustible source of distinguished bullfighters such as Miguelín from Algeciras, Rafael Ortega in San Fernando, Mondeño from Puerto Real, and not to mention from Jerez, such as Rafael de Paula, Luis Parra Jerezano, and more recently, Francisco Ruiz Miguel, Julio Vega Marismeño, José Luis Parada, and Paco Ojeda. A sober bullfighter, he fought with elegance and once outside the bullring he acted as an inspector for the businessman Simón Casas, a role he carried out with great worth until this last season, and in which he earned the admiration of all those who live the world of bullfighting intensely.

Bullfighting critic Paco Aguado, in his book Figuras del siglo XX ("Figures of the 20th Century"), also heaped praise on "Limeño":

It was always with elegance, with the poise of his figure and the stillness of his stance, not with fuss or displays of pretended bravery, that the man from Sanlúcar earned himself that seal of approval as a solvent "specialist" in tough bullfights, especially at the Maestranza, where his name was forever linked to that of the Miura bullfights: he slew them during seven April Fairs, with a total balance of eleven cut ears. (...) Limeño, like the previous holder of his nickname, that eternal companion of the beginnings of Joselito El Gallo, did not reach great numerical heights, but only the pride of those achievements in Seville will have been enough for him to feel satisfied with a more than respectable career.

== Tributes ==
A bust of Martínez is to be found outside the bullring in his hometown, Sanlúcar de Barrameda. It was unveiled in 1985, in time to mark 25 years since he had taken his alternativa.
