= Curro Romero =

Spanish bullfighter (born 1933)

Excelentísimo Señor Curro Romero
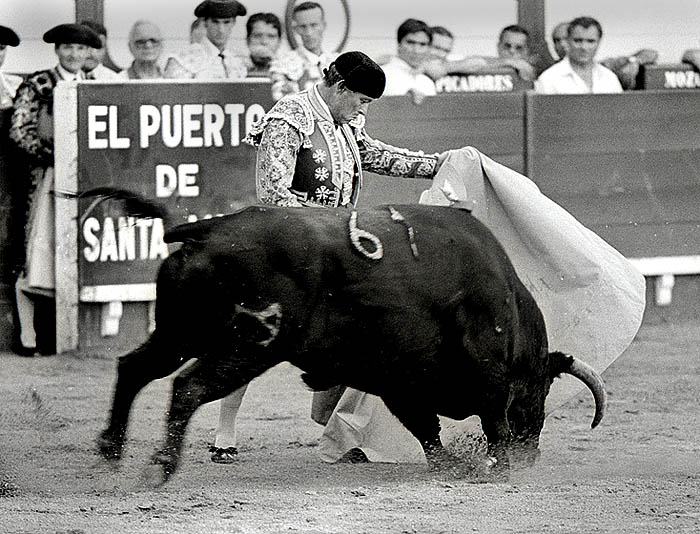
- Romero fighting a Núñez del Cuvillo bull at the El Puerto de Santa María bullring.

Personal information
- Nickname: El Faraón de Camas
- Nationality: Spanish
- Born: Francisco Romero López; 1 December 1933 (age 92) Camas, Seville, Spain
- Monuments: Statue at la Maestranza, Seville
- Home town: Camas, Seville, Spain
- Occupation: Bullfighter
- Years active: 1954–1999
- Agent: José Brageli; Antonio Chaves; Manuel Cisneros Lacruz; José Ignacio Sánchez Mejías apoderados
- Spouses: Concha Márquez Piquer; Carmen Tello Barbadillo
- Children: Concha Romero Márquez; Coral Romero Márquez (d. 1986)
- Parents: Francisco Romero Velázquez (father); Andrea López Expósito (mother)
- Relatives: María Romero López (sister); Buendía Romero López (sister)
- Website: http://www.curro-romero.com/

Francisco Romero López (Spanish: [fɾanˈθisko roˈmeɾo ˈlopeθ]; born 1 December 1933), better known as Curro Romero (Spanish: [ˈkuro roˈmeɾo]), and nicknamed El Faraón de Camas ("The Pharaoh of Camas"), is a Spanish bullfighter. He began his professional career in his hometown's La Pañoleta neighbourhood on 22 August 1954, together with José Martínez Limeño.

== Early life ==
Curro Romero was born on 1 December 1933 (although at least one source says 4 December 1933) in the Andalusian town of Camas into a very humble family. There, Romero lived at his uncle's house on the Calle de la Cruz, a narrow little laneway that was cold and damp. His father, who was a fancier of flamenco as well as bullfighting, worked at the fish market, spending nights in the Barranco de la Pañoleta ("Headscarf Gully") gathering and preparing fish. His mother Andrea worked, too, at Mr. Barea's olive warehouse. Despite the drawbacks of living in this way, however, neither he nor his sisters (the elder one María; the younger one Buendía) ever went hungry. Romero himself recalls with fondness the dishes of stew and scad that their mother would make them. He learnt to make do with what they had, which was rather little.

From his father, Romero learnt about bullfighting, although in the elder Romero's case, it was "armchair bullfighting", as young Curro's father never gathered the courage to put himself before a bull, preferring to enjoy the pursuit vicariously. Nevertheless, Romero chose the path of bullfighting. His father also had a passion for flamenco, and Romero learnt about that, too.

Romero was barely 12 years old when he gave up school where, by his own words, he was not learning anything from his "observation post in the back row". Necessity, of course, forced him to go out to work as a shepherd, watching over cows, sheep, and swine on Gonzalo Queipo de Llano's cortijo, which lay on the River Guadalquivir. This work brought him each day 7½ pesetas, and a loaf of bread besides, along with a few chickpeas. He quit this job before long, because he did not like being ordered around, nor being manhandled.

It was during Romero's time at this farm, though, listening to the "olés" that reached him from the bullring in Seville on windy days (the Maestranza was less than 3 km away), when he found his true calling, and the "bullfighting games" that he played at home, before the mirror, with whatever cloth or rag he could find, may well have set him on the path to what he would soon become. Romero himself believes that if not for the treatment he got at Queipo de Llano's farm for almost two years, he might never have seriously considered becoming a bullfighter.

Romero's path into bullfighting was afforded him by his paternal grandmother, María, who knew a pharmacist in nearby Seville, named Dr. Maravillas Bocio. She dealt with him in antiques, and managed to get young Curro a job as an errand boy. This job came along with a bicycle, which Maravillas also let him use to go and see the bullfights, knowing as he did of his young employee's dream of being a bullfighter. He not only went to see bullfights, but also went to the inns in town, also frequented by some cuadrilla members, where he shared his passion for Betis, the team of his dreams.

== Bullfighting career ==
Romero's first experience in tauromachy came at the age of thirteen when he found himself before a heifer belonging to Don Juan Conradi's bull farm.

Romero's début without picadores marked his entry into professional bullfighting. This came on 22 August 1954, in his very own hometown, Camas, at the bullring in the neighbourhood of La Pañoleta, alternating with José Martínez Limeño. Romero first fought bulls with horses in Utrera on 8 September 1954, with Juan Gálvez and Francisco Corpas, with bull calves from the Ruperto de los Reyes ranch. On this occasion, Romero was substituting for Juan Antonio Romero. Romero's début at the Las Ventas bullring in Madrid came on 18 July 1957, with bulls supplied by the Alipio Pérez-Tabernero ranch; Adolfo Aparicio and Vázquez II were also on the bill for this appearance.

In 1957, Romero also presented himself as a novillero (novice bullfighter who fights bull calves) at the Maestranza in Seville, alternating with Antonio Romero and José Trincheira, fighting yearlings from the Benítez Cubero ranch. This particular corrida will always be remembered by aficionados because the spectators wanted Romero to do another walk round the bullfighting ground. This was made somewhat awkward by the next bull calf after his having been released into said bullfighting ground. So, he did his walk round the arena in the callejón (the row just behind the barrier, used by those directly involved in the bullfighting). He was also borne shoulder-high out through the Prince's Gate after cutting two ears at this corrida.

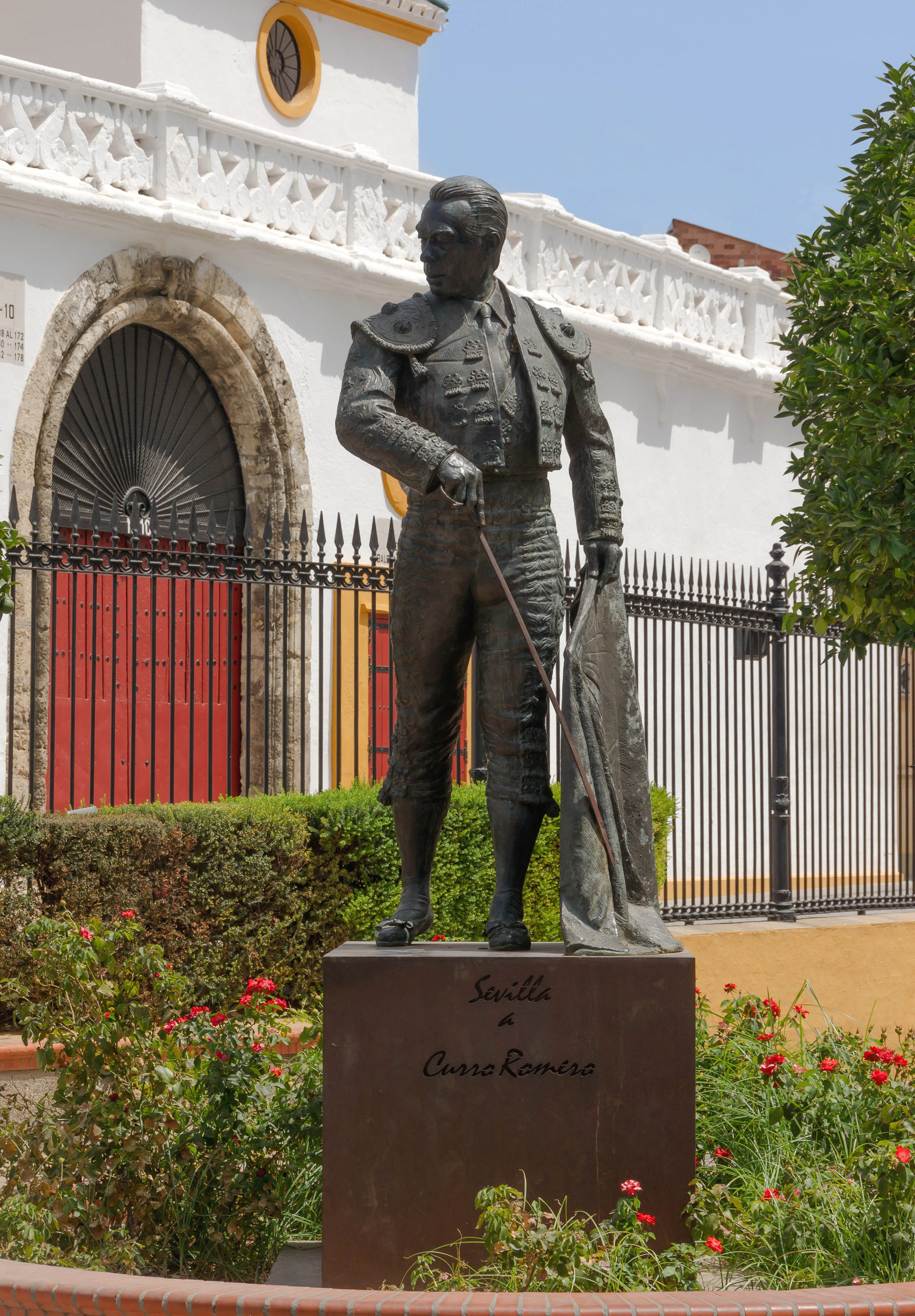
Bronze statue of Curro Romero outside Seville's Maestranza bullring, by sculptor Sebastián Santos Calero, unveiled in 2001.

On 18 March 1959, Romero took his alternativa from his "godfather" Gregorio Sánchez at the Valencia bullring. Bearing witness was Jaime Ostos. The bull fought for the occasion was named Vito and came from the Conde de la Corte ranch. He received "applause" for his performance with Vito, and "applause" for his performance with the other bull allotted to him that afternoon. Nevertheless, he was not truly successful that day, and even received one warning.

Only a couple of months later, however, on 19 May 1959, Romero saw his alternativa confirmed at Las Ventas. Standing as "godfather" this time was Pepe Luis Vázquez Garcés and bearing witness was Manolo Vázquez. The Eusebia Galache ranch supplied the bull, named Lunito, weighing 496 kg. Romero got "silence" for this fight. Once again, something went awry to mar the occasion: the corrida was rained out and an end had to be put to the festivities during the afternoon's third bull (there are usually six bulls at a corrida). Romero appeared at this corrida substituting for Miguel Mateo "Miguelín".

On 23 January 1960, Romero had his début in Latin America's bullrings when he appeared at Manizales, Colombia, alternating with Luis Miguel Dominguín and Pepe Cáceres. The Don Carlos Núñez ranch supplied the bulls that they fought.

Romero's alternativa was also confirmed at the Plaza de Toros México in Mexico City on 24 February 1963. Standing as "godfather" then was Humberto Moro, while Joselito Huerta bore witness. Bulls, including Tablajero, the 446-kilogramme beast used in the confirmation, were supplied by the La Laguna ranch. Romero received "applause" for his performance with Tablajero, and "ovation" for his fight with the other bull allotted to him that afternoon.

Romero was borne shoulder-high out through the Prince's Gate at the Maestranza in Seville on five occasions (and on one further occasion, he refused the honour):

- 19 June 1960 — alternating with Manolo González and Jaime Ostos, fighting bulls from the Clemente Tassara ranch;
- 19 May 1966 — lone bullfighter fighting six bulls from the Carlos Urquijo ranch;
- 24 April 1967 — alternating with Rafael Peralta, Miguel Báez "Litri", and Jaime Ostos, fighting bulls from the Carlos Urquijo ranch;
- 13 June 1968 — lone bullfighter fighting six bulls from the Carlos Núñez (3), Antonio Pérez (2), and Clemente Tassara (1) ranches;
- 29 May 1972 — lone bullfighter fighting six bulls and reaping three ears, then refusing to be borne on shoulders;
- 19 April 1980 — alternating with José Mari Manzanares and Juan Antonio Ruiz "Espartaco", fighting bulls from the Carlos Núñez ranch.

One of Romero's most outstanding appearances at Seville was the second in this list, at which he cut eight ears from six bulls, becoming the bullfighter to have cut off the most bull's ears in one afternoon in the Maestranza's history.

As great as Romero's success at the Maestranza was, it was arguably greater at Las Ventas. He was borne on shoulders out through the Great Gate there seven times during his bullfighting years (and likewise, on one occasion, he refused the honour):

- 20 September 1959 — alternating with Pepe Luis Vázquez and Manolo Vázquez, fighting bulls from the Carlos Juan Antonio Álvarez García ranch (cut 1 ear);
- 4 July 1963 — alternating with César Girón, Pedro Martínez "Pedrés", and Curro Girón, fighting bulls from the Alipio Pérez-Tabernero Sanchón ranch (cut 2 ears);
- 24 May 1965 — alternating with Manuel Benítez "El Cordobés" and Manuel Amador, fighting bulls from the Carlos Núñez ranch (cut 1 ear);
- 28 May 1966 — alternating with Antonio Bienvenida in a mano a mano, (Note: A mano a mano is a bullfighting event at which there are only two bullfighters on the bill rather than the usual three.) fighting bulls from the Antonio Pérez de San Fernando ranch (cut 2 ears);
- 7 July 1966 — alternating with Antonio Bienvenida and Antonio Chenel "Antoñete", fighting bulls from the Carlos Núñez ranch (cut 2 ears);
- 26 May 1967 — alternating with Diego Puerta and Paco Camino, fighting bulls from the José Benítez Cubero ranch (cut 2 ears);
- 24 May 1973 — alternating with Manuel Sebastián "Palomo Linares" and Curro Rivera, fighting bulls from the José Benítez Cubero (4) and Juan Marí Pérez Tabernero Montalvo (2) ranches (cut 2 ears but refused to be borne out on shoulders).

It was on the day before the sixth occasion in this list that Romero was treated rather differently. It was Saint Isidore's Fair (Feria de San Isidro), a major bullfighting celebration, and Romero refused to slay one of the bulls from the Cortijoliva ranch that had been presented to him, claiming that it had already been fought. This was a serious enough misdeed in Francoist Spain to warrant detention at the General Security Delegation — jail, that is to say. He apparently was not there long.

On 30 August 1985, Romero was to appear at the Colmenar Viejo bullring, but withdrew for medical reasons, leading the organizers to appoint José Cubero Sánchez instead. This was very fateful, for Cubero was killed by a bull that day.

Romero gave 35 alternativas. Among those whom he thus honoured were Julio Aparicio Díaz and Cristina Sánchez. There is also a monument to Romero in Seville, near the Maestranza. On 28 February 2020, he became the first bullfighter to be awarded the title of "Favourite Son of Andalusia".

By his own words, one of Romero's best faenas (series of passes before the bullfighter slays the bull) was one performed on 20 April 1967 at the Maestranza with a Benítez Cubero bull. After two "fantastic" faenas, the people there lifted him onto their shoulders and bore him out through the Prince's Gate, without him ever even cutting any ears off the bulls that he had slain.

No bullfighter gets through his career without suffering at least a few injuries, and Romero was no exception. He was badly gored on nine occasions:

- Algeciras, 19 June 1962;
- La Línea, 15 July 1962;
- Zafra, 5 October 1962;
- Palma de Mallorca, 11 August 1963;
- Almería, 24 August 1965;
- Madrid, 16 May 1968;
- Málaga, 17 September 1972;
- Puerto de Santa María, 18 July 1983;
- Aranjuez, 9 June 1989.

== Style ==
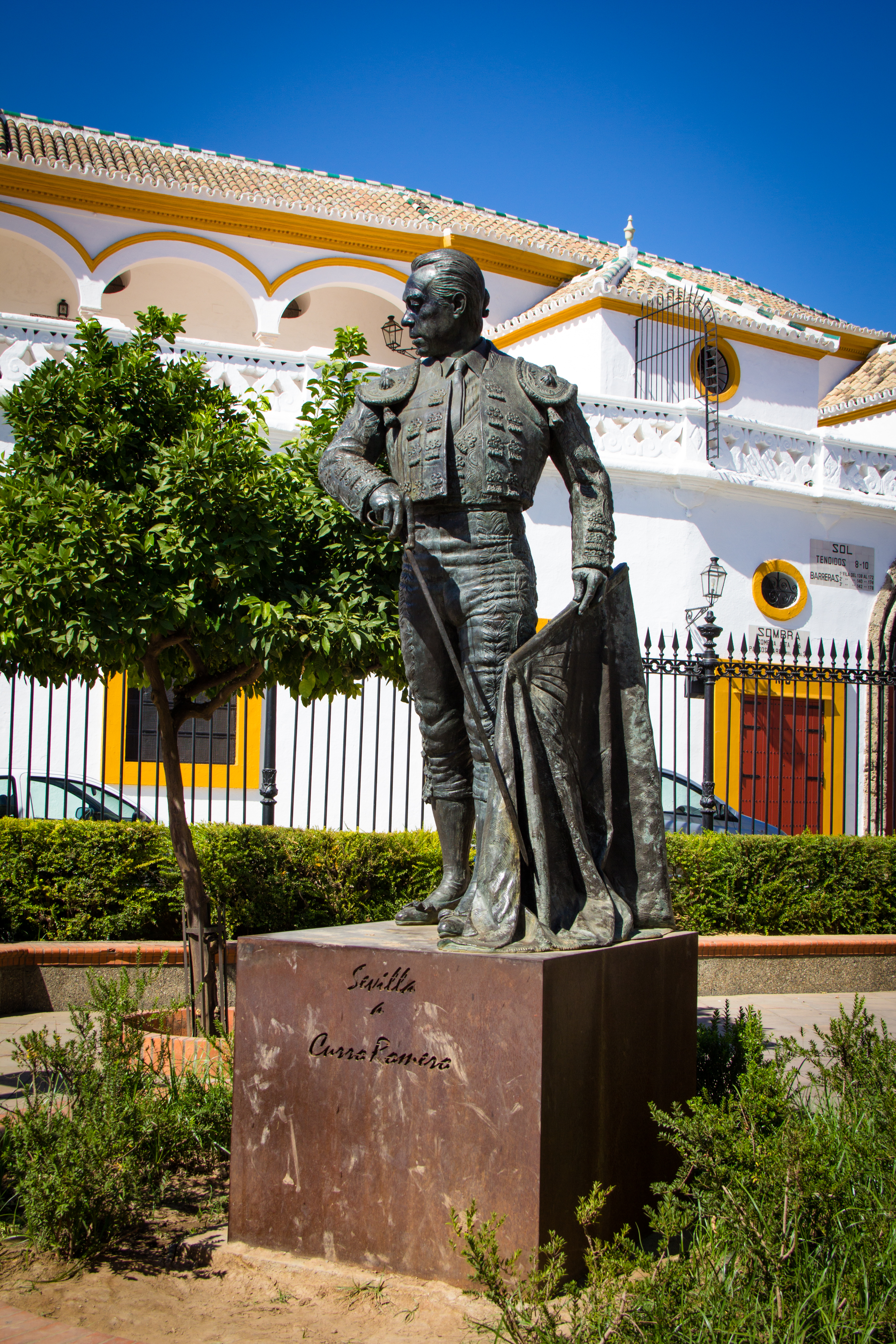
Another view of Sebastián Santos Calero's statue of Curro Romero.

Romero's bullfighting was "an inspiration to the best critics", according to the bullfighting critic Antonio Díaz Cañabate. He further praised Romero's style by saying "Curro Romero woke up and his awakening was so bright that the dusk seemed like a dawn. The dawn of pure bullfighting...", and also "Curro Romero came to the Seville Fair and the elf (Note: The word in the original Spanish text here is duende, and it might also be translated "spirit", rather than "elf".) came with him, hidden in the bewitched cape, in the muleta. And it was not Curro Romero. The elf was the one that fought bulls." Whether he had wonderful or dreadful afternoons, though, his fans always backed him wholeheartedly. Díaz Cañabate once even went as far as to liken watching Romero's style of bullfighting to enjoying good sherry.

== Retirement ==
With roughly 900 corridas fought in his career, Romero bid farewell to the bullrings at a festival held in La Algaba, Seville, on 22 October 2000, at which he cut three ears. Nevertheless, the last time when he donned the suit of lights was in Murcia, on 10 September 2000, a corrida at which he alternated with Julián López El Juli and Pepín Jiménez, fighting bulls supplied by the Luis Algarra ranch.

Romero's professional career has been one of the longest ever known, alternating between epic afternoons and the greatest failures, and, as with José Gómez Ortega and Juan Belmonte, dividing fandom between those aficionados who thought he could do no wrong (curristas), and those who never had a kind word for him (anticurristas). He retired at the age of 66, after forty-two years of professional activity. He is a recognized follower of Real Betis Balompié and was a friend of the flamenco singer Camarón de la Isla.

On 3 March 2001, a jury made up of reporters and bullfighting fans included Romero in its list of the 20th century's ten most important bullfighters; he shares this list with the following practitioners of tauromachy: José Gómez "Joselito", Pepe Luis Vázquez, Juan Belmonte, Domingo Ortega, Manolete, Antonio Bienvenida, Antonio Ordóñez, Paco Camino, and El Viti.

== Private life ==
On 26 October 1962, at Madrid's Church of Saint Jerome the Royal, Romero wed the singer Concha Márquez Piquer, singer and actress Concha Piquer's daughter, with whom he had two daughters, Concha and Coral, the latter of whom died in an accident in the United States in 1986. He divorced his first wife in 1982. On 16 February 2003, he wed Carmen Tello Barbadillo (born 16 October 1955) in a civil ceremony in Espartinas.

In a ruling in a labour dispute, the magistrate Don Santiago Romero, president of the Chamber of Social Matters of the Superior Tribunal of Justice of Andalusia, defined "Currism" (or currismo in Spanish) as "a feeling that is undoubtedly and notoriously altruistic in favour of the bullfighter, deep and rooted like no other, creator of a permanent illusion, of unconditional hope and of a way of understanding life."

After his first wife's death on 18 October 2021, Romero could marry Carmen Tello with the Church's blessing, and did so in the chapel at the Casa de Pilatos on 18 December 2022.

=== Health ===
Romero's retirement has not been uneventful where medical events are concerned. In 2020, at the height of the coronavirus pandemic, Romero had a laryngeal tumour that needed treatment. An operation would have left him voiceless; so he underwent radiotherapy instead. The tumour has apparently disappeared, after 38 radiotherapy treatments. He recuperated at home.

In May 2024, when he was 90 years old, he had to be hospitalized and undergo surgery after a household accident broke his hip. He was, however, soon convalescing at home, with his wife's help.

== Distinctions ==
Romero has received, among other honours, the following, which entitle him to be known by the honorific Excelentísimo Señor:

- 1993, Medal of Andalusia, awarded in recognition of actions, services and exceptional or extraordinary merit achieved by persons or entities that are a manifestation of work and solidarity for the benefit of other citizens.
- 2005, named a Favourite Son of the Province of Seville.
- 1997, Gold Medal of Merit in the Fine Arts.
- 2008, Academic by the Real Academia de Bellas Artes de Santa Isabel de Hungría, Seville, the first time that the Academy granted a bullfighter such a distinction.
- 2020, Favourite Son of Andalusia.
