= Paco Camino =

Spanish bullfighter (1940–2024)

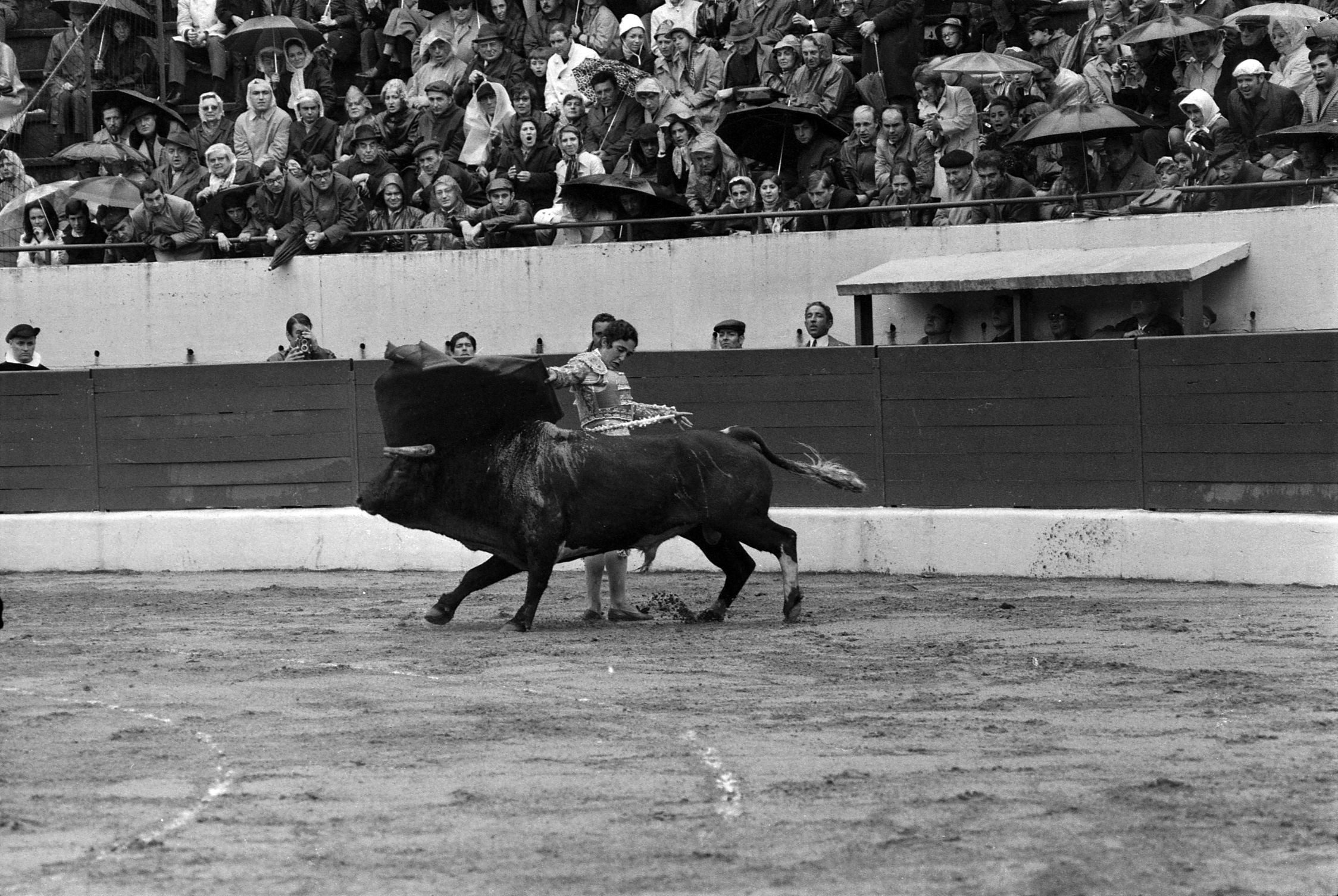
- Bullfight on 7 May 1970 at the Toulouse bullring

Personal information
- Nicknames: Paco el Niño sabio de Camas
- Nationality: Spanish
- Born: Francisco Camino Sánchez; 14 December 1940 Camas, Seville, Spain
- Died: 29 July 2024 (aged 83) Navalmoral de la Mata, Cáceres, Spain
- Resting place: Camas, Seville, Spain; 37°25′06″N 6°02′22″W
- Home town: Camas, Seville, Spain
- Occupation: Bullfighter
- Years active: 1954–1983
- Agent: Manuel Chopera (apoderado)
- Spouses: Norma Gaona; María de los Ángeles Sanz; Isabel Sánchez-Flor
- Children: Francisco Camino Gaona (d. 2023); Rafi Camino (b. 1969); Mariam Camino (b. 1971); Francisco Javier Camino (b. 1973)
- Father: Rafael Camino
- Relatives: Joaquín Camino Sánchez (1943–1973; brother); Rafael Camino Sánchez (brother)
- Other interests: Spanish Fighting Bull husbandry

Francisco Camino Sánchez (Spanish: [fɾanˈθisko kaˈmino ˈsantʃeθ]; 14 December 1940 – 29 July 2024), known in the bullfighting world as Paco Camino (Spanish: [ˈpako kaˈmino]), was a Spanish bullfighter and bull breeder. A bullfighter of the highest order, he dominated tauromachy and was twelve times borne shoulder-high out through the Great Gate at Las Ventas in Madrid, a record bested only by Santiago Martín Sánchez ("El Viti").

== Early life ==
Camino's association with bullfighting went all the way back to his baptism, at which he was covered with a capote de paseo. (Note: A capote de paseo is a special kind of decorative, ceremonial cape worn by a bullfighter with his suit of lights at such ceremonial occasions as the paseíllo; it is not used in bullfights.) Furthermore, Camino's father was the former novillero Rafael Camino ("Rafaelillo de Camas"), who accompanied him for a while as a banderillero. He was nicknamed "el Niño sabio de Camas" ("The Wise Child from Camas") for his precocity in the art of bullfighting. This byname was given him by the bullfighting critic Antonio Díaz-Cañabate.

Before giving himself over wholly to bullfighting, Camino was an employee at a baker's oven.

== Bullfighting career ==
Camino first donned the suit of lights at the age of 14 (13 by one source) at Cumbres Mayores, Huelva in 1954, alternating with Diego Puerta.

Camino made his début with picadores on 7 September 1958 at the Zaragoza bullring with bulls supplied by the Francisco Escudero Muriel ranch, sharing billing with the Portuguese bullfighter José Júlio, and with Mariano Tirapo "Chiquito de Aragón". He cut three ears at this event, and was borne shoulder-high out through the Great Gate.

Camino took his alternativa at the Valencia bullring on 17 March 1959. Standing as "godfather" was Jaime Ostos, while Juan García Jiménez ("Mondeño") bore witness. The bull used in the ceremony was named Mandarín, and came from the Antonio y Carlos Urquijo de Federico ranch. That afternoon, he cut one ear from each of the two bulls that he fought.

On 18 July 1959, Camino shared billing with Rafael Soto "Rafael de Paula" and Juan Vázquez at the Maestranza in Seville as they fought bulls supplied by the Pérez de la Concha ranch. Camino left both his bulls earless, four ears being quite a prize for a young bullfighter.

Since he was a boy, Camino had admired Antonio Ordóñez, with whom he appeared as a matador at a mano a mano (a bullfighting event at which there are only two bullfighters on the bill rather than the usual three) on 28 July 1960 in Valencia. His presentation as a matador at the Maestranza in Seville on 19 April 1961 likewise included Ordóñez on the bill, along with his alternativa witness, Mondeño. The bulls that they fought were from the Hermanos Peralta ranch.

Camino received confirmation of his alternativa at Las Ventas on 12 May 1961. Standing as "godfather" this time was Julio Aparicio Martínez, and bearing witness was José María Clavel (who was at the bullring that day to fill in for fellow bullfighter Antonio Borrero Morano "Chamaco"). The bull for the confirmation was named Espejito, from the Antonio Pérez de San Fernando ranch. On 22 August 1961, Camino suffered a very serious goring after entering the bullfighting ground to slay Cardiaco, an Atanasio Fernández crossbreed bull, at the Vista Alegre bullring in Bilbao, and performing the volapié, the usual way in Spanish-style bullfighting of delivering the estocada (the sword thrust meant to kill the bull). Camino was quickly taken to the bullring's infirmary, where he received Extreme Unction. He was given the same sacrament nineteen years later, in Aranjuez, when he was once again seriously gored.

Camino had nonetheless recovered sufficiently by 24 May 1962 for him to take part in the ceremony to confirm José Martínez Limeño's alternativa; he bore witness while Diego Puerta stood as "godfather". Bulls were supplied by the Antonio Pérez de San Fernando ranch.

Camino also received confirmation of his alternativa in Mexico. This took place at the Plaza de Toros México in Mexico City on 16 December 1962. Standing as "godfather" then was Antonio Velázquez, while Humberto Moro bore witness. The José Julián Llaguno ranch supplied the bulls, including Recuerdo, the bull used in the confirmation. He cut one ear on this occasion.

Camino led the escalafón taurino (bullfighters' rankings) in 1963, the year when he first found himself being borne out through the Great Gate at Las Ventas, and in 1966. In this latter year, he was represented by the Chopera family and starred in the bullfighting film Fray Torero, directed by José Luis Sáenz de Heredia. On 29 October 1967, he presented himself at the Plaza de toros de Acho in Lima, where he refused to slay the afternoon's fifth bull, for which kindness the authorities decreed that he should be taken to prison and held for 24 hours.

In his twenty bullfighting seasons as a matador, Camino fought in 1,490 corridas, cutting 1,176 ears and 126 tails as he went. He fought bulls on more than fifty afternoons at Las Ventas in Madrid alone, reaping 48 ears and being borne on his fellow bullfighters' shoulders out through the Great Gate twelve times, on these dates (listed along with the accomplishments that earned Camino these acts of recognition):

- 18 May 1963 — He left one bull from the Francisco Galache de Hernandinos ranch earless, and cut one further ear;
- 18 May 1967 — He cut three ears from bulls supplied by the Juan Pedro Domecq ranch;
- 26 May 1967 — One bull from the José Benítez Cubero ranch yielded both ears;
- 13 May 1968 — He reaped three ears from bulls supplied by the Antonio Pérez Angoso and Antonio Pérez de San Fernando ranches;
- 16 May 1969 — He left a bull from the Baltasar Ibán Valdés ranch without ears;
- 4 June 1970 — He appeared at this corrida as the lone matador and slew seven bulls, reaping not only eight ears, but also one ovation and one round of applause; the seven bulls were supplied by the Juan Pedro Domecq, Joaquín Buendía, Felipe Bartolomé Sanz, Eduardo Miura Fernández, Urquijo, and Manuel Arranz ranches; he was awarded a reserve bull (a sobrero);
- 29 May 1971 — He came away with both one bull's ears; the bull was from Pablo Romero's sons' ranch;
- 23 May 1972 — The Manuel Arranz ranch's bulls yielded three ears to him;
- 21 May 1973 — He reaped three ears from bulls supplied by the Juan Pedro Domecq ranch;
- 6 June 1974 — He left one of the Joaquín Buendía ranch's bulls earless;
- 22 May 1975 — He got both ears from a bull that came from the El Jaral de la Mira ranch;
- 24 May 1976 — The bulls supplied by the Baltasar Ibán Valdés ranch yielded three ears to him.

These twelve trips out through the gate at the bullfighting world's foremost bullring put Camino behind only El Viti in the number of times that this honour has been bestowed, and just ahead of Antonio Bienvenida. He sustained some thirty gorings, two of which were life-threatening, in Bilbao in 1961 and at Aranjuez in 1980.

On 4 June 1970, Camino starred in a memorable charitable bullfight, slaying seven bulls by himself and cutting eight ears.

Camino definitively retired from the bullrings at Valladolid on 23 September 1983. He donned the suit of lights for the last time at Nîmes, in 1987, to give his son, Rafi Camino, his alternativa.

== Later life ==
Camino was awarded the Gold Medal of Merit in the Fine Arts in 2005. This same year, he underwent a successful liver transplant after having been on the waiting list for more than two years. From 1996 onwards, he was linked to the bullfighting world through his bull ranch, Los Camino.

== Personal life ==
Camino's brother, Joaquín Camino Sánchez, a subalterno on his bullfighting team (cuadrilla), was killed on 3 June 1973 at La Monumental in Barcelona when a bull named Curioso from the Atanasio Fernández ranch gored him.

Camino wed three times. His first marriage came in November 1963; the bride was Norma Gaona, Plaza de Toros México businessman Alfonso Gaona de Lara's daughter. They agreed to live in Spain, but only two years later, they chose to separate, as Norma (described by one writer as being "of volcanic character") was not adapting at all well to life far from her homeland, Mexico. The couple had one son, Francisco, who also later ventured into the bullfighting world. Francisco, however, died of cancer in 2023.

Camino's next marriage was to the Madrileña María de los Ángeles Sanz, said to be Norma's "polar opposite", whom he met in the late 1960s. She was an agricultural technical engineer. They had to wait until 1973, though, before they could get married in the Church's eyes, as it took that long for Camino to secure a dissolution of his marriage to his first wife. In the meantime, he and María had had three children, Rafi (in 1969), Mariam (in 1971) and Francisco Javier (1973). To all appearances, theirs was a stable marriage; so news of their separation in 1989 came as a surprise. It turned out that Camino had fallen in love with a woman, 17 years younger than himself, from La Mancha, by the name of Isabel Sánchez-Flor, the daughter of a wealthy clothing businessman. They were married in a civil ceremony in Valencia in 1994.

Camino was father to four children, among them Rafi Camino, who is likewise a bullfighter.

== Death and tributes ==
Camino died on 29 July 2024 in Navalmoral de la Mata in the Extremaduran province of Cáceres at the age of 83. His health had taken a turn for the worse and he had been hospitalized.

The town council in Camino's birthplace, Camas, in the Andalusian province of Seville, observed a minute's silence and declared a day of mourning in memory of an "emblematic figure". Camas would also open its council chamber as a capilla ardiente (literally "burning chapel", a chapel of rest) where Camino could lie in repose so that family and friends could bid their last farewells "to him who was one of bullfighting's greats".

The visitors included Álvaro Domecq Romero (a bull breeder and former rejoneador), Eduardo Dávila Miura, brothers José Antonio and Tomás Campuzano (all matadors), David Domínguez (a banderillero), Lolo de Camas (a picador), and Curro Romero, a former bullfighter who was ninety years old by this time.

Camino's coffin was presented beneath a mantle of Our Lady of Sorrows, a devotional figure closely linked to the bullfighter.

Miguel Ángel Yáñez said of Camino "A controversial bullfighter, a highly refined stylist with the cape, magnificent with the muleta, he preferred the left to the right. Classic, confident, he gave sublime chicuelinas, (Note: The chicuelina is a bullfighting move performed with the cape by calling the bull from the front, holding the cape with both arms open, semi-extended. When the bull charges, the bullfighter turns half a turn on himself in the opposite direction to the bull's charge, in such a way that his body is wrapped in the cape, with the bull passing by on one side. This is named after the bullfighter Manuel Jiménez (1902-1967), nicknamed Chicuelo, who performed it for the first time at the Valencia bullring in 1924.) knowledgeable, intelligent; in short, a gifted bullfighter."

Consuelo Font, writing for El Mundo, offered "His refined style with the cape and the beautiful rhythm that he drew with his wrist in his natural passes earned him the fans' admiration, raising him to the top of the escalafón."

Eduardo Dávila Miura called Camino a "mythic figure" in bullfighting.

Camino was buried in Camas's municipal graveyard, where his brother Joaquín had already lain for more than half a century.

== Bibliography ==
- Abella, Carlos (1994). Paco Camino. El Mozart del toreo. Colección La Tauromaquia, Espasa-Calpe, ISBN 43437603
