= Andrés Vázquez (bullfighter) =

Spanish bullfighter (1932–2022)

Personal information
- Nickname: El Nono
- Nationality: Spanish
- Born: Andrés Mazariegos Vázquez; 25 July 1932 Villalpando, Zamora, Spain
- Died: 17 June 2022 (aged 89) Benavente, Zamora, Spain
- Resting place: Villalpando, Zamora, Spain
- Home town: Villalpando, Zamora, Spain
- Occupation: Bullfighter
- Years active: 1960–1982, 2012
- Other interests: Flamenco

Andrés Mazariegos Vázquez (Spanish: [anˈdrez maθaˈɾjeɣoz ˈβaθkeθ]; 25 July 1932 – 17 June 2022), known professionally as Andrés Vázquez "El Nono", was a Spanish bullfighter. Among his influences in tauromachy were Juan Belmonte, Domingo Ortega and Antonio Bienvenida. He was awarded the Order of Beneficence in 1975, and ten times he came out of the Great Gate at Las Ventas. He had great success fighting bulls from the Victorino ranch.

== Bullfighting career ==
Vázquez made his début with horses on 18 July 1960 in Guijuelo. His career was fraught with the sorrow of a hard beginning in the bullfighting world. "The obstacles, the dust, the hardness of the bullfights without stabbing (by picadores) in those capeas marked a path in which, above the calamities, bullfighting was found." He forged himself as a bullfighter, glimpsing success at Las Ventas, which alternated with some very hard beginnings marked by economic hardship and a goring in the leg that almost crippled him.

After much effort on Vázquez's part, and after financial hardships, he took the alternativa. He received it from maestro Gregorio Sánchez on 19 May 1962 with Mondeño (Juan García Jiménez) standing as witness, and with bulls supplied by Benítez Cubero. He came out through the Great Gate at Las Ventas on two occasions: one in 1962 and the other in 1966. Among his personal friends were Orson Welles and fellow bullfighter Antonio Ordóñez Araujo, who was his neighbour on the Calle Serrano in Madrid. On several occasions, Vázquez took the director to his hometown, Villalpando, in the province of Zamora. The documentary Orson Welles in Spain (1963) by Albert and David Maysles is about how Welles speaks to potential investors in a project to make a film about the bullfighting world that would star a bullfighter inspired by Vázquez. Vázquez himself took part in José María Forqué's film Yo he visto a la muerte ("I Have Seen Death"; 1967), which starred Luis Miguel Dominguín and Antonio Bienvenida, and in which, besides playing himself, "El Nono", as he was known from the capeas, he also appeared indulging in his other great passion: Flamenco.

On 7 October 1967, Vázquez became one of the last bullfighters to appear at A Coruña's old bullring, the other two on the bill for the charitable bullfights that day being Joaquín Bernadó and Juan García Jiménez ("Mondeño"). The bulls were supplied by Carmen González Ordóñez. A Coruña did not have another bullfighting venue until 1991.

The most significant years of Vázquez's bullfighting life were bound with the birth of Victorino Martín Andrés's bull ranch, and a highlight of which was his bullfight on 10 August 1969, in which he was substituting for Antoñete, when he cut both ears from the famous bull Baratero, which heightened his status as a bullfighter. It led to his third trip in his career out through the Great Gate.

I still dream about 'Baratero' and I imagine that his owner does too, because that was his true takeoff. Then, at the next Saint Isidore's Fair, I locked myself in, alone with six copies of the same brand and cut a further two ears off Violeto, another extraordinary bull. From that instant, I formed with Victorino a perfect duo. I slew his bulls through many seasons and he gave me satisfaction, fame, money; also a goring, which was in Salamanca in a bullfighting contest that I fought with Paco Camino and Juan José.

— La Cuna del Saber: «Baratero», el toro de Victorino que encumbró al maestro Andrés Vázquez. Interview with Andrés Vázquez, author Paco Cañamero. 16 March 2021

On 3 May 1970 at Las Ventas, Vázquez shut himself in with six bulls from Victorino Martín's ranch – the first in history to do so – marking a milestone that put him among the bullfighters who drew the aficionados' greatest interest, because he combined both the classic bullfighter's qualities and the fighting power with the most difficult bulls. Vázquez again went out through the bullring's Great Gate in 1970, three times, a merit that he shares with Paquirri (1969), Luguillano, and Carnicerito de Úbeda (1967). Besides his media verónica, he bore a powerful left, a tempered right, and an orthodox sword, techniques of a now vanished breed of bullfighter, but which in essence Vázquez still embodies. He had further trips out through the Great Gate in 1971, 1974, and 1977.

In 1975, he was awarded the Order of Beneficence.

Sculptor Luis Sanguino has made a bronze bust of Vázquez which can be seen at the Museo Taurino de Madrid (a bullfighting museum) at the Las Ventas bullring in Madrid.

== Later life and death ==
In 2012, Vázquez celebrated his eightieth birthday with a bullfight at the Zamora bullring, where he fought a yearling bull from the Victorino ranch, cutting both his ears and his tail off as trophies, and thus also becoming the first octogenarian to accomplish this feat. He appeared in Juan Figueroa's film Sobrenatural (2016; it was released under the name Supernatural in English).

Vázquez lived in Villalpando, his birthplace, until his death. He died on 17 June 2022 at the Benavente Hospital in the province of Zamora after having been admitted two months earlier for a heart attack.

== Bibliography ==
- Agapito Modroño Alonso, Andres Vazquez. Memorias de Un Torero, 2002. Edited by Modroño Alonso, Agapito. (in Spanish)
- Pedro M. Azofra,Toreros que aplaudió la mayoría: Manolete, El Litri, Chamaco, Andrés Vázquez, 1986, Graf.Pevisa) (in Spanish)
