= Victorino Martín Andrés =

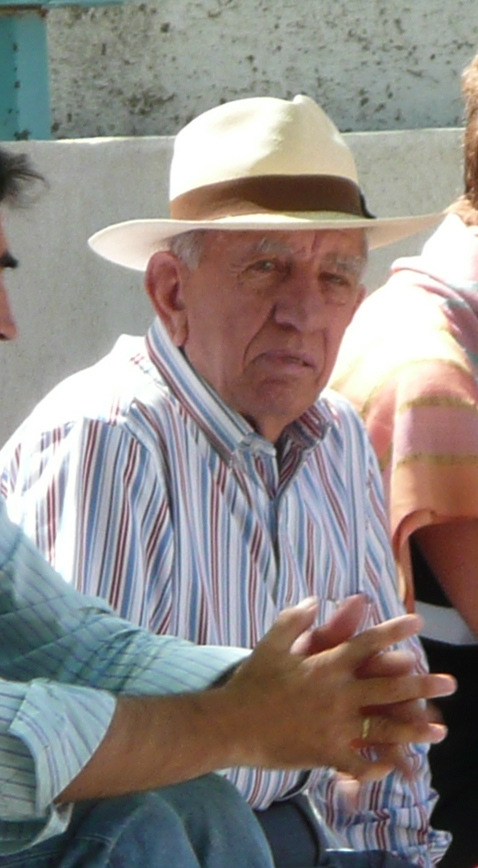
- Born: 6 March 1929; Galapagar, Spain
- Died: 3 October 2017 (aged 88); Moraleja, Spain
- Occupation: Breeder of fighting bulls
- Children: 2

Victorino Martín Andrés (6 March 1929 – 3 October 2017) was a Spanish fighting bull cattle rancher. He was born in Galapagar, 33 kilometers from the city of Madrid. The livestock of which he was owner was founded on 29 May 1919 and, together with Duke of Veragua and Miura is one of the most notable in the history of bullfighting in Spain.

== Biography ==
Until the mid of 1960s, Martín was a cattle rancher who was not well-considered and whose cattle were refused to be killed by many diestros for their ferocity, sometimes accompanied by meekness. The pardon of the bull 'Belador' in 1982 was a definite milestone in Martín's bull breeding career. It is one of the favorite cattle to be shown in the ciclos toristas de las ferias. Even more significant for his career, however, was a bullfight on 10 August 1969 at Las Ventas, featuring Baratero, a bull from his ranch, who faced matador Andrés Vázquez ("El Nono"), substituting for Antoñete. This not only breathed new life into Vázquez's then sagging career, but was also important for Martín's reputation. As a result of his performance, Vázquez was borne out through the bullring's Great Gate, and was awarded both Baratero's ears. Vázquez believed that the fight was Martín's "true takeoff" as a bull breeder; he subsequently fought many other Victorino bulls, and described himself and Martín as "a perfect duo".

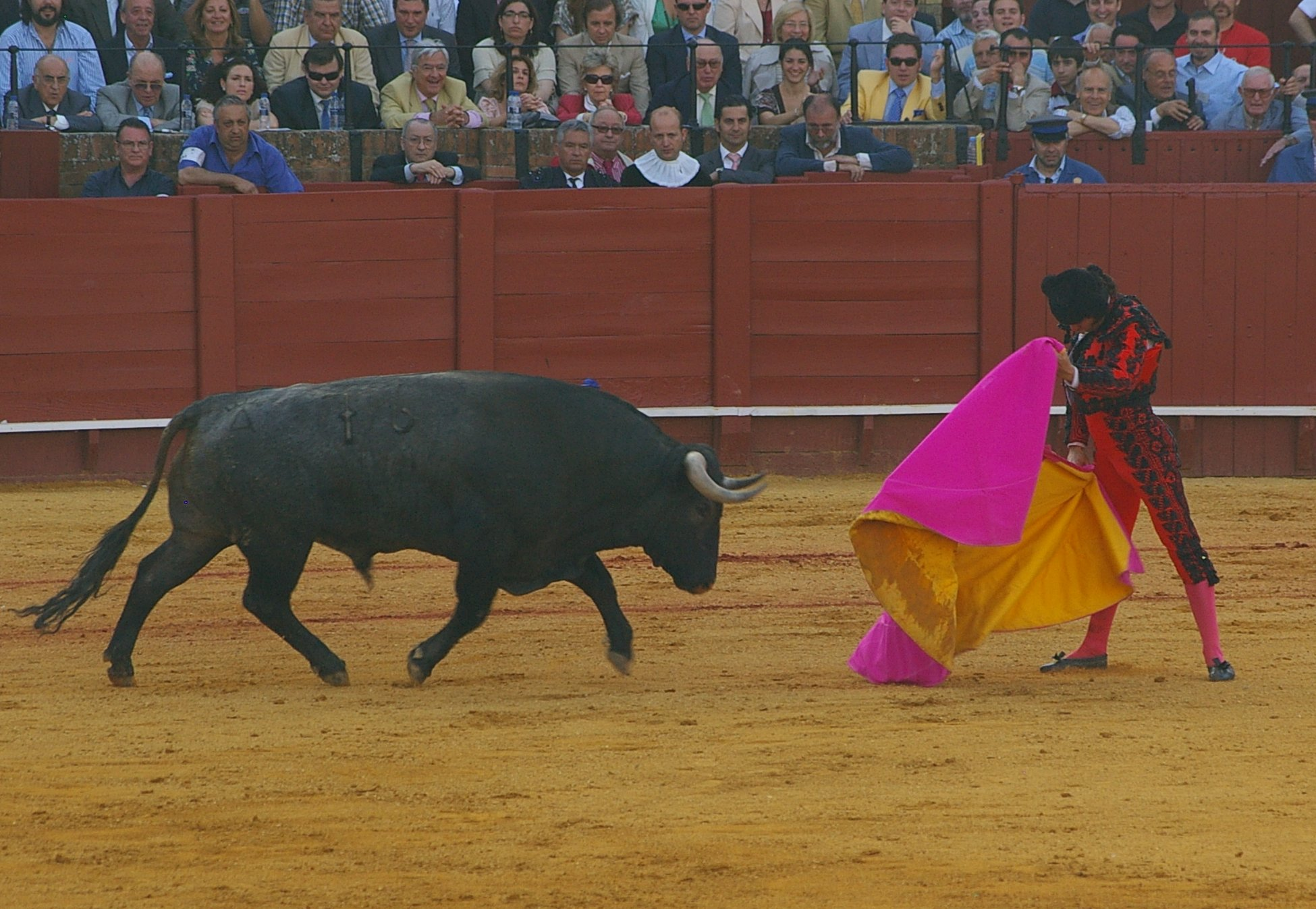
Bull of Victorino running in La Maestranza of Sevilla in 2009

Martín's son, Victorino Martín García, a veterinarian by profession, is currently in charge of directing livestock, controlling also his two other recently created hierros: 'Monteviejo' - called as one of his estates- whose encaste is from Vega- Villar, and Livestock of Urcola - of origin Urcola, after the purchase of a quarter of the cattle ranch of Francisco Galache Cobaleda, livestock of Villavieja of Yeltes, in Salamanca Province.

He received the "Grand Cross of the Order of Dos de Mayo" (Gran Cruz del Orden de Dos de Mayo) in 2011, the highest award granted by the Community of Madrid, and the Culture Prize of Community of Madrid in the category of Bullfighting in 2012. He died on 3 October 2017, at the age of 88, in his property, in the municipal term of Moraleja, Cáceres, due to a stroke.
