= Jaime Ostos =

Spanish bullfighter (1931–2022)

- Born: Jaime Ostos Carmona; 8 April 1931; Écija, Spain
- Died: 8 January 2022 (aged 90); Bogotá, Colombia
- Occupation: Bullfighter

Jaime Ostos Carmona (8 April 1931 – 8 January 2022) was a Spanish bullfighter.

== Biography ==
Ostos made his debut in Écija on 1 June 1952 alongside Bartolomé Jiménez Torres. His debut with picadors took place in Osuna on 5 April 1953 again with Torres. His bullfighting debut came on 13 October 1956 in the Plaza de Toros de Zaragoza alongside his godfather, Miguel Báez Espuny. He was awarded the Trophea Manolete in 1959.

On 29 June 1960, Ostos appeared at a corrida at the Maestranza in Seville alongside Curro Romero and José Martínez Limeño. He stood as godfather for the latter's alternativa, while the former bore witness. Bulls were laid on by the Galache ranch, including the alternativa bull, Granujillo.

He was gored by a bull while participating in a fight in Tarazona on 17 July 1963 and presumed dead. However, thanks to a blood transfusion of ten liters, he was saved. In 1974 he announced his full-time retirement, and participated in his last event in 2003.

In 1967, he was honored with an induction into the Cross with Distinctive of the Civil Order of Beneficence.

In March 2020, he was admitted to the Hospital de la Zarzuela in Madrid for being infected with COVID-19 during the beginning of the pandemic in Spain, and was discharged two months later. Ostos died of a heart attack in Bogotá on 8 January 2022, at the age of 90. He was visiting the country with his wife and a group of friends.
