= Antoñete =

Spanish bullfighter (1932–2011)

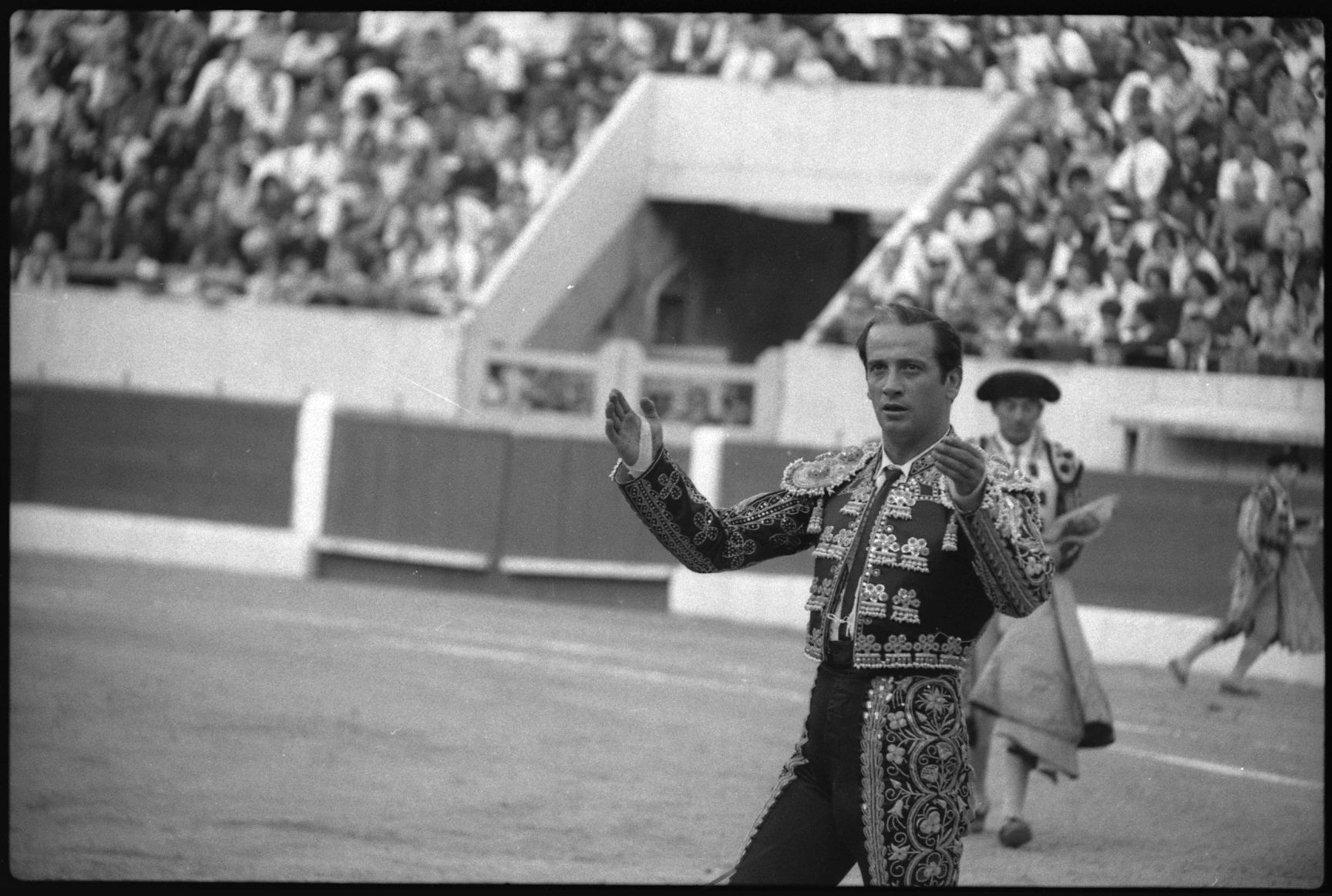
- Antoñete in 1966

Personal information
- Nickname: Antoñete
- Nationality: Spanish
- Born: Antonio Chenel Albadalejo; 24 June 1932 Madrid, Spain
- Died: 22 October 2011 (aged 79) Majadahonda, Community of Madrid, Spain
- Resting place: Our Lady of Almudena Cemetery, Madrid; 40°25′20″N 3°38′39″W
- Monuments: Roundabout in Barajas; Copa Chenel (bullfighting trophy)
- Home town: Madrid
- Occupation: Bullfighter
- Years active: 1949–2001
- Agent: Ignacio Sánchez Mejías; Manolo Chopera (apoderados)
- Spouses: Pilar López Quesada; Karina Bocos
- Children: Antonio; Pastora; Almudena; Carlos; Luis; Pilar (surnames Chenel López); Marco Antonio (surnames Chenel Bocos)
- Parent: Francisco Chenel (father)
- Relatives: Carmen (sister); Paco Parejo (brother-in-law)

Antonio Chenel Albadalejo (Spanish: [anˈtonjo tʃeˈnel alβaðaˈlexo]; 24 June 1932 – 22 October 2011), professionally and popularly known as Antoñete (Spanish: [antoˈɲete]), was a Spanish bullfighter. His family had no background in bullfighting beyond Antoñete's father having been a monosabio (a picador's assistant).

Antoñete himself explained that his maternal surname should really be Albaladejo, rather than Albadalejo. The transposition of two of the letters in this name arose from bureaucratic carelessness when his National Identity Document was issued.

== Early life ==
Born in Madrid, right near Spain's foremost bullring, Las Ventas, Antoñete spent the Spanish Civil War in the country's east once the Spanish mint had transferred its operations to Valencia; his father was a mint employee. The family later moved to Castellón de la Plana, also on the Costa del Azahar and, once the fighting was over, to Alicante. They moved back to Madrid in 1940 when Antoñete was eight years old. He suffered as a result of having a "red" father, who was both left-wing and Republican. Hungry and out on the street – the consequent malnutrition resulted in chronic bone decalcification for the boy – they had no choice but to turn to Antoñete's brother-in-law, who was the overseer at Las Ventas, Paco Parejo (whose wife was Antoñete's elder sister Carmen). He thus got to watch from an early age the bullfights with the great bullfighters of the 1940s, whom he considered his heroes, above all the ill-fated Manolete. During his childhood and adolescence, he would spend his time at the horse yard, the stables, and the bullpens at Las Ventas helping train bullfighters (by standing in for the bull) such as Agustín Parra "Parrita", Paquito Muñoz, and Manolo Navarro.

== First steps into bullfighting ==
In 1946, Antoñete gained experience at capeas in smaller towns. It was in this year that he fought and slew his first calf. A novillero between 1949 and 1952, he donned the suit of lights for the first time in 1949 in a spectacle called "Los charros mejicanos" (or "mexicanos" in some sources; "The Mexican Rustics"), organized by the company that ran Las Ventas.

Antoñete made his début with picadores on 18 February 1951 in Barcelona, alternating with Pablo Lozano and Manolo Sevilla, with bull calves furnished by the Brothers Zambrano ranch.

On 5 June 1952, Antoñete then presented himself at Las Ventas, sharing the billing with Manuel Perea "Boni" and Mariano Martín Aguilar "Carriles", and together fighting calves laid on by the ranch Don Nicasio López Navalón.

== Becoming a matador ==
Antoñete took his alternativa on 8 March 1953 in Castellón de la Plana. It was a familiar area to him as his family had sheltered there during wartime. Standing as "godfather" on this occasion was the bullfighter Julio Aparicio Martínez, while Pedro Martínez González "Pedrés" stood as the witness. The bulls for the occasion were supplied by the ranch Don Francisco Chica. The one for Antoñete's alternativa was named Carvajal.

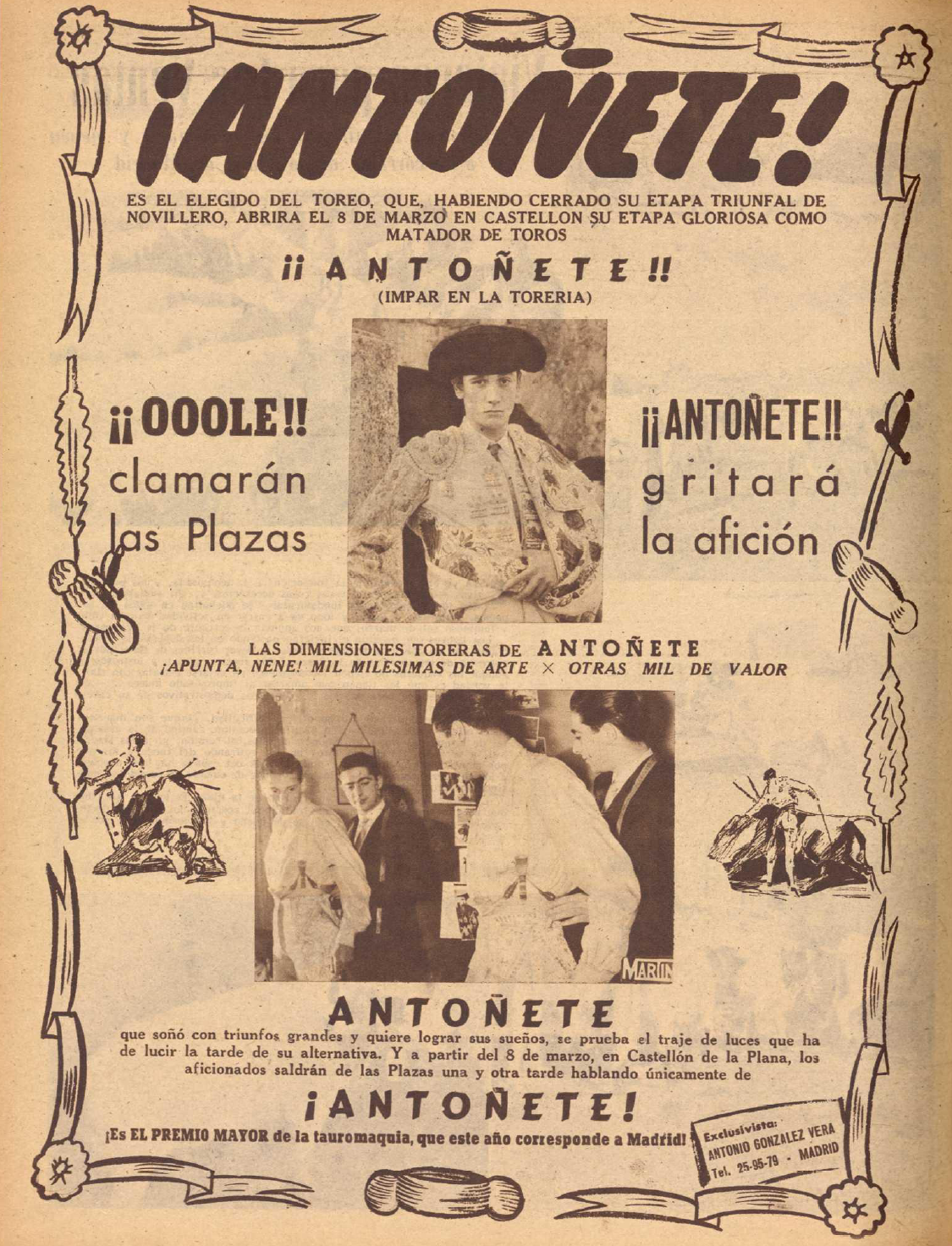
Full-page, hype-filled advertisement in the bullfighting magazine El Ruedo for Antoñete's forthcoming alternativa in Castellón

Confirmation of Antoñete's alternativa came in Madrid on 13 May of the same year. Standing as "godfather" this time was Rafael Ortega Domínguez, while Julio Aparicio Martínez bore witness. Antoñete that day at Las Ventas demonstrated an orthodox and classical style although with temper, courage and much valour, which was why he sustained quite a few serious injuries early on in his bullfighting career. The bulls for the confirmation were laid on by the ranch Don Alipio Pérez-Tabernero Sanchón; the actual confirmation bull was Rabón. Two days later, he had a great triumph at the same bullring, fighting two bulls from the Fermín Bohórquez ranch, both of which he left earless, although at least one source says that he was only awarded three ears at this corrida, but that he was also borne out through the Great Gate on shoulders. He shared billing that day with Rafael Ortega and Jorge Aguilar "El Ranchero".

On 1 July 1953, Antoñete presented himself in Portugal, at Lisbon's Campo Pequeno Bullring, where he alternated with Diamantino Vizeu, Antonio Ordóñez, and Luis Espatanal. Together they fought bulls from Don Antonio Silva's and Don David Telles's ranch.

Antoñete's alternativa was confirmed once again in Mexico on 22 November 1953. Standing as "godfather" then was Manuel Capetillo, while Juan Silveti bore witness. Bulls were supplied by the San Mateo ranch, and the one that Antoñete fought for the confirmation was named Cómico.

Antoñete's bullfighting career lasted over more than forty years, with several retirements and comebacks. He is considered one of bullfighting history's greatest. His faena (series of passes before the bullfighter slays the bull) with Cantinero from the Garzón ranch in 1985 is highly remembered by bullfighting fans.

== First period (1953–1975) ==
Antoñete's first period, which was full of ups and downs owing to his bone injuries, lasted from 1959 (Note: The source gives 1959 as the beginning of Antoñete's first period, but it seems likely that this is a typographical error; he had already been a fully-fledged matador for six years by then.) until his first retirement in 1975.

Antoñete saw 36 corridas in the 1953 bullfighting season, but at one such engagement on 11 August in Málaga, he suffered a goring. In the 1954 season, he had 43 engagements, but likewise, one of them brought a goring along with it, this one serious. The 1956 bullfighting season took him to Latin America, where he appeared at bullfights in both Peru and Colombia. He had 26 bullfighting engagements in 1957, three of which were in Madrid, and another 18 the next year.

Antoñete also saw triumphs in neighbouring France, winning the Oreille d'or ("Golden Ear") at Bordeaux in 1953, 1955, and 1956. At Nîmes on 6 June 1954, he gave the fair one of its highlights with a memorable bullfight with a bull from the Juan Pedro Domecq ranch. On 8 August 1965, he was borne shoulder-high out through the Great Gate at Las Ventas after reaping both ears from the bull Florido, from the Don Félix Cameno ranch. He alternated that afternoon with Jesús Delgadillo "El Estudiante" and Pepe Osuna. The cusp of this earlier phase in his bullfighting career, however, came on 15 May 1966 with a faena that he performed with the white Osborne bull named Atrevido ("Bold") at Las Ventas during the Feria de San Isidro ("Saint Isidore's Fair" — a yearly event at Las Ventas). It involved sixty muletazos (moves with the muleta), and the encounter established him at Las Ventas. He reaped one ear from Atrevido, and the encounter was one for which Antoñete would always be remembered. Atrevido weighed 486 kg, and the fight was watched by Spain's dictator, General Francisco Franco, who had brought Nicaragua's then president, René Schick Gutiérrez (who would die in office less than three months later) along to the bullring. The corrida that day opened with a young bull from the Fermín Bohórquez ranch (fought by the rejoneador Fermín Bohórquez himself), and appearing as the day's other bullfighters were Antoñete, Fermín Murillo, and Victoriano Valencia. The bullring's seats were sold out; so there was an enormous crowd. Only nine days later, at the same bullring, Antoñete was once again borne shoulder-high out through the Great Gate after cutting one ear from each of two bulls furnished by the Brothers of Felipe Bartolomé ranch. He managed the same feat again at Las Ventas on 7 July that same year at the Press Association bullfight, after leaving two bulls from the Carlos Núñez ranch earless. He was alternating that afternoon with Antonio Bienvenida and Curro Romero.

Antoñete's retirement bullfight in 1975, on the other hand, with bulls supplied by the Sánchez Fabrés ranch, was, by many accounts in the news, sad and lacking in triumph.

Indeed, Antoñete's "first period" was not altogether unbroken: he did no bullfighting at all in the 1959 and 1962 seasons.

== Comeback: the triumphal quinquennium (1981–1985) ==
Antoñete came back to the bullrings on 18 December 1977 in Venezuela, where he put on a presentation, with bulls from the Tarapío ranch, on Margarita Island. At this time, he was hoping to once again become a bullfighting star, after having believed that his days as a matador were over. There followed later engagements in that country in various places, including one in Guanare, alternating with Curro Girón and Juan Diego, with some impressive bulls from the Rocha ranch, and in Caracas, together with José Mari Manzanares and Pepe Cámara. It was in Caracas on 15 October 1978 that he reaped an ear from a bull from the Manuel Haro ranch.

Antoñete made his comeback in Spain on 12 April 1981 in Marbella, alternating with Rafael de Paula and Francisco Núñez Currillo, and with bulls supplied by the José Luis Osborne ranch (from one of which he cut an ear), and later on 22 May in Madrid, wearing a burgundy and gold suit of lights, and with Madrid bullfight-goers barely remembering who he was after his years away from the Spanish bullrings. That year, he appeared at 32 bullfighting events. When Spain's bullfighting season ended, he went to Mexico. Now aged 49, a new epoch in his career began, which went on for five years, and definitively made him into a bullfighting star.

In the 1983 bullfighting season, Antoñete had 25 corridas, and afterwards went to Colombia and Venezuela; the following year, he appeared at 23 engagements.

Although Antoñete earned a trip out through the Great Gate at Las Ventas on 3 June 1982 after cutting both ears from the bull Danzarín from the Don Juan Andrés Garzón ranch (alternating that afternoon with José Antonio Campuzano and Jairo Antonio Castro), this triumphal period's (1981–1985) highlight was nonetheless the faena that he performed with the bull named Cantinero ("Bartender") from the Garzón ranch on 7 June 1985 at Las Ventas. Some bullfighting historians even consider it superior, in terms of perfection and purity, to the one that he had performed with the Osborne bull nineteen years earlier. This performance with Cantinero earned Antoñete another ride on shoulders out through the Great Gate.

Other corridas for Antoñete that year included one on 22 April at the Maestranza in Seville, alternating with Curro Romero and Rafael de Paula as they fought bulls from the Carlos Núñez ranch, and another at Las Ventas in Madrid, alternating once again with Curro Romero, and also Durán, this time fighting bulls from the Santiago Martín ranch. He won Córdoba's Gran Capitán trophy. Less happily, he was also on hand at the Colmenar Viejo bullring on 30 August 1985 when one of his fellow bullfighters, José Cubero Sánchez, known as "El Yiyo", was killed by a bull.

These years were ones that brought Antoñete to the fore as one of bullfighting's stars, an achievement in which he overcame poor health, being overweight, and his advanced age for a bullfighter (he was by now over 50), due to a refined technique, and to a deep understanding of bulls:

Antoñete, as well as a high-class bullfighter, has been an extraordinary technician. I would say, a virtuoso of bullfighting technique. Only thus, with a most flawless knowledge of technique and bulls, has he been capable of triumphing at an unlikely age, before the very well-built bull that is fought in Madrid. And courage, because it takes a lot of courage to, at that age, let a Madrid bull come at one from twenty metres away. Antoñete has handled with special lucidity all that has to do with the grounds where the faena is executed. With the slightest possible effort he has known how to draw the longest charges from the bulls.

— Domingo Delgado de la Cámara, Revisión del toreo, Madrid, Alianza Editorial, 2002 (Note: The original Spanish text reads: Antoñete, además de torero de gran clase, ha sido un extraordinario técnico. Diría más, un virtuoso de la técnica torera. Sólo así, con un perfectísimo conocimiento de la técnica y de los toros, ha sido capaz de triunfar a una edad inverosímil, delante del cuajadísimo toro que se lidia en Madrid. Y valor, porque hace falta mucho valor para, a esa edad, dejarse venir desde veinte metros un toro de Madrid. Antoñete ha manejado con especial lucidez todo lo que se refiere a los terrenos donde ejecutar la faena. Con el mínimo esfuerzo posible ha sabido sacar las más largas embestidas de los toros..)

On 21 September 1985, Antoñete did exceptionally well at a corrida held at the bullring in Consuegra, appearing after a month's absence due to a goring that he had sustained in late August. He cut one ear from the first bull, and got the full set of appendages – both ears and the tail – from the fourth.

== Decline (1987–2000) ==
In 1985, only nine days after his feats at Consuegra, Antoñete once again announced his retirement, although he donned the suit of lights again in 1987 and kept active until 1997, when, at a corrida dedicated to Vicente Ruiz "El Soro", he yet again announced his retirement at Las Ventas on 2 March that year, this time for good, with his various comings and goings, which only prolonged his decline, setting him far from his five-year-long heyday in the early 1980s.

From 1998 onwards, Antoñete participated sporadically at bullfighting events at bullrings in both Spain and Latin America, at which he received recognition and awards despite his poor health, which was due to his tobacco addiction.

On 24 June 1998 – Antoñete's sixty-sixth birthday – he had his last trip out through the Great Gate at Las Ventas after a performance as lone bullfighter with bulls from the Las Ramblas ranch. He left one earless, and reaped a further ear from another. This was followed on 20 August with a harvest of three ears at Antequera.

In 2000, Antoñete participated in a corrida at Valencia's Monumental bullring in Venezuela for the benefit of those affected by the 1999 tragedy in the state of Vargas (now known as La Guaira).

On 16 February 2001, Antoñete was awarded the Gold Medal of Merit in the Fine Arts.

== Later years and death (2001–2011) ==
On 1 July 2001, after suffering a cardiorespiratory event during a bullfight that had been organized in Burgos, Antoñete saw fit to put an end to his career as a bullfighter (and at the same time, to his smoking), although he would still remain linked to tauromachy in other ways, such as working as a bullfighting commentator, especially on Cadena SER and Canal+, until his death in 2011 at the Hospital Puerta de Hierro ("Iron Gate Hospital") in Majadahonda due to bronchopneumonia, which complicated the emphysema which had been bedevilling his health for years. Many fellow bullfighters publicly lamented the loss. He was 79 years old.

The chapel of rest was installed on 24 October at 9 o'clock in the morning in the Alcalá Room at the Las Ventas bullring in Madrid, so that aficionados could pay their last respects. There, at what had once literally been his house – the bullring – he lay in repose until four o'clock that afternoon, after a seemingly endless stream of celebrities and members of the public had filed through: politicians, members of the arts community, members of the business world, bullfighters and society in general. Antoñete's coffin was then borne out shoulder-high through the Great Gate by a group of both active and retired bullfighters who took him into the bullring, and to shouts of "¡Torero, torero!", "¡Viva Antoñete!" and "¡Vivan los toreros!", he was then borne across the Great Gate's threshold one last time. He was buried in a tomb at the nearby Our Lady of Almudena Cemetery.

Shortly before the burial, Esperanza Aguirre, the then president of the Community of Madrid, placed upon the cape that covered Antoñete's coffin the Great Cross of the Order of the Second of May, which had been granted Antoñete posthumously. Madrid city council, for its part, announced that a street would soon be dedicated to the late bullfighter in the city of his birth. The street turned out to be a roundabout in the city's Barajas neighbourhood (at 40°28′56″N 3°36′30″W) called the Glorieta de Antonio Chenel "Antoñete".

== Style ==
Antoñete's style was regarded as classic, indebted to Juan Belmonte's aesthetics (his execution of the half verónica was a tribute to the Pasmo de Triana, whose admirer Antoñete declared himself to be) and Manolete's technique (which he had witnessed as an adolescent, and for whom he had begun smoking once he saw the maestro do it at the puerta de cuadrillas — the bullfighting team gate). The bullfighting historian Delgado de la Cámara offered a one-sentence synthesis of Antoñete's unmistakable style: "Crossed, chest out, leg forward, but bullfighting bound to Manolete's place." Antoñete also declared himself an admirer of his old alternativa godfather: "The bullfighter who most impressed me has been Manolete, and the one I most liked, Rafael Ortega, whom I furthermore considered the most complete bullfighter and the one who did bullfighting with the greatest purity."

== Private life ==
Born of Antoñete's first marriage, to Pilar López Quesada, were six children, and he had one more, born in 1999, with his second wife, the young Frenchwoman Karina Bocos, who was one of his great admirers. He also had an affair with actress Charo López. He lived with his second wife and their son on a farm called Las Laderas ("The Slopes") in Navalagamella, Madrid until he was hospitalized three days before his death.
