= Rafi Camino =

Spanish torero (born 1969)

- Born: Rafael Camino Sanz; 13 April 1969 (age 57); Madrid, Spain
- Occupation: Bullfighter
- Spouse: Natalia Álvarez (2003-2009)
- Children: Rafael Camino Álvarez
- Parent(s): Paco Camino and Mari Ángeles Sanz

Rafael Camino Sanz (born 13 April 1969), better known as Rafi Camino, is a Spanish former bullfighter, son of bullfighter Paco Camino.

== Career ==
He took the alternativa with El Litri II, in 1987, in the French bullring of Nîmes. On 23 August 1988 he was gored in the neck, which kept him away from bullrings. He eventually returned to the ring . On many occasions, he was accompanied on the poster by his friend El Litri.

He appeared on television, always as a guest. In 2015, Rafi was confirmed as one of the contestants of Supervivientes: Perdidos en Honduras where he took fourth place.

== Personal life ==
He was romantically involved in 1990 with glamour model and singer Samantha Fox.

On 25 November 2001 he married model and presenter Natalia Álvarez. They divorced in 2009.
