= Camas, Seville =

Camas
- Municipality
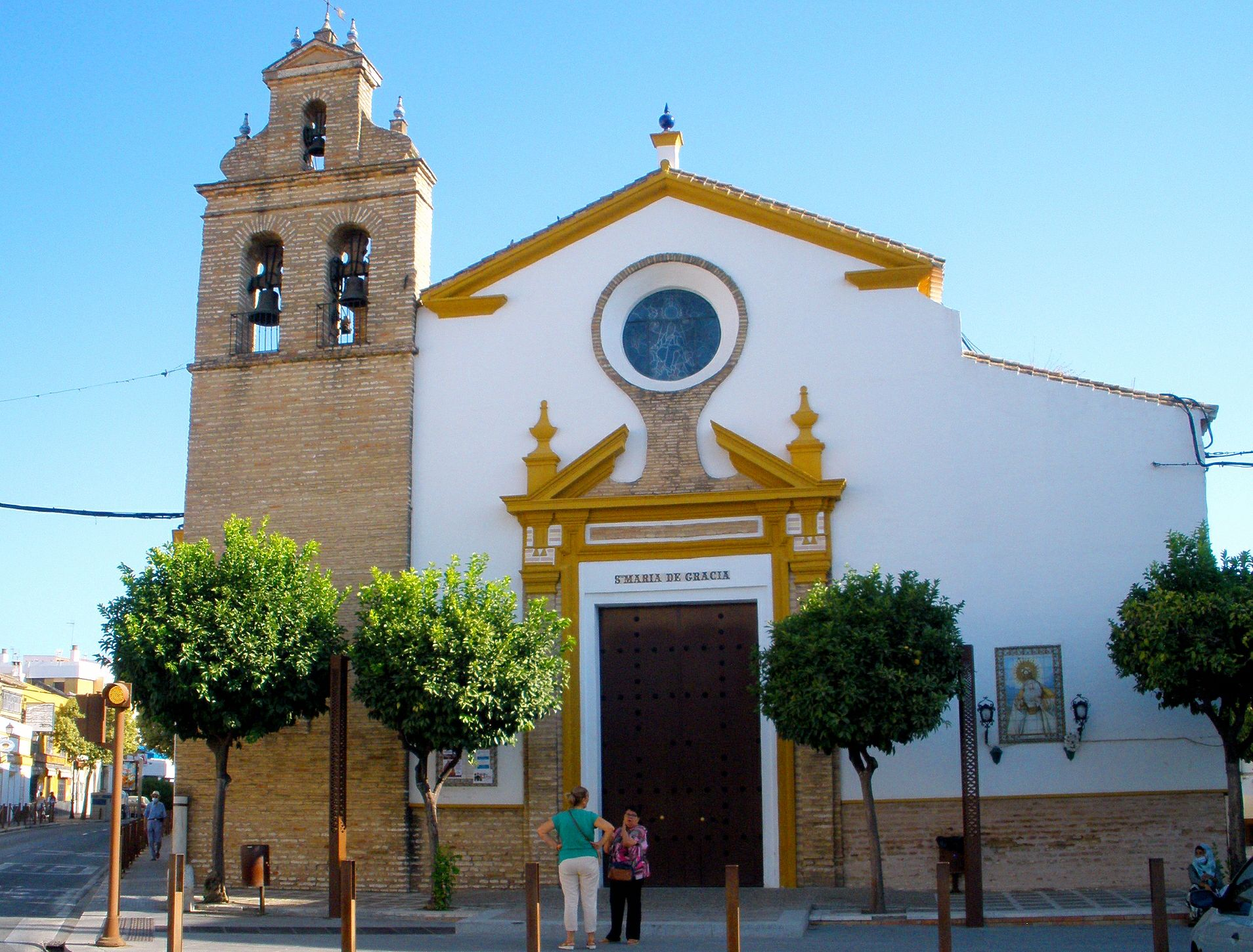
- Church of Santa María de Gracia

- Flag Coat of arms

- Location within Andalusia Location within Spain
- Coordinates: 37°24′N 6°02′W
- Country: Spain
- Province: Seville
- Municipality: Camas

Area
  - Total: 12 km^{2} (4.6 sq mi)
- Elevation: 13 m (43 ft)

Population (2025-01-01)
  - Total: 29,089
  - Density: 2,400/km^{2} (6,300/sq mi)
- Demonym: Camero(a) (in Spanish)
- Time zone: UTC+1 (CET)
  - Summer (DST): UTC+2 (CEST)

Camas is a municipality located in the province of Seville, Andalusia, Spain. According to the 2025 census (INE), the town has a population of 29,089.

== Notable people ==
- Paco Camino, bullfighter
- Rafael Núñez Florencio, historian, philosopher, and critic
- Sergio Ramos, professional footballer
- Curro Romero, bullfighter

== See also ==
- List of municipalities in Seville
