= Mondeño =

Spanish torero (1934–2023)

- Born: Juan García Jiménez; 7 January 1934; Puerto Real, Spain
- Died: 5 January 2023 (aged 88); Sanlúcar la Mayor, Spain
- Occupation: Torero

Juan García Jiménez (7 January 1934 – 5 January 2023), better known as Mondeño, was a Spanish bullfighter.

== Biography ==
Coming from a low-income family, García entered bullfighting to earn a living and get his family out of poverty. The only other occupations open to him in the beginning of the 1950s were the priesthood or Civil Guard. He made his debut as "sobresaliente" for a "rejoneador" (bullfighter on a horse) who was unable to kill his bull, in 1956. Mondeño killed the bull in his place and celebrated a great success. He was elevated from a young bullfighter (novillero) to professional (Matador de Toros) through the Alternativa (bullfighting) with Antonio Ordóñez as godfather and Manolo Vázquez as witness on 29 March 1959 in Sevilla and was confirmed on 17 May 1960 in Madrid by the same Antonio Ordóñez and Manolo Vázquez. In 1962, he participated in the film La becerrada with Antonio Ordóñez and Antonio Bienvenida.

Since he entered school with the La Salle brothers in Puerto Real at age 13, he developed a strong religious conviction. When he was at the Zenit of his bullfighting career, he decided to abandon, at the surprise of everybody, and entered the Monastery of Santo Domingo in Caleruega as a monk on 30 August 1964 looking for becoming a missionary. But he became more famous inside the monastery than outside, and decided to leave, reappearing in bullfighting in March 1966 in Lisbon and in Marbella on 3 April of that year with Paco Camino and El Cordobés. In 1966 he got to know his German partner. They lived together, married, and remained married until his death. He finished his bullfighting career at the end of 1969. Together they lived in Spain, Mexico and Paris for thirty years.

Mondeño died in Sanlúcar la Mayor on 5 January 2023, two days before his 89th birthday.

Recently a Documentary Film was shot by Varsau Broadcasting, Sevilla, with the cooperation of Canal Sur Televisión. The film can be accessed through Canal Sur Mas.
