= Traje de luces =

Traditional costume of bullfighters

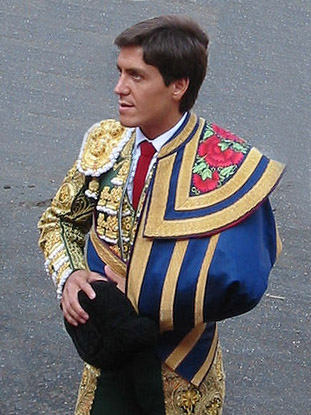
- Torero Antonio Barrera in a traje de luces with the ceremonial capote de paseo over his left arm and holding the montera
- Type: Bullfighter suit
- Material: Silk with gold, silver or jet thread embroidery
- Place of origin: Spain
- Introduced: 18th century

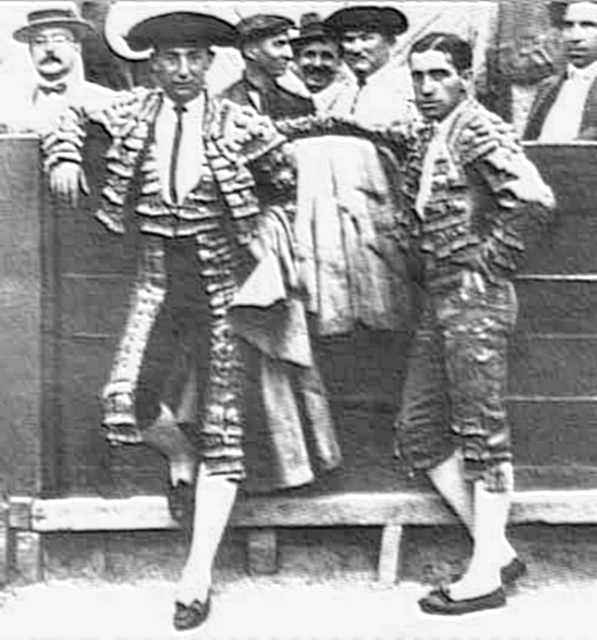
Two famous toreros: Joselito el Gallo and Juan Belmonte wearing the traje de luces.

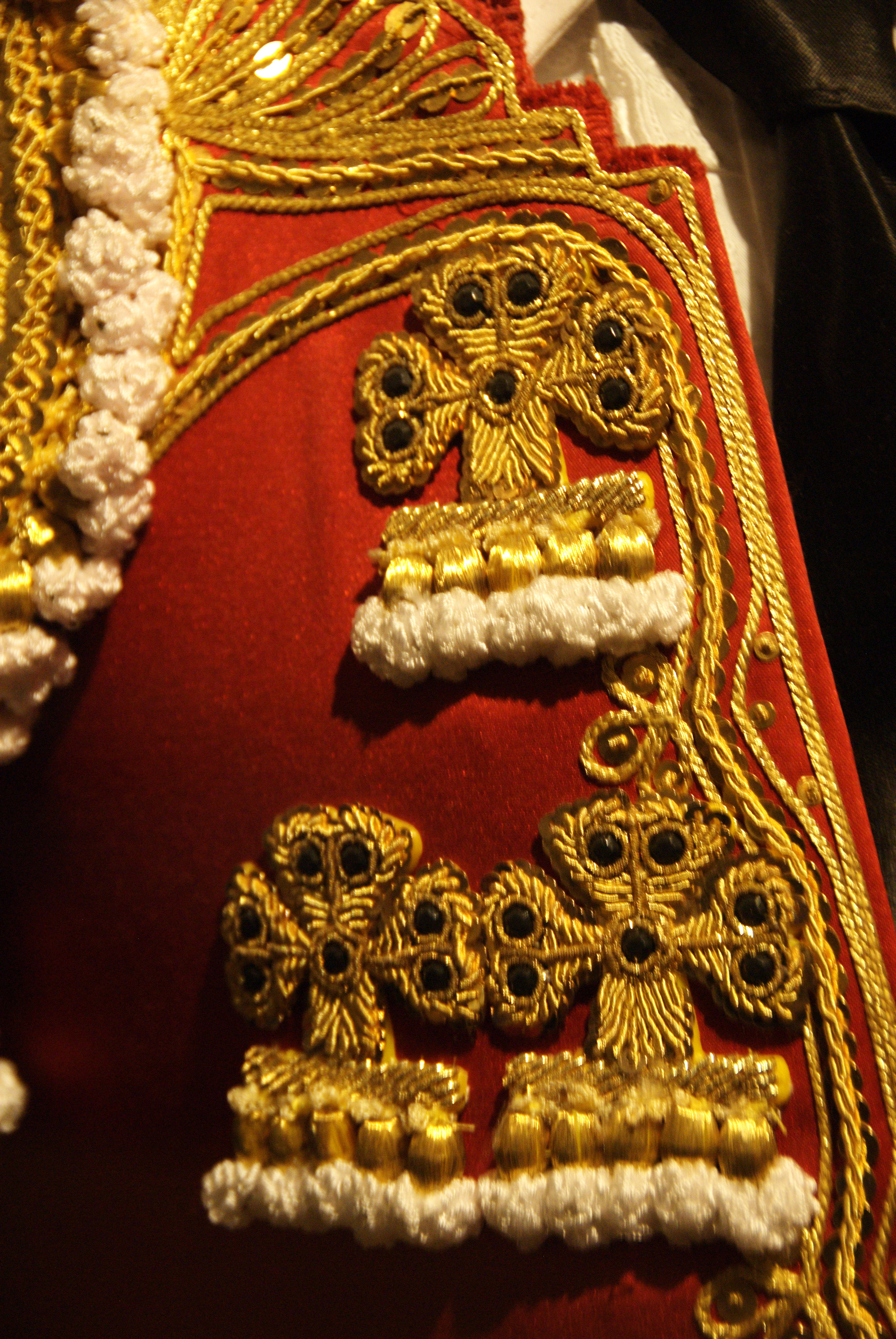
Detail of la chaquetilla.

The traje de luces ('suit of lights') is the traditional clothing that Spanish bullfighters (toreros, picadores, and rejoneadores) wear in the bullring. The term originates from the sequins and reflective threads of gold or silver. These trajes are based on the flamboyant costumes of the 18th-century dandies and showmen involved in bullfighting, which later became exclusive to the bullfighting ritual. Later adornments include the montera cap, more elaborate embroidery, and decorative accessories.

== Toreros ==
Getting "dressed to kill" constitutes a ceremonious ritual by itself: the matador is attended by a squire (mozo de espadas) who helps him to get dressed, often according to a "lucky" ritual in the privacy of a hotel room.

Components of the traje de luces for a torero may include:

- Montera: the hat that the bullfighter and his assistants (subalterns) wear. The bullfighter dresses during paseíllo (presentation) and in first two-thirds of the ritual called suerte de varas (goading phase) and banderillas (lances phase). It may be offered to a spectator as a mark of honour following a tradition set by Paquiro (Francisco Montes Reina, a famous 19th-century torero).
- Castoreño: a wide-brimmed round hat made of white or beige beaver skin that is worn by picadores (lancers on horseback).
- Corbatín: a narrow black necktie.
- Chaquetilla: a short and rigid jacket, with shoulder reinforcements, attached only at the upper shoulder to allow the free and unimpeded movement of the arms.
- Taleguilla: close-fitting tights which extend from the waist to underneath the knee, secured with tasseled cords or decorated gaiters. Taleguillas are supported by means of tirantes (braces or suspenders) concealed by decorative and protective clothing.
- Medias: two pairs of socks or stockings are used. The first pair are white cotton, and the external pair are silk. They are usually pink, but can also be white, red, or black.
- Camisa: a white shirt, sometimes embroidered, worn beneath the chaquetilla.
- Zapatillas: flat slippers similar in general appearance to ballet flats, and decorated with a bow.
- Capote de paseo: a vestige of the 19th-century promenade cape, this is a short silk mantle with rich and luxurious embroidery which is used during the paseíllo. Before the main performance starts, this ornate cape is exchanged for a more utilitarian red or purple muleta, a long cape used to entice the bull to charge. This has stiff reinforcing rods at the sides (muleta also means 'crutch' or 'cane' in Spanish).
- Coleta: A hair tie. In the 19th century, bullfighters wore long hair often secured in a bun (called a moña) reminiscent of 18th-century wigs. This was secured by the coleta. Traditionally, this bun was worn by a torero to indicate impending retirement. Modern bullfighters have instead tended to use a detachable hair adornment called a castañeta.

=== Colors ===
The main elements of the traje de luces, the pants and jacket, are usually of the same color and embellished with gold, sometimes silver or black, embroidery, sequins, and Austrian knots. The choice of colors are at the discretion of the bullfighter, with the most common colors being red, blue, white, pink, and brown. A bullfighter may pick a color for aesthetic reasons or based on superstitions, e.g. wearing a color worn previously that led to success in a bullfight or avoiding a color completely due to serious injuries while wearing that certain color. Selecting certain colors can also be for practical reasons, like picking lighter colors to call less attention from the bull.

== Picadores ==
Components of the traje de luces for a picador (the mounted goader).

- calzona de gamuza: boots made of chamois, instead of the zapatilla slippers. Steel armour is worn on the right leg to avoid being gored (cornada) by the bull's horns.
- castoreño: a traditional beaver-fur hat.
- chaquetilla: the picador's jacket, adorned with gold, a privilege reminiscent of times when the picador was equal to or more important than the matador.

== Rejoneadores ==
Rejoneadores are mounted lancers who slaughter the bull while riding on horseback. The Spanish rejoneadores use the traditional suit of Andalusian cattlemen, while their Portuguese counterparts dress in the style of Frederick II of Prussia, a fashion similar to the uniforms of upper-class cavalry in the 18th century.

== Goyaesque corridas ==
These bullfights celebrate the earliest versions of the modern ceremony, which evolved in the 18th century, and which were recorded by the painter Goya. The suit is similar to the conventional traje de luces, but with less adornment. The Taleguilla tights are more comfortable, being of silk with gold thread. Goyaesque toreros perform the paseíllo with a bicorne hat, and a capote de brega ('struggle cape') that is similar to the muleta, but in stiffer material and without the stiffening rods. It measures between 113 and 123 cm and weighs some 4 to 6 kg. Bullfights in the style of Goya are known as ronda, and are celebrated in Spain at the end of September, and also at Arles in France.
