= Alternativa (bullfighting) =

The alternativa ("alternative"), in Spanish-style bullfighting, is the act by which a novillero is authorized to be considered a torero, so that he can alternate in bullfighting with other bullfighters of the same category, both in bullfighting on foot and on horseback.

From the point of view of anthropology, it can be considered that taking the alternativa is a rite of passage or transition in which the bullfighter completes one stage of his formation to start another in which he becomes a professional matador of bulls. This change becomes effective with the ritual or ceremony of the alternativa and in the symbolism of the presentation of the bullfighter in society, in which he dons the traje de luces ("suit of lights") embroidered in gold or silver, which only bullfighters wear. The rite is again verified when the bullfighter puts an end to the professional stage of his life and retires as a matador of bulls with the act or ritual of passage of cutting the ponytail.

== History ==
There is no known written record that settles the question of when exactly the alternativa became a prerequisite for becoming a torero. The earliest surviving written record of the alternativa comes from José Sánchez de Neira in his 1879 work El toreo: gran diccionario tauromáquico (Bullfighting: the great dictionary of tauromachy), in which he states that bullfighters began engaging in the ceremony of the alternativa in the 19th century. The first name Neira mentions in a chronological list of bullfighters who underwent the alternativa is that of bullfighter Antonio de los Santos, who underwent the ceremony in 1801.
