= Maestranza (Seville) =

Bullring in Seville, Spain

Coordinates: 37.3860°N 5.9983°W

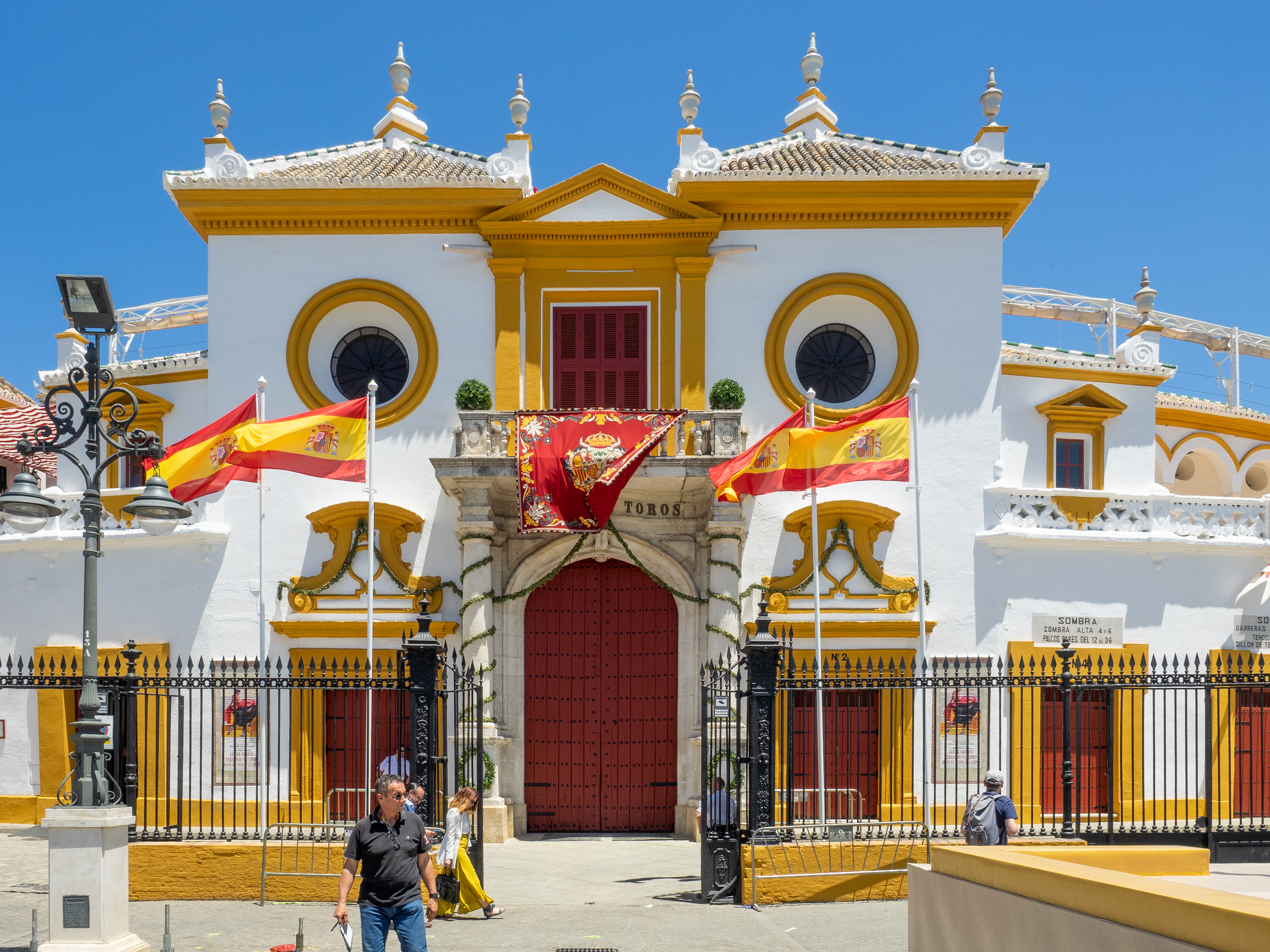
Principal façade, in Baroque style

The Plaza de Toros de la Real Maestranza de Caballería de Sevilla is a 12,000-capacity bullring in Seville, Spain. During the annual Seville Fair in Seville, it is the site of one of the most well-known bullfighting festivals in the world. It is a part of the Real Maestranza de Caballería de Sevilla, a noble guild established for traditional cavalry training.

The ring itself is considered one of the city's most enjoyable tourist attractions and is certainly one of the most visited. As a stage for bullfighting, it is considered one of the world's most challenging environments because of its history, characteristics, and viewing public, which is considered one of the most unforgiving in all of bullfighting fandom.

== History ==
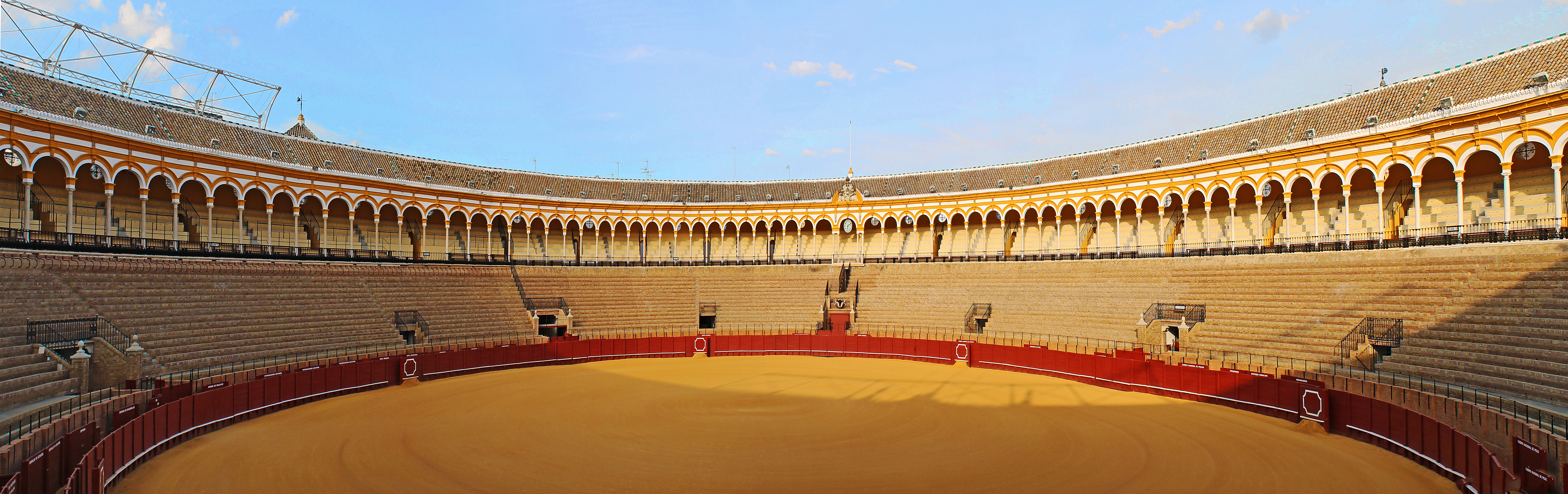
The bullring

Construction began in 1749 of a circular ring on Baratillo Hill to replace the rectangular bullring that was previously located there. In 1761, the construction began to incorporate ochavas (each ochava being equivalent to four arches). At this early stage, the construction supervisors were Francisco Sánchez de Aragón and Pedro y Vicente de San Martín. The inner facade of the plaza (called the Palco del Príncipe or Prince's Box) was completed in 1765. This 'box' consists of two parts: the access gate through which the successful bullfighters exit, and the theater box itself, which is reserved for the exclusive use of the Spanish royal family. The topmost part is composed of four arches over which is built a half-orange vault, whose topmost portion is covered by white and blue tiles. The sculptural group that concludes the composition is the work of the Portuguese sculptor Cayetano de Acosta. The Palco was built for the Infante de España, Felipe de Borbón, son of Felipe V and Isabel de Farnesio.

When Carlos III prohibited bullfighting celebrations in 1786, work on the sculptures was halted, even though only one-third of the plaza had been completed at the time. The old Palco de la Diputación (earlier called the Palco de Ganaderos or Herdsmen's Box) is also from this period and is situated over the toriles gate and in front of the Palco del Príncipe.

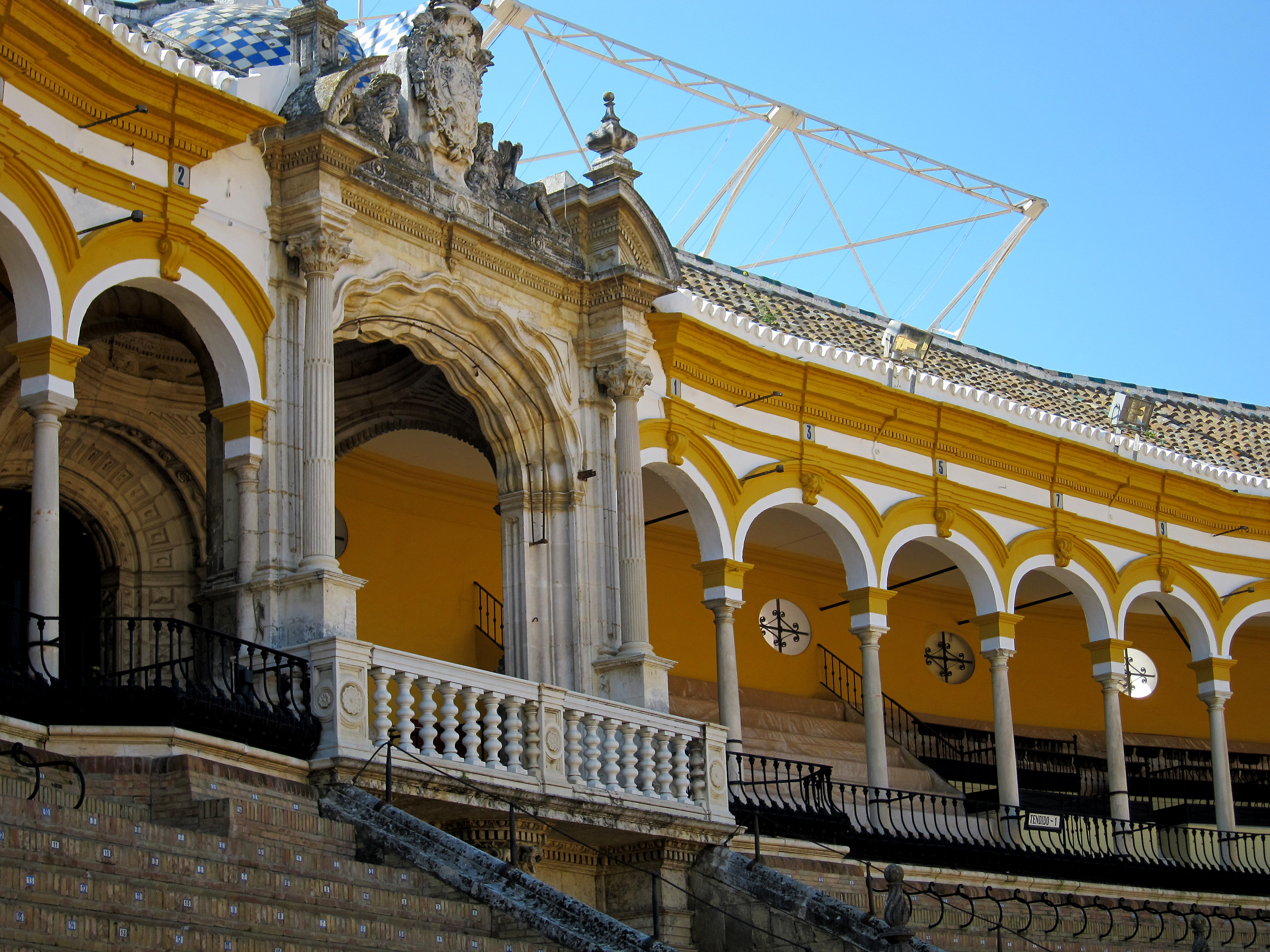
The Prince's (or Royal) Box at the bullring

After 34 years the cover of the launching slips of half of the ring was finished, to the left and right of the Palco del Príncipe; being easily viewed from the cathedral and the Giralda it was reflected in a great number of stamps of the time. By 1868 the Palco de la Diputación was in such a lamentable state that Italian sculptor Augusto Franchy undertook the improvement himself, building a new area with a marble balustrade and the crest of the Real Maestranza de Caballería. The construction of five balconies to each side of the Palco de la Diputación was also added where the ring's clock is currently situated. The construction of the ring was completed in 1881; two thirds was constructed in stone, with the remainder in wood.

Between 1914 and 1915 the stone grandstands were redone in brick under the direction of Sevillian architect Aníbal González. All the rows were reconstructed with a smoother slope. Ten to twelve rows of shaded seating were constructed as well as fourteen rows in the sun and three rows of barrier. A row of armchairs were built in the superior part of the shaded area, in front of the theater boxes.

== The Season ==
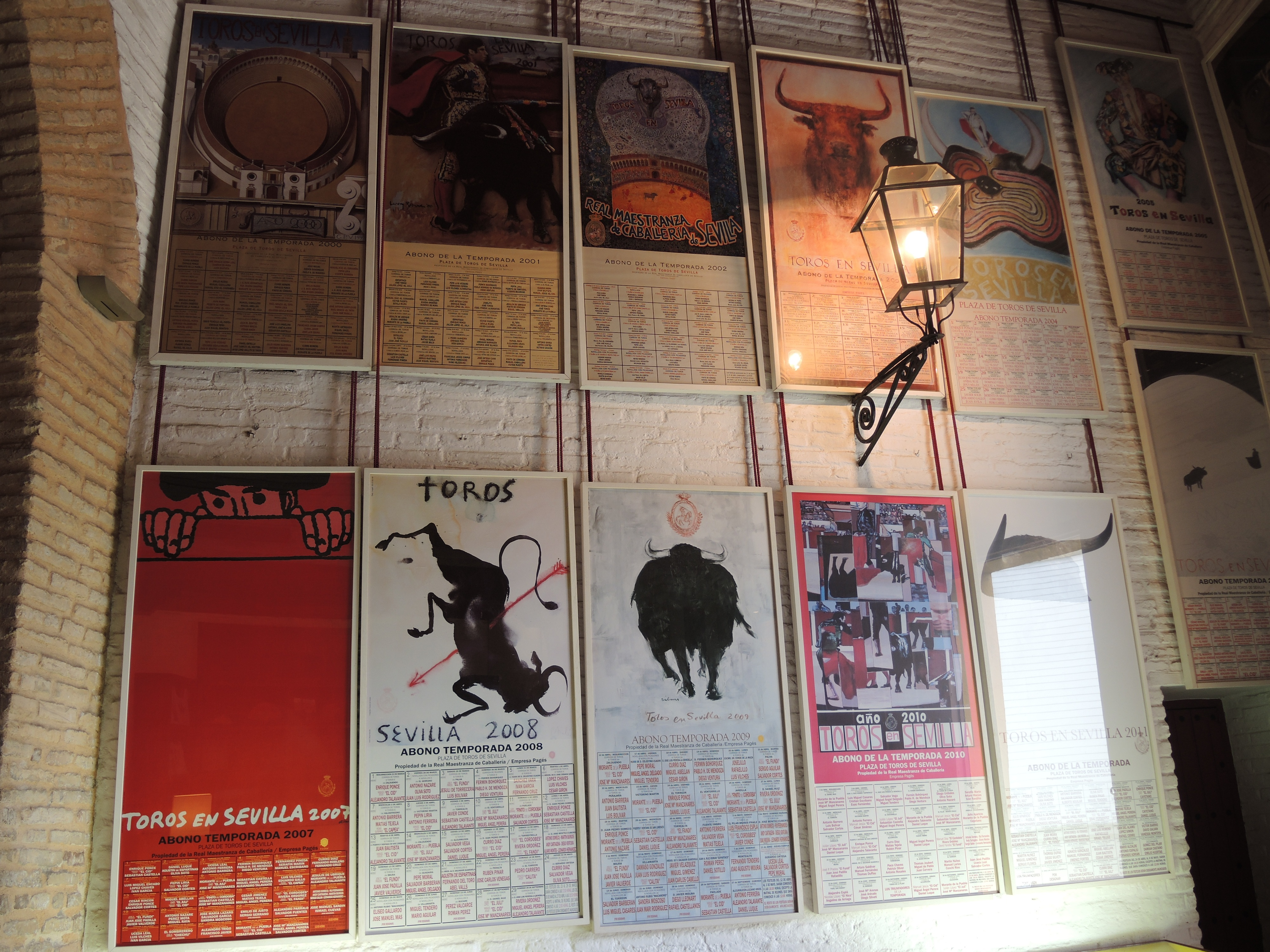
Seville season posters

Bullfights in Seville during the Feria de Abril are the most important event of the city's bullfighting calendar. The regular season goes from March or April (depending on the Semana Santa dates) until late September. Every year the Real Maestranza commissions a painter to produce a poster announcing the bullfighting season in its Royal Bullring.

== Tours ==
Regular tours are conducted of the Bullring and the Museum.
