= Julio Aparicio (disambiguation) =

Julio Aparicio (born 1955) is a Peruvian footballer.

Julio Aparicio may also refer to:

- Julio Aparicio Díaz (born 1969), Spanish bullfighter
- Julio Aparicio Martínez (born 1932), Spanish bullfighter and father of Julio Aparicio Díaz
- Julio Aparicio Nieto, Spanish bullfighter and grandfather of Julio Aparicio Díaz
