= Aparicio =

Aparicio is both a surname and a given name. Notable people with the name include:

Surname

- António Aparício (footballer, born 1958) (born 1958), Portuguese footballer
- Carlos Aparicio (born 1982), Bolivian politician
- Ernesto Aparicio (1910-2006), Venezuelan professional baseball
- Huáscar Aparicio (1972–2013), Bolivian singer
- Isabel Aparicio (born 1935), Venezuelan singer
- Jaime Aparicio (1929–2026), Colombian Olympic hurdler
- Jaime Aparicio Otero (born 1955), Bolivian lawyer, diplomat and political consultant
- José Aparicio (1773–1838), Spanish painter of the Neoclassic period
- Julio Aparicio Díaz (born 1969), Spanish bullfighter, known for getting gored through his mouth by a bull
- Julio Aparicio Martínez (born 1932), Spanish bullfighter, Aparicio Díaz's father
- Luis Aparicio (born 1934), Venezuelan baseball player
- Luis Aparicio Ortega (1912–1971), Venezuelan professional baseball
- Manny Aparicio (born 1995), Canadian soccer player
- Nestor Aparicio (born 1968), American radio personality
- Rafael Angel Aparicio (born 1935), Venezuelan composer
- Rafaela Aparicio (1906–1996), Spanish film and theatre actress
- Salvi Aparicio (1949–2026), Spanish footballer
- Severo Aparicio Quispe (1923–2013), Peruvian Roman Catholic bishop
- Sofia Aparício (born 1970), Portuguese model and actress
- Yalitza Aparicio (born 1993), Mexican actress

Given name

- Aparicio Méndez (1904–1988), Uruguayan political leader
- Aparicio Saravia (1856–1904), Uruguayan political leader

== See also ==
- 4232 Aparicio, inner main-belt asteroid
- Estadio Luis Aparicio El Grande, stadium in Maracaibo, Venezuela
