= Study for a Bullfight, Number 2 =

1969 painting by Francis Bacon

- Artist: Francis Bacon
- Year: 1969
- Medium: oil on canvas
- Dimensions: 198,3 cm × 147,5 cm (781 in × 581 in)
- Location: Museum of Fine Arts of Lyon, Lyon

Study for a Bullfight, Number 2 is an oil-on-canvas painting by the British artist Francis Bacon, from 1969. The painting now belongs to the Museum of Fine Arts of Lyon, which acquired it in 1997. It is the second on a series of three paintings which also include Study for a Bullfight, Number 1 and Study for a Bullfight, Number 3, all executed in 1969.

== History and description ==
Bacon was influenced for this series of three paintings by his French friend Michel Leiris interest by bullfighting; he appreciated in it the emotion of the bloody images charged with eroticism, and its dramatic side. Leiris admired these paintings, with its distortions of the subject of bullfighting, not only for its violence, but also for its bloody aspect.

Bacon did his research for this painting series. On the back panel, we recognize the number 5, surrounded by a white circle, representing one of the panels suspended from the palisade of the tiered seating. The audience is concentrated in a gray cylinder against a yellow background. His inspiration comes from observing the bullring, the alleyway, and the barriers.

== Reception ==
According to Jean-Louis Prat, "the deadly ballet that unites the matador and the bull is not far removed from the work or life of Bacon", who liked to take risks in painting as he did in gambling, mainly at the roulette in Monte Carlo. He makes it a dizzying game of curves and counter-curves, man and beast intertwine, mingle, to translate the rhythm of the blows of the horns and the turns of the muleta.

== Popular culture ==
The current painting was the subject of the poster for the Feria de Nîmes in 1992.

== See also ==
- List of paintings by Francis Bacon
- 1969 in art
