= Julio Aparicio Díaz =

Spanish bullfighter

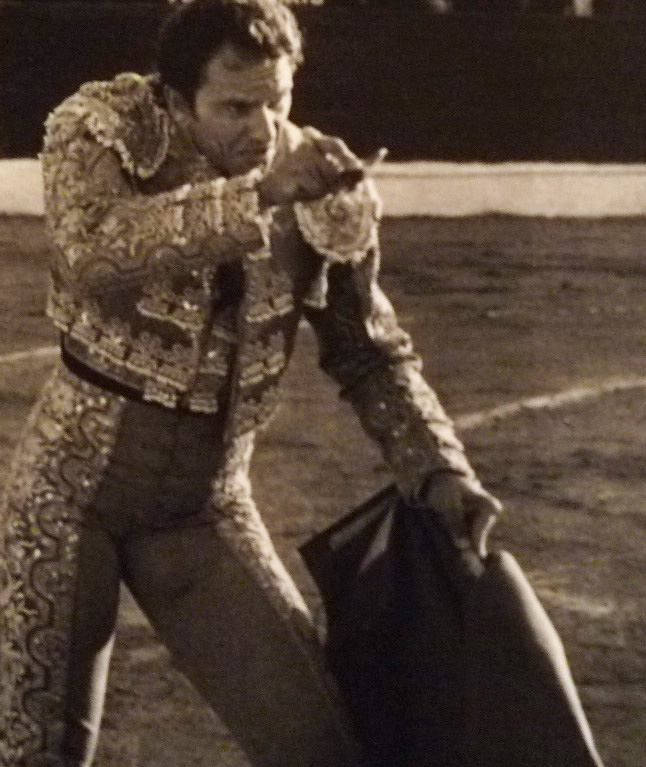
- Julio Aparicio Díaz in 1997.

Personal information
- Nickname: Julito
- Born: Julio Aparicio Díaz; 4 January 1969 (age 57) Seville, Spain

Sport
- Sport: Bullfighting
- Rank: Torero

Julio Aparicio Díaz (born 1969), also known as Julito Aparicio, is a Spanish bullfighter from Seville. Aparicio made his public début in bullfighting at the age of fourteen in 1984. He was confirmed as a torero, or matador, in 1994.

== Early life ==
Aparicio was born on 4 January 1969 in Seville, Spain, and is the son of Julio Aparicio Martínez, who was a famous torero in the 1950s and 1960s and the grandson of Julio Aparicio Nieto, who was also involved in bullfighting. Aparicio's mother was Malena Loreto, a famous flamenco dancer and his sister Kika Aparicio is an actress. Aparicio made his first public appearance in relation to bullfighting on 2 September 1984 at the Arenas de San Pedro. In 1986, Aparicio, while thinking about studying law, decided to leave everything for a career in bullfighting at the age of sixteen.

== Career ==
Aparicio débuted as a novillero, a fighter of young bulls, on 8 February 1987 in Gandia, Spain alongside Fernando Lozano and Gregorio de Jesús as a picador. Later that year, he went to the European Parliament in Strasbourg to defend the Spanish tradition of bullfighting. Aparicio received his alternativa (alternative), a ceremony which a novillero starts fighting mature bulls for the first time as a torero, on 15 April 1990 at the Royal Cavalry of Seville. After that, he made his French début in Nîmes on 16 May 1991 at the Arena of Nîmes.

Aparicio had his confirmación, a confirmation of his status as a torero, four years later on 18 May 1994 at Las Ventas in Madrid. He also received a confirmación in Mexico on 13 November 1994. Aparicio was greatly praised from fans for his performance at his confirmación in May. On the fifth bull of the afternoon, Aparicio fought a bull of the Alcurrucén breed named Cañego. This performance is regarded as his best, and the one that established him as a top bullfighter.

From 1994 to 1998 he was advertised to participate in a majority of the bullfighting festivals held in Spain and France. At the 1998 San Isidro Festival, he served as the Godfather to Morante de la Puebla for Puebla's confirmación ceremony. On 4 June 1998 he announced his withdrawal from events and was inactive until 2000. He had his reaparición, or comeback, on 15 March 2000 in an event with José Mari Manzanares and Juan Bautista in Fitero.

In the following years since his return to the major fairs where he gained his notability, he has had several mishaps which has resulted in not being reviewed as favorable compared to years past. On 23 March 2008, at Las Ventas, he was gored by a bull which caused a severe laceration in his left thigh. Also, prior to his accident on 21 May, he only had four performances for the 2010 season. He was considered favorable for two of the eight bulls he fought, and he was booed in his last performance at Nîmes, France before the accident. He has drawn criticism of not being "glamorous", not being close enough to the bulls to be considered dangerous, and not making the bull "dance" in his later years.

On 21 May 2010 Aparicio was severely injured during a performance when a bull gored him. The incident happened as Aparicio was attempting the faena, a series of passes in which a torero uses his cape and sword before delivering the estocada, or death blow. The bull immediately withdrew its horn from Aparicio's neck, and Aparicio attempted to leave the bullring, but lost consciousness and had to be carried out. Two other matadors stepped in and slew Opiparo. The result of the injury was a punctured tongue, a fractured hard palate, a fractured upper maxilla and several broken teeth. Doctors at Las Ventas operated on Aparicio for an hour and performed an emergency tracheotomy to stabilize him. He was transferred to the 12 October Hospital in Madrid where he underwent six hours of surgery to repair his fractured jaw. He left the intensive care unit on 24 May after recovering from surgery. He went back to the hospital in critical condition on 28 May due to acute respiratory failure that required ventilation through a breathing tube due to swelling from an infection. He left the hospital on 6 June after recovering once again.

After the accident, Aparicio fired his manager Simon Casas who had said in an interview that Aparicio would not be able to psychologically recover so quickly. Aparicio made a return to bullfighting in Pontevedra on 1 August, ten weeks after the accident. He later revealed that on the day of the accident, he had competed with a broken middle finger on his left hand.

== Career highlights ==
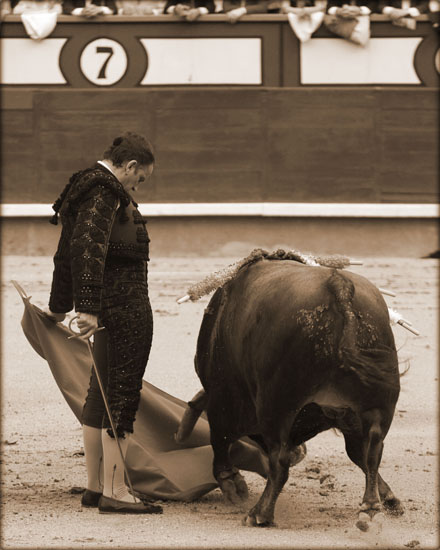
Julio Aparicio at a fair in 2008.

| Event: | Location: | Date: | Bulls or steers: | Notes: | Refs: |
|---|---|---|---|---|---|
| Début novillero | Gandia, Spain | 8 February 1987 | El Torreón | Cartel: Fernando Lozano; Cartel: Gregorio de Jesús | |
| Presentación | Seville, Spain | 16 July 1989 | Torrestrella (mixed with Curro) | Cartel: Curro Vásquez | |
| Alternativa | Seville, Spain | 15 April 1990 | Torrestrella | Godfather: Curro Romero; Witness: Juan Antonio Ruiz | |
| Début in France | Nîmes, France | 16 May 1991 | Sánchez Delp | Cartel: Curro Vásquez; Cartel: Emilio Muñoz | |
| Confirmación | Seville, Spain | 18 May 1994 | Manolo Gonzalez | Godfather: José Ortega Cano; Witness: Jesulín de Ubrique | |
| Confirmación | Mexico | 13 November 1994 | Xajay | Godfather: Juan Mora; Witness: Manolo Mejía | |
| Reaparición | Fitero, Spain | 15 March 2000 | Carmen Segovia | Cartel: José María Manzanares; Cartel: Juan Bautista | |

== See also ==
- Bullfighting
- List of bullfighters
- Torero
