= Maya ballgame =

Mesoamerican sport

Maya ballgame, which is a part of the Mesoamerican ballgame, is a sporting event that was played throughout the Mesoamerican era by the Maya civilization, which was distributed throughout much of Central America. One of the common links of the Mayan culture of Mexico, Guatemala, Honduras, and Belize is the game played with a rubber ball, known from several sources. The Maya ballgame was played on big stone courts. The ball court itself was a focal point of Maya cities and symbolized the city's wealth and power.

== History ==
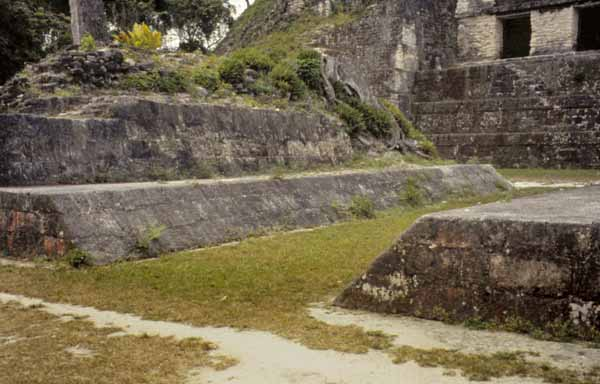
A ballcourt at Tikal, in the Petén Basin region of the Maya lowlands

Maya ballgame originated more than 3,500 years ago. The Popol Vuh describes the history of the Kʼicheʼ people and their rulers and mentions the important position of the Maya ballgame. Through this ball game, a conflict of the forces of darkness and light is described and enacted.

By tradition, the twin brothers Hun Hunaphu and Xbalanque used their time on earth to play ball.The noise of the game aroused the anger of Vucub Came, the master of the underworld. A fight ensued, which resulted in the formation of the game. After the game, one of the brothers was decapitated and his head was used as the game ball. From the decapitated trunk of the player, blood escaped in the form of snakes. This blood was taken as a symbol of fertility. This scene is depicted in reliefs on the walls of game courts, such as the most famous example in Chichen Itza in Mexico.

== Public structure ==
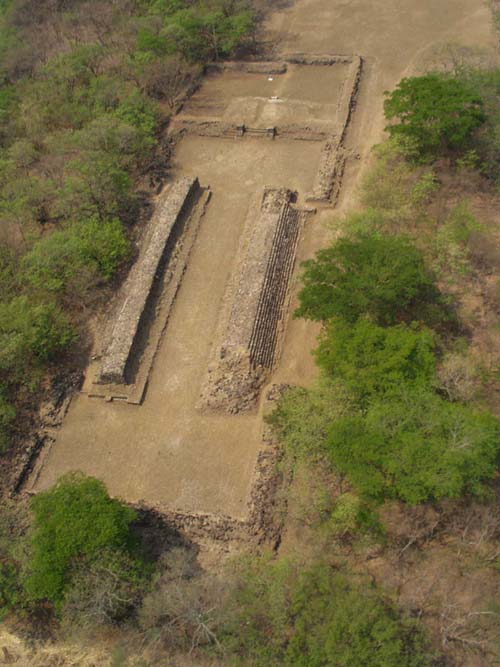
Classic -shaped ball court in Cihuatan site, El Salvador

In the highlands of Chiapas and of Guatemala alone, 300 courts have been found. Of these, 85% have been dated in the post-classic period. Only two early classic courts have been reported: Palenque and Copan.

The playing arena was in the shape of an uppercase "I" with a long middle section and parallel ends. High platforms on either side of the court allowed for large numbers of spectators. Arenas were decorated with portable stone court markers known as hacha, usually depicting animals or skulls. The ball court was surrounded by painted murals that depicted Mayan mythology, warriors, captives, rulers, and ceremonies.

The ballcourt in Cerros is contemporary and date to the Tulix ceramic phase (100BC-100AD). Both are similar in date to the other major public structures. Both courts at Cerros are oriented N-S and orient to the N-S medial axis of a pyramid. They are also oriented with the W axis of another pyramid, and its associated plaza, appears to intersect the medial axis of the site at a point approximately equidistant from either court.

== Religious aspects ==
The Maya ballgame was more than just an athletic event; it was also a religious event of regeneration that the Maya saw as integral to their continued existence. The Maya showed devotion to their gods by playing the game and by sacrifices. Scholars debate about who was subject to ritual killing at ball games and how frequently. Opinions range from "The ballgame provided an opportunity to show devoutness to the gods by sacrificing captured kings and high lords, or the losing opponents of the game" to "the players were most likely not sacrificed.... sometimes a captive might be executed at the game, but [these sacrifices] weren't an integral part of the game. That person would have been expedited [executed] anyway."

Uaxaclajuun Ubʼaah Kʼawiil's ritual sacrifice shows death by decapitation and disembowelment. As trophy heads were popular in Mayan Culture, it follows that they were important in ballgame. Some death heads occurred as figurines; so sacred were the small sculptures that they were preserved and appear as offerings at non-elite burials in Late Classic domestic interments. Judging from sculptural portrayals, decapitation was most likely the standard method of sacrifice used at the ballcourts of El Tajin, Aparicio, Veracruz, and Chichen Itza, Yucatan. Severing of the head is also seen in the Popol Vuh. Some sources say the winning team's captain was decapitated, and at Chichen ìtza you can barely see that a squash and a couple of snakes representing Kukulkan popped out of the sacrificed captain's head.

== Gameplay ==
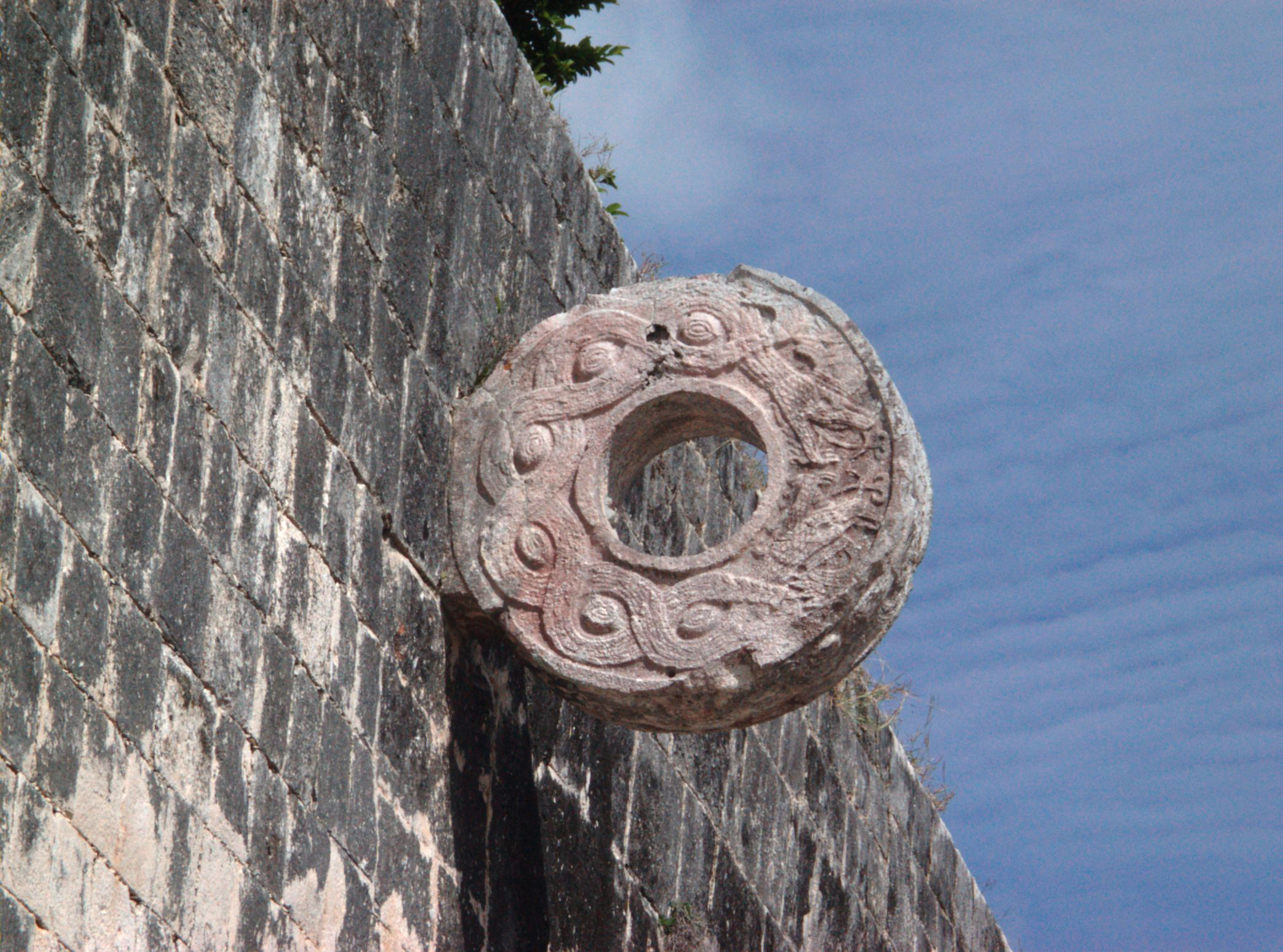
Ballcourt goal, Chichén Itzá

The rules seem to have changed over the centuries.

Certainly two teams played against each other. The number of players varied between 2 and 6 players per team. Sometimes, an additional person is seen in the illustrations, who is believed to be a referee. The game was played for 2 weeks.

A rubber ball was always used. Its size and weight varied over the centuries. Most historians assume a weight of 3–4 kg (7–9 lb) and a size of a skittle ball (110–130 mm). The existence of a caoutchouc tree was necessary to produce the ball. These trees were found in the tropical regions in the Maya territories.

The ball was put in motion by action of the right hip, the right elbow, and the right knee, and was not permitted to touch the ground. It could be passed between players in each team by propulsion by those body parts. The aim was to move the ball back to the opposite team, preferably through the ring. The goal of the opposition (what today might be termed ‘the defense’) was to force the offense to lose control and to allow the ball to touch the ground. The stone ring was an innovation of the late-classic and early post-classic periods, as seen in Chichén Itzá.

The usual dress for players is known from iconographic and figural findings. These show leather protection mainly at the hips and the chest, but sometimes also at the knees and the arms, though very seldom at the feet. The clothing was used to protect against the impact of the ball. The protected parts of the body were used to strike the ball. Some players would wear headdresses (like deer heads) for ritual reasons.

=== Physical aspects of the ballgame ===
Despite variations in game-play over the centuries, it would appear that the physical exertion required was most similar to those of soccer or tennis. Most likely, the players of the ballgame manifested heart rate and blood pressure responses consistent with physical loads of light/moderate intensity, in the range of 4.5–5.5 METs. This supports the theory that cardiovascular demands of popular sports have remained relatively similar through several millennia.

== See also ==
- Mesoamerican ballgame
