= Hôtel de Ville, Nîmes =

Town hall in Nîmes, France

Hôtel de Ville
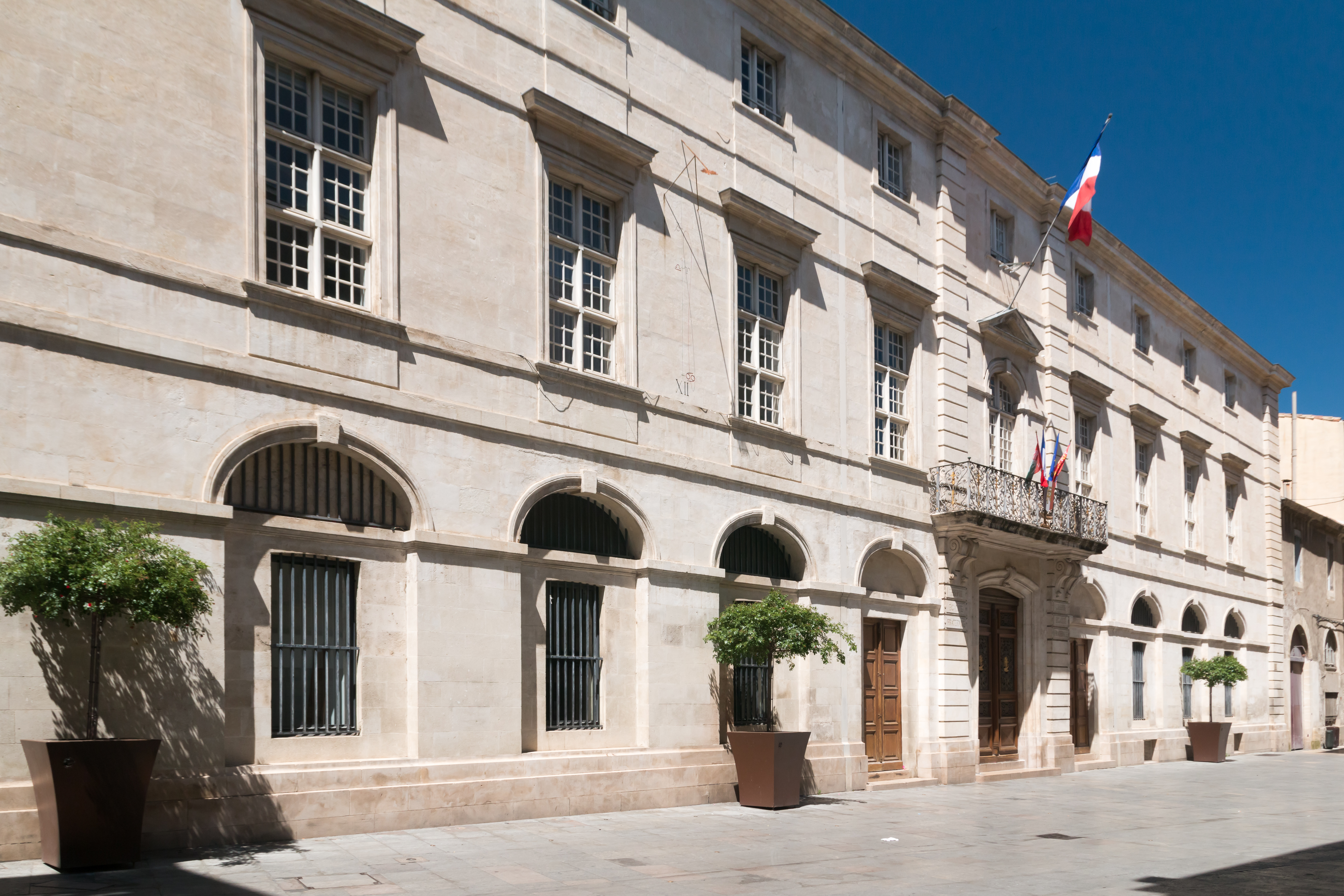
- The main frontage of the Hôtel de Ville in May 2015

General information
- Type: City hall
- Architectural style: Neoclassical style
- Location: Nîmes, France
- Coordinates: 43.8366°N 4.3603°E
- Completed: 1703

Design and construction
- Architect: Augustin-Charles d'Aviler

Monument historique
- Official name: Hôtel de ville
- Type: Inscrit
- Designated: 1959
- Reference no.: PA00103101

The Hôtel de Ville (French pronunciation: [otɛl də vil], City Hall) is a municipal building in Nîmes, Gard, southern France, standing on the Place de l'Hôtel de Ville. It was designated a monument historique by the French government in 1959.

== History ==
In medieval times, the city was managed by the consuls who were based in Maison carrée, which dated from the 1st century. By the early 14th century, the consuls had established a town hall in the Rue de L'Horloge. After the Bishop of Nîmes, Gaucelme de Deaux, died leaving a bell to the community in 1373, the canons of the cathedral gave the bell to the consuls, so that it could be installed in a purpose-built belfry alongside the town hall.

In the late 17th century, the council sought larger premises from which to administer the city. Louis XIV offered l'ancienne trésorerie (the old treasury building), which was the place where local people paid their taxes and which dated from the 14th century.

The consuls took ownership of the building in August 1700. Although remnants of the old treasury building on Rue de La Trésorerie survived, the main frontage was demolished. The new structure was designed by Augustin-Charles d'Aviler in the neoclassical style, built in ashlar stone and was officially opened on 30 August 1703. The design involved a symmetrical main frontage of nine bays facing onto the Rue de la Romaine (later renamed the Place de l'Hôtel de Ville). The central bay featured a segmental headed doorway with a moulded surround and a keystone on the ground floor, a French door with an archivolt, a keystone and a triangular pediment on the first floor, and a small square windows on the second floor. The wings of four bays each incorporated round headed openings with moulded surrounds and keystones on the ground floor: of these, the inner openings contained doors, while the outer ones contained windows. The wings were fenestrated with mullioned and transomed windows with prominent cornices on the first floor and by small square windows on the second floor. There were quoins on either side of the central bay and at the corners of the building. Internally, the ground floor was allocated for retail use, and a Salle du Conseil (council chamber) was established on the first floor.

Suspended above the grand staircase were four stuffed crocodiles, which had been brought back from Egypt and dated from the late 16th to the early 18th centuries. The crocodiles recalled the historic allegiance of Nîmes to the emperor Augustus who ensured Egypt became an imperial province of the newly established Roman Empire and who ruled Egypt as the Roman pharaoh. An extra wing was added at the rear of the building in 1837.

After the Second World War, a plaque was installed in the town hall to commemorate the lives of the 271 local people who died on 27 May 1944 during American aerial bombing of the area. An extensive programme of refurbishment works, was carried out between 1986 and 1988. The works included the restoration of the main façade to a design by Ariel Balmassière and the refurbishment of the main reception rooms to a design by Philippe Starck.
