= Jean-César Vincens-Plauchut =

French politician (1755–1801)

Member of the Legislative Assembly
- In office 7 September 1791 – 20 September 1792
- Constituency: Gard

Personal details
- Born: September 16, 1755 Nîmes, Languedoc, Kingdom of France
- Party: Independent
- Spouse: Louise Plauchut

Jean-César Vincens-Plauchut (September 16, 1755 – August 15, 1801) was a French politician. Vincens-Plauchut was an MP for Gard.
