= Fernando Lozano =

American labor economist

Fernando Lozano is an American labor economist. He is the Morris B. and Gladys S. Pendleton Professor of Economics at Pomona College in Claremont, California.

== Career ==
Lozano joined the Pomona College faculty in 2005. He is co-chair of the governor of California's Council of Economic Advisors and is a research fellow at the IZA Institute of Labor Economics in Bonn, Germany. In July 2022, he was appointed the Morris B. and Gladys S. Pendleton Professor of Economics, an endowed chair.
