= Arena of Nîmes =

Ancient Roman amphitheater in Nîmes, France

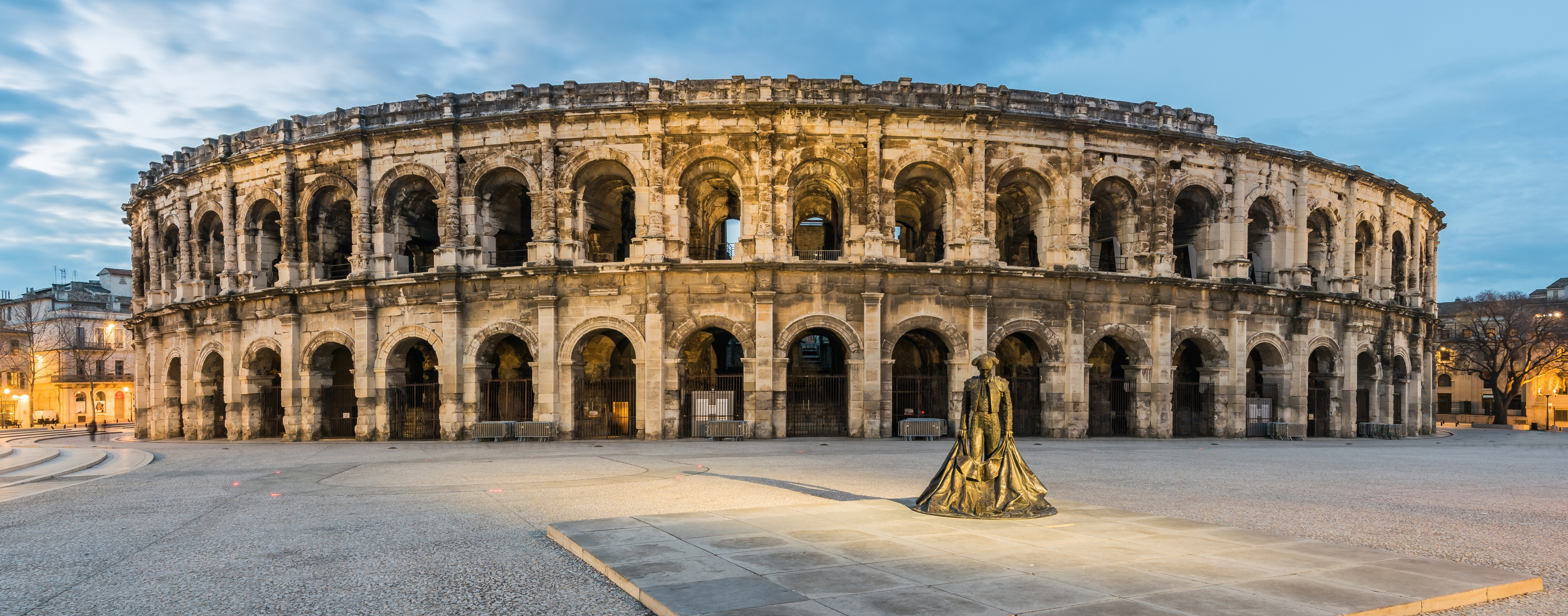
- Exterior of the Arena of Nîmes

- Location within France
- 43°50′06″N 4°21′36″E
- Type: Roman amphitheatre
- Periods: Roman Empire
- Location: Nîmes, France

History
- Built: c. 100 AD

Site notes
- Height: 21 m (69 ft)
- Length: 133 m (436 ft)
- Width: 101 m (331 ft)
- Original Capacity: ~20,000; Current: 13,800

The Arena of Nîmes (French: Arènes de Nîmes; Occitan: Arena de Nimes) is a Roman amphitheatre in Nîmes, Southern France. Built around 100 AD, only about twenty years after the Colosseum of Rome, it is one of the best-preserved Roman amphitheatres in the world. It is 133 metres (436 ft) long and 101 metres (331 ft) wide, with an arena measuring 68 by 38 metres (223 by 125 ft). The outer facade is 21 metres (69 ft) high with two storeys of 60 arcades. It is among the 20 largest Roman amphitheatres of the 400 in existence. In Roman times, the building could hold 24,000 spectators, who were spread over 34 tiers of terraces divided into four self-contained zones or maeniana.

During Roman times, the Arena of Nîmes functioned as an arena where gladiators battled each other and wild animals. The advent of early medieval Christianity marked the end of these events, prompting the transformation of the amphitheater into a fortress and subsequently a walled town. The 19th century saw the restoration of the arena, accompanied by the removal of houses that had been constructed inside it.

Today, the Arena of Nîmes is the site of two annual bullfights during the Feria de Nîmes, and it is also used for other public events like the reenactment of antiquity "The great Roman Games" and for concerts.

== History ==
Roman amphitheatres first appeared in Southern Italy in the second century BC and were specifically designed for putting on spectacular combats between gladiators or animal fights. This new type where of construction took the form of two theatres set face to face with an oval arena which allowed everyone, wherever they were sitting, to see the spectacles being acted out in the sand covering below, without danger of missing anything.

At its high point, in the first and second centuries, the Roman Empire was a prosperous, urbanized society. In the third century AD, this stability was shattered by crisis. The empire was torn apart by civil wars, the barbarians became more frightening and epidemics made the whole situation worse. As gladiatorial fighting was an urban phenomenon, it declined at the same time as the cities.

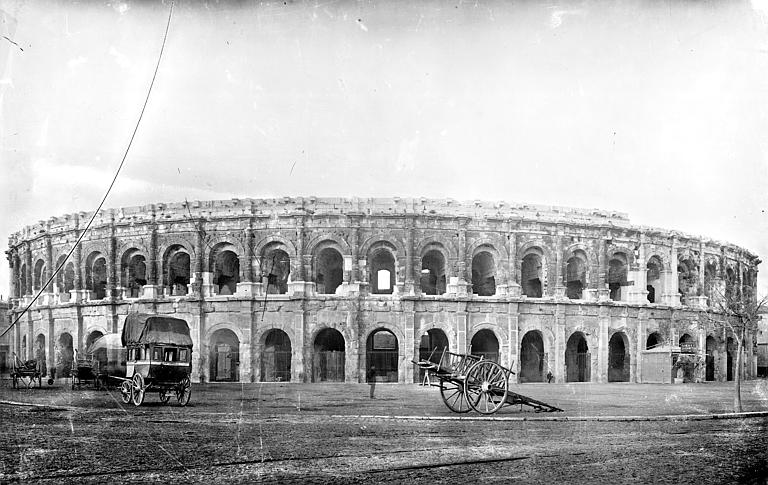
The Arena in the 19th century

From the fourth century, the city of Nîmes began to retract and strengthen its defenses. The arcades of the amphitheatre were blocked up and the monument became an important part of the defence of Nîmes. A large number of people from the town took refuge inside the former amphitheatre that had now become a fortified castle. It suffered several sieges, but the amphitheatre has proved its very effective defence. In 725, Arabs from Spain annihilated the Visigoth kingdom by taking control of Nîmes. Thirty years later, they, in turn, were driven out by the Franks, who themselves finally settled in Nîmes. However, the city was now only a shadow of its former Roman self.

It was not until the 12th century that a new expansion was to occur. As a sign of this renewal, in 1194, the Count of Toulouse authorized its vassals in Nîmes to build a new city wall, whose layout corresponded more or less to the boulevards of the town that we see today. At that time, the amphitheatre was still an important element in the town defense system. A real little neighborhood grew up there, with its own churches of St Peter and St Martin. Gradually, over the course of the 14th century, the amphitheatre lost its military value but remained a residential quarter.

Influenced by the ideas of the Renaissance, King Francis I wanted to get the amphitheatre back its ancient appearance, but all that was done at that time was to clear away the buildings from the first floor gallery. By the 18th century, there were still 150 houses inside the arena with hundreds of people living in them. The clearing of the monument began in 1786 when the houses cluttering it were demolished. Only two walled arcades with their medieval windows have been preserved, opposite the Palace of Justice, providing us with a reminder of that period. In the middle of the 19th century, the architect Henri Revoil completed the restoration of the monument. Since 1853, when the first bullfight took place, the public has once again been able to watch festivities, sporting events, entertainments and bullfights at regular intervals.

The statue of French matador Christian Montcouquiol, known as Nimeño II, stands at the entrance, called "Hero".

In 1853, balloonist M. Louis Deschamps was killed during his 120th flight from the Arena of Nîmes. Bad weather had already forced the mayor to call off a parachute performance, but the balloon took off as planned and got caught in the bad weather. Deschamps was thrown from the basket and the balloon came down about half a mile further along.

== Modern use ==
French New Wave filmmaker François Truffaut filmed part of his first film, Les Mistons, in 1957.

British action-adventure television series Return of the Saint (1978/79) filmed there - S1/E8: The Poppy Chain.

British rock band Dire Straits recorded some of the live video and album, On the Night, in May 1992.

German industrial metal group Rammstein recorded the majority of their DVD, Völkerball, on July 23, 2005.

American heavy metal band Metallica recorded their DVD, Français Pour Une Nuit, on July 7, 2009.

WWE hosted a house show in 2009 and in 2011.

French electronic group Justice recorded live album Access All Arenas on July 19, 2012.

Depeche Mode performed at the Roman amphitheatre three times: on August 8, 1986, during their Black Celebration Tour, on July 20, 2006, during their Touring the Angel, and on July 16, 2013, during their Delta Machine Tour. The 2006 show was recorded for the group's live album project Recording the Angel.

David Gilmour Live in Nîmes - 20th/21st July 2016

The music festival Festival de Nîmes has taken place in the arena every summer since 1997. It celebrated 20 years with a major event in 2017.

The 2017 Vuelta a España included the arena in the route of its opening stage, a 13,7 km (8,51 mile) team time trial, which was won by the BMC Racing Team.

In 2022 German DJ Boris Brejcha performed in the arena at an event organised by Cercle Music. The performance is available on YouTube.

Dua Lipa performed in the arena during her Radical Optimism Tour on June 12 and 13, 2024.

Sting has played six concerts in the arena between 1991 and 2022.

== Gallery ==
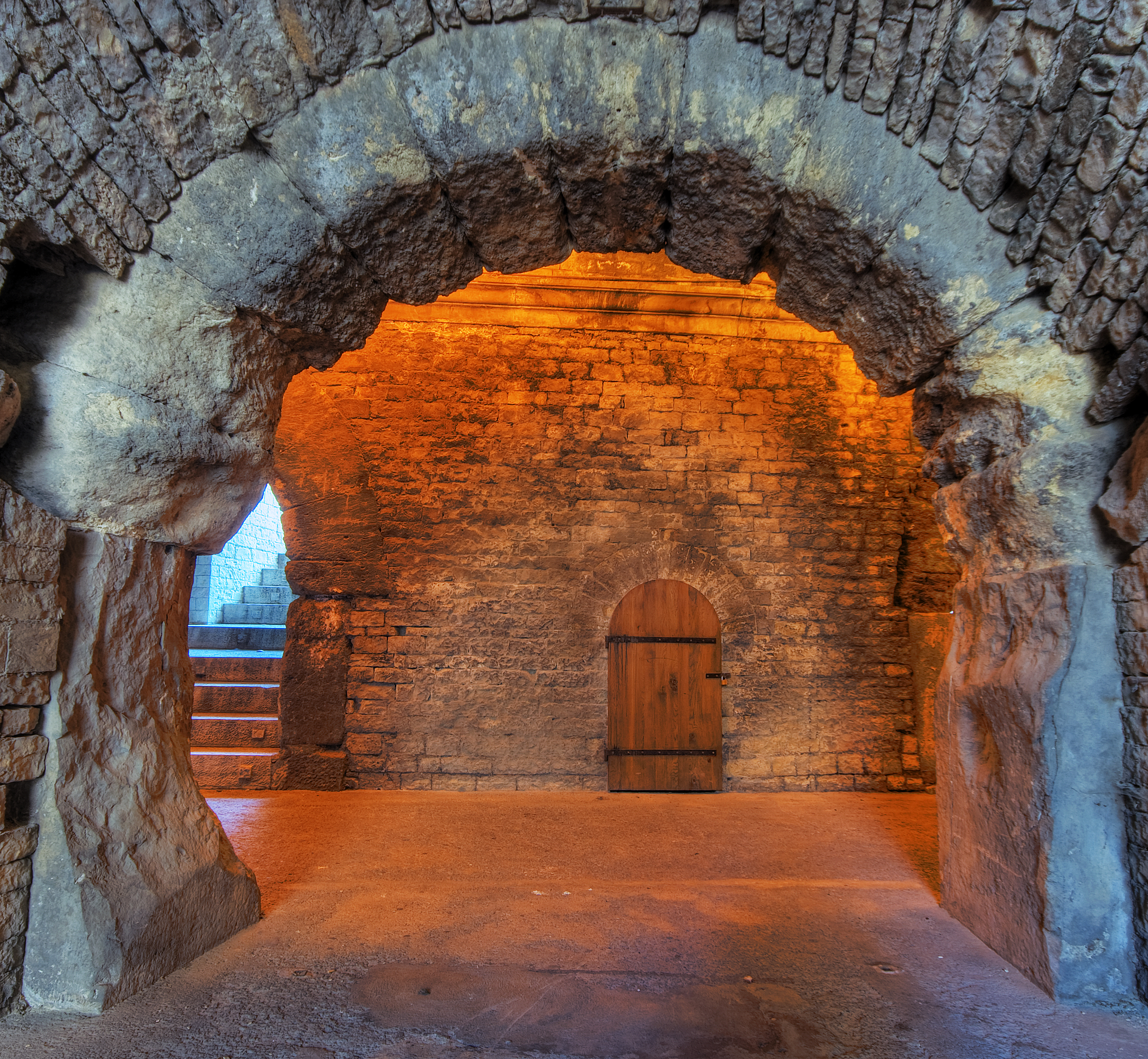
Stairs and corridors

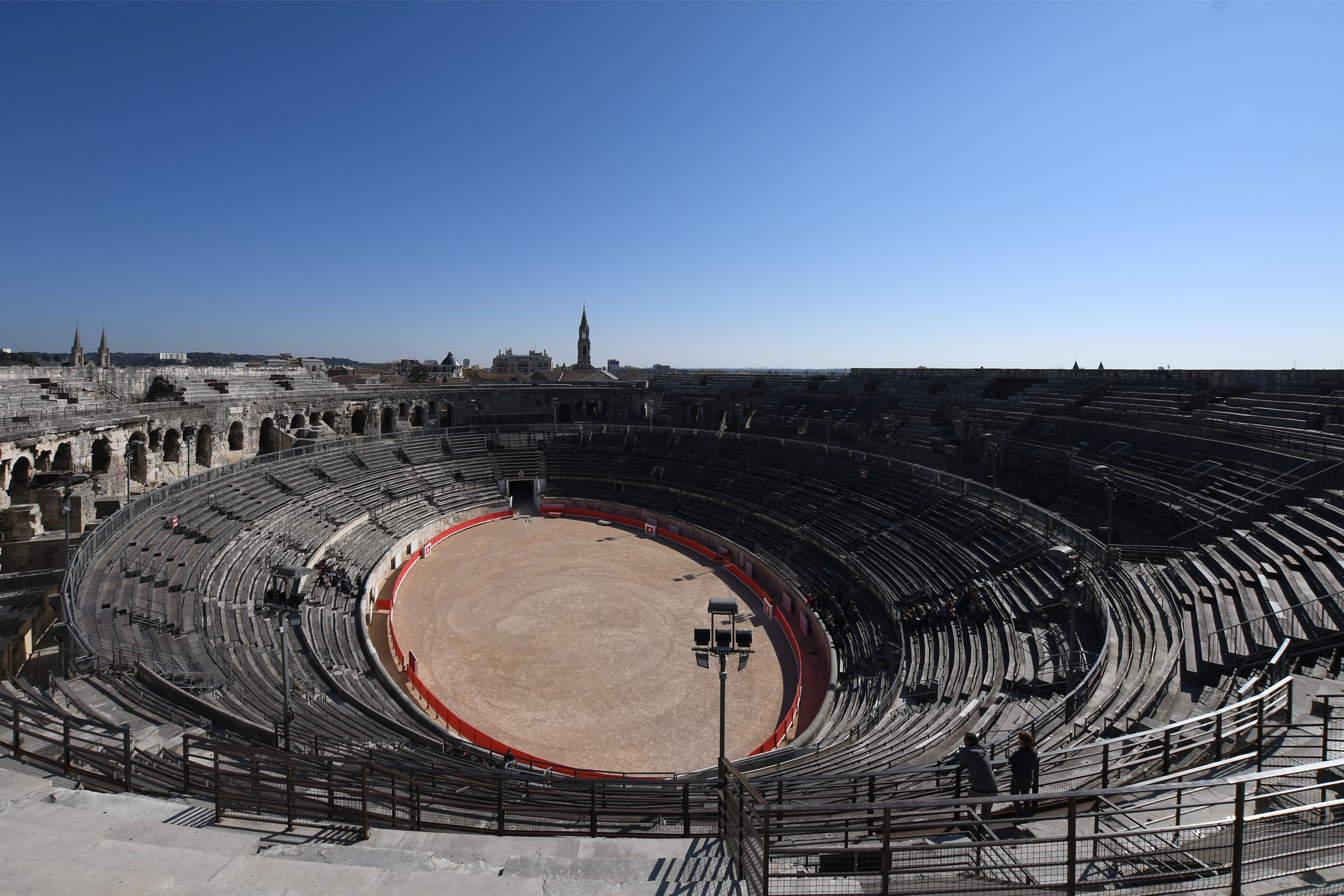
The Arena

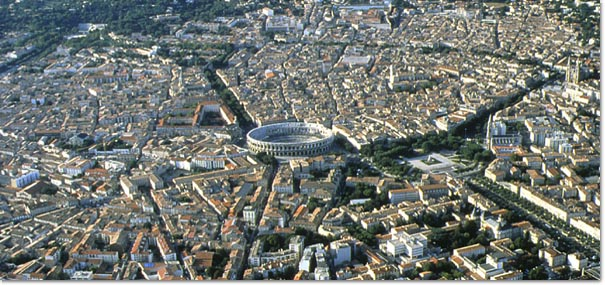
Aerial view of Nîmes with the Arena in the centre

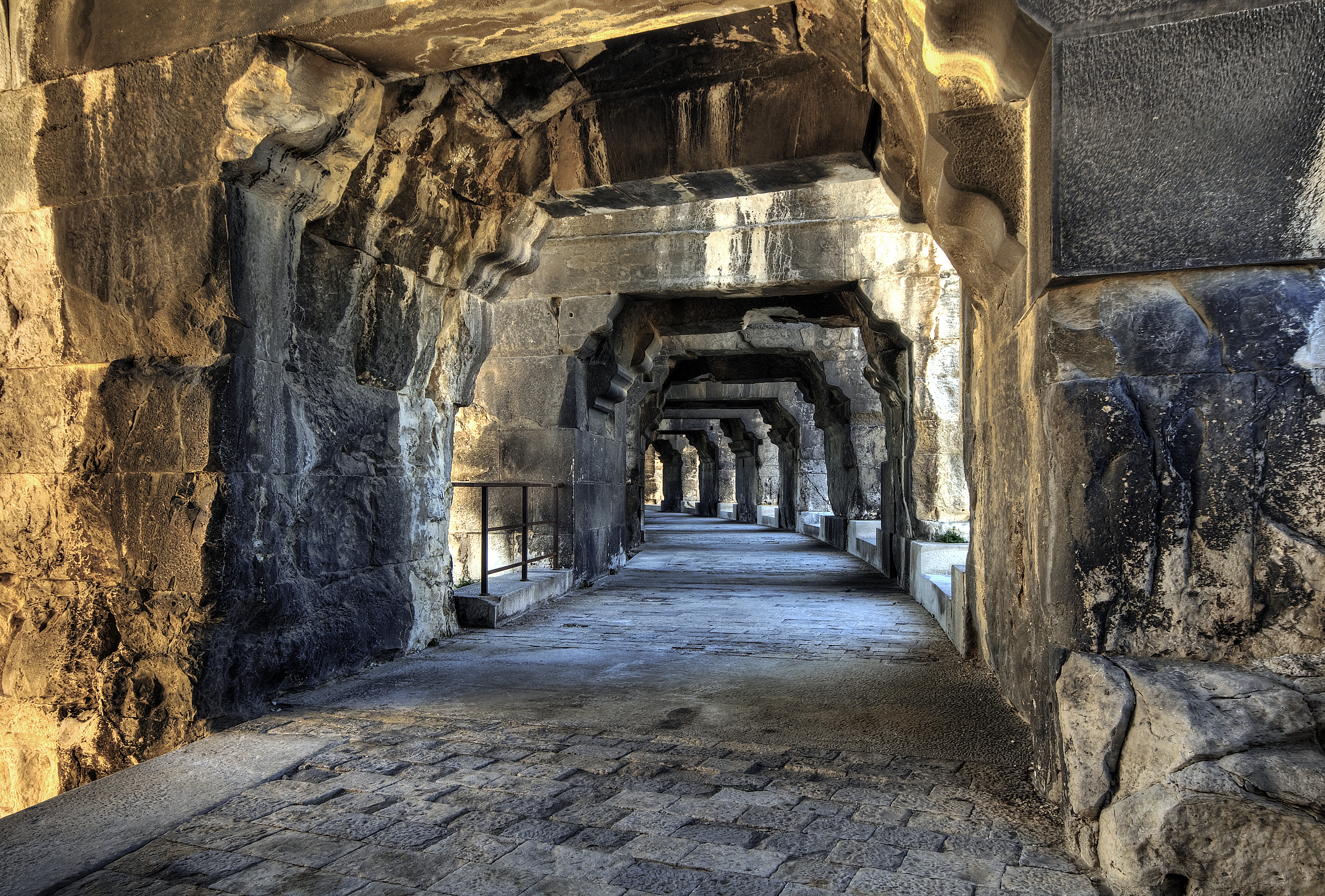
Corridor

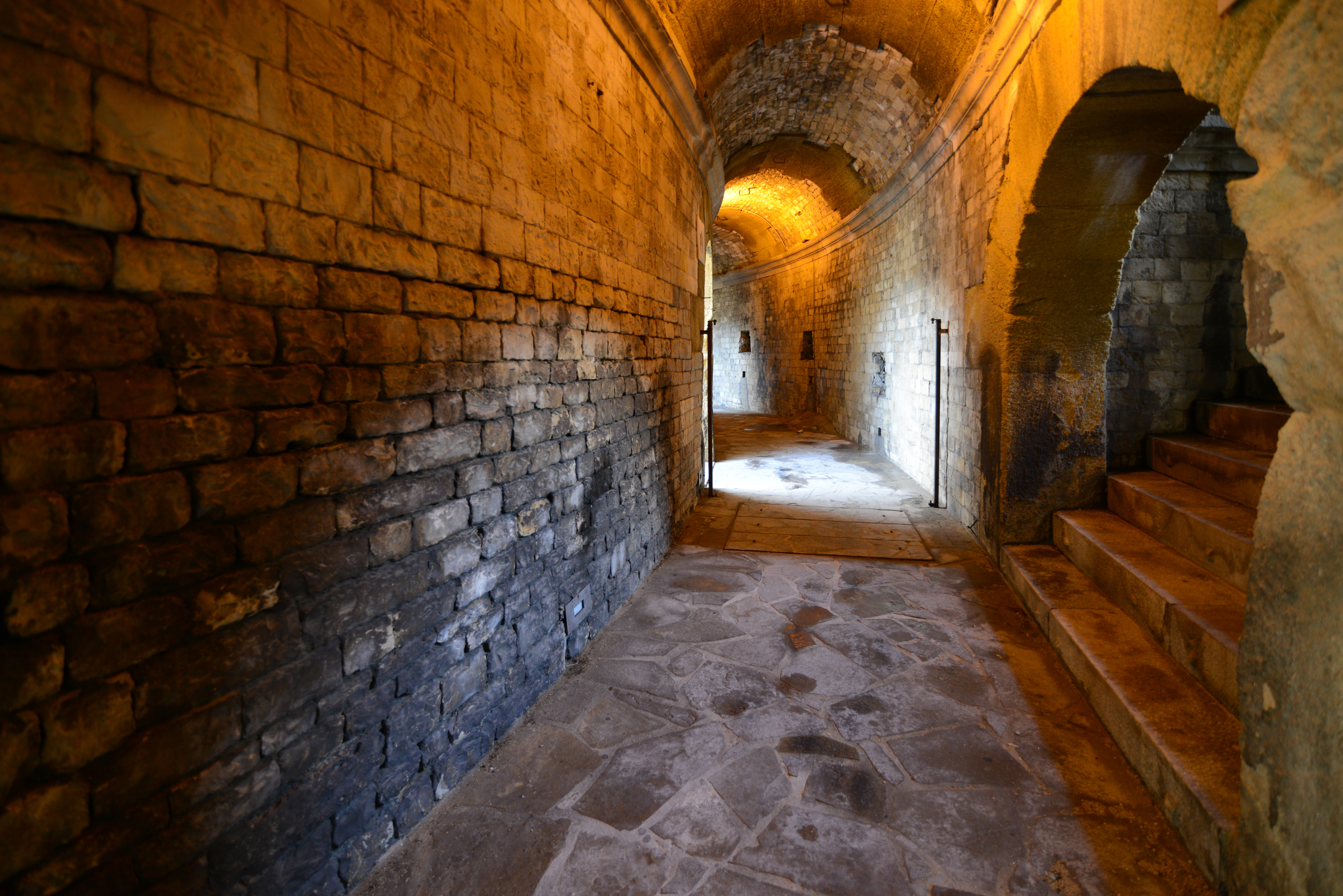
Corridor

== See also ==
- List of Roman amphitheatres
- List of Roman sites
