= Feria de Nîmes =

Bullfighting festival

Coordinates: 43.8348°N 4.3593°E

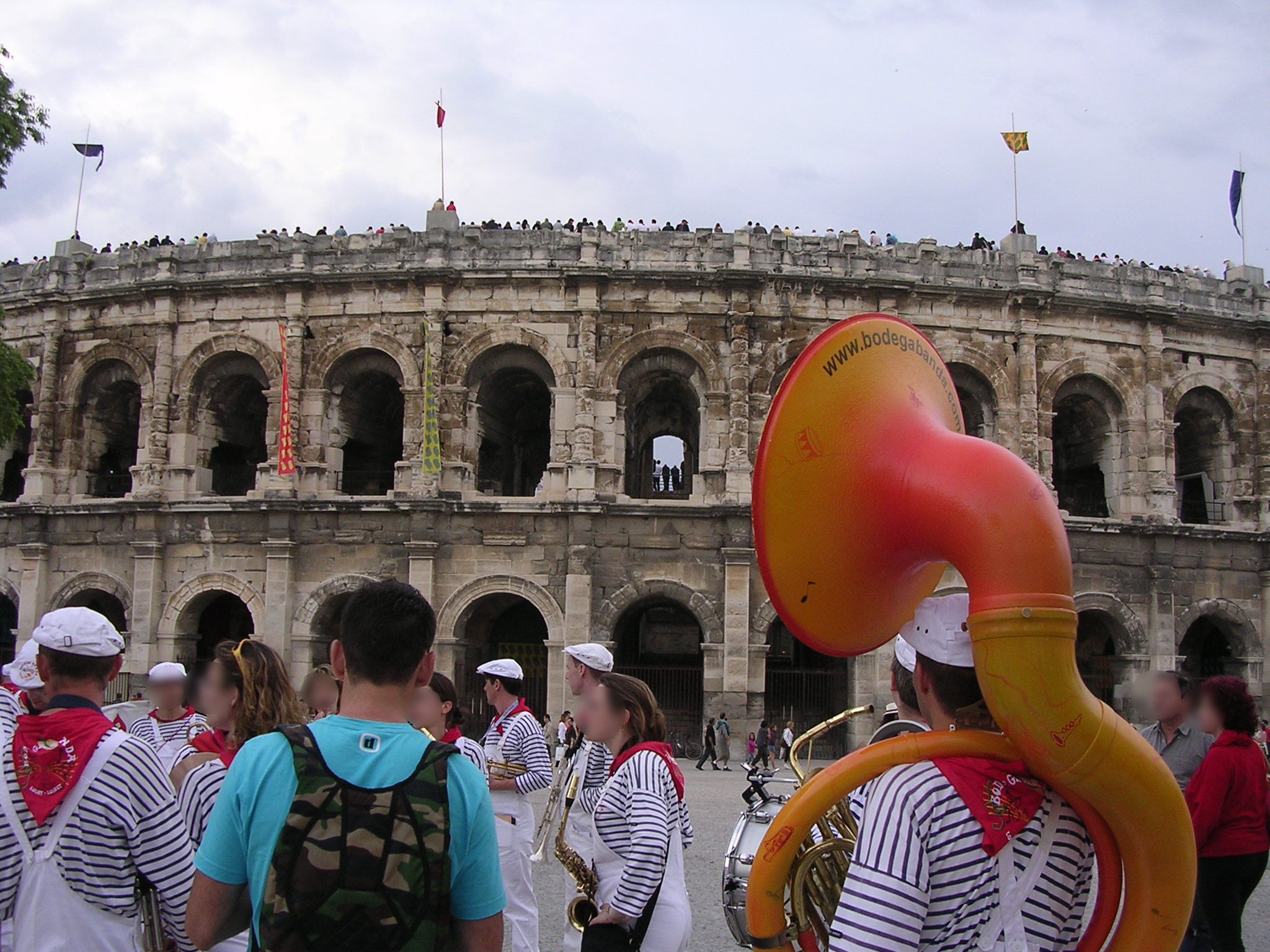
Feria de Nîmes

Arena of Nîmes - Evening

Feria de Nîmes is a popular festival centered on Spanish-style bullfighting held each year in Nîmes, Southern France. In May 2022, the Feria celebrated its 70th anniversary.
