= Nîmes =

Prefecture of Gard, Occitanie, France

Nîmes Nimes (Occitan)
- Prefecture and commune
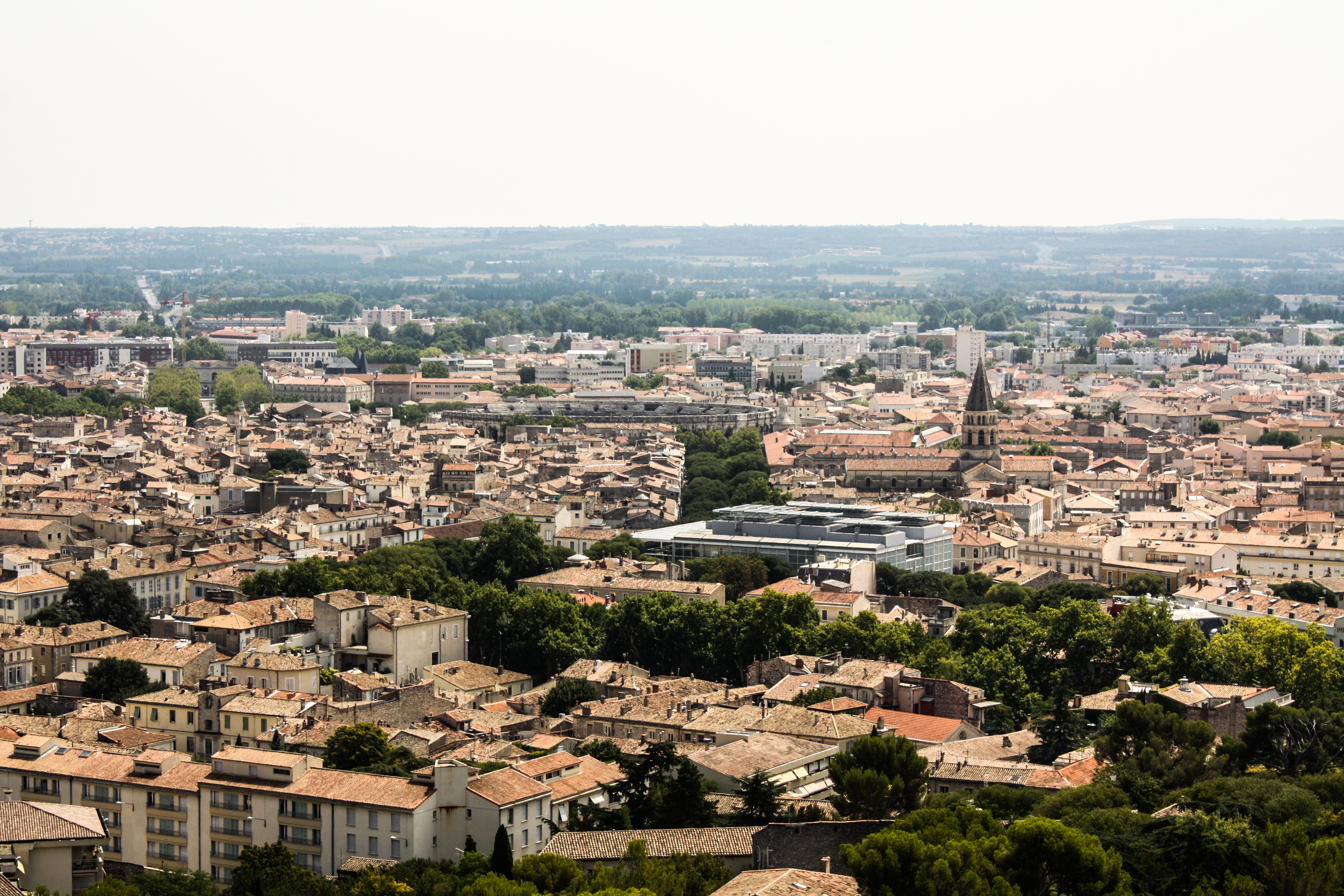
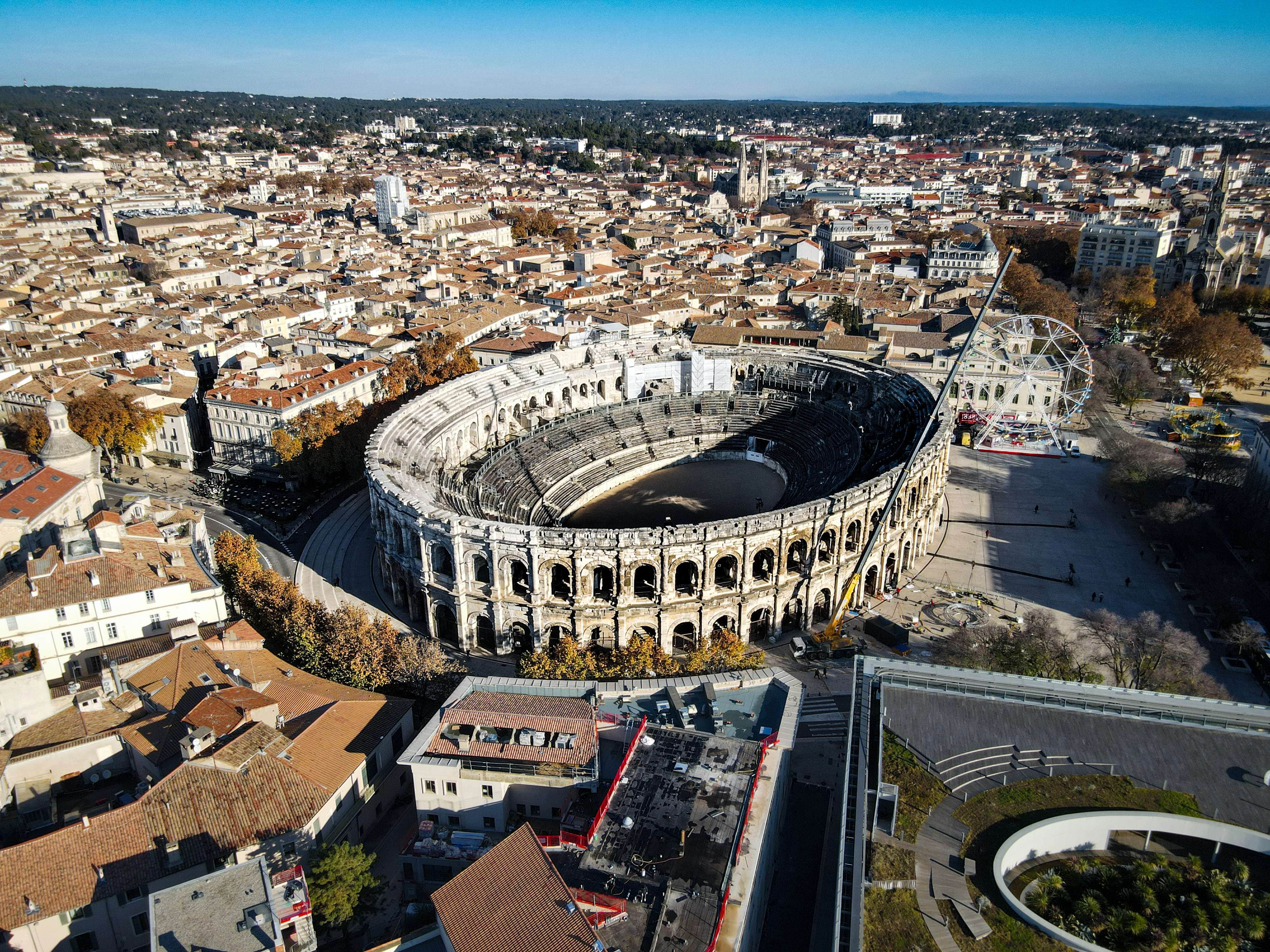
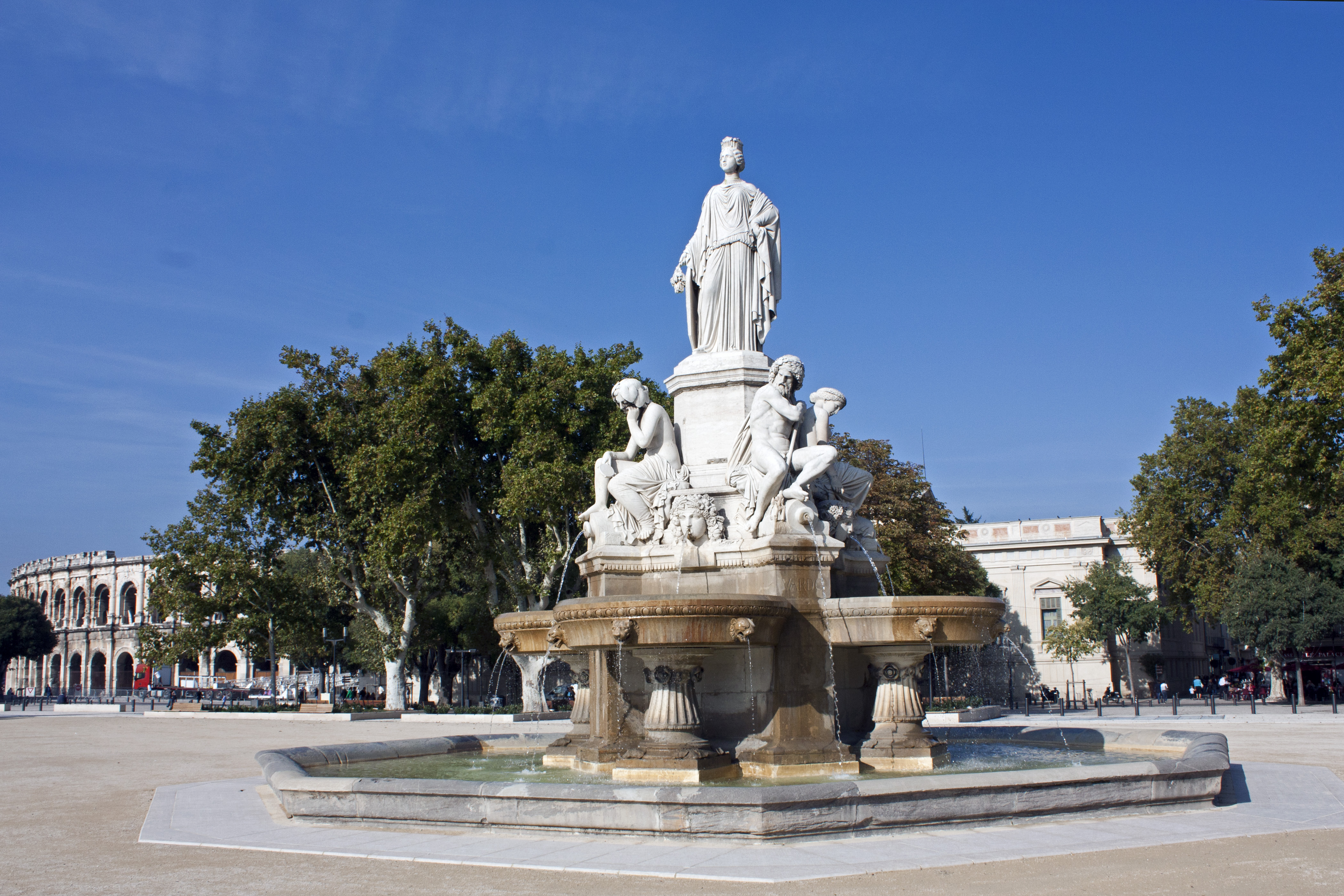
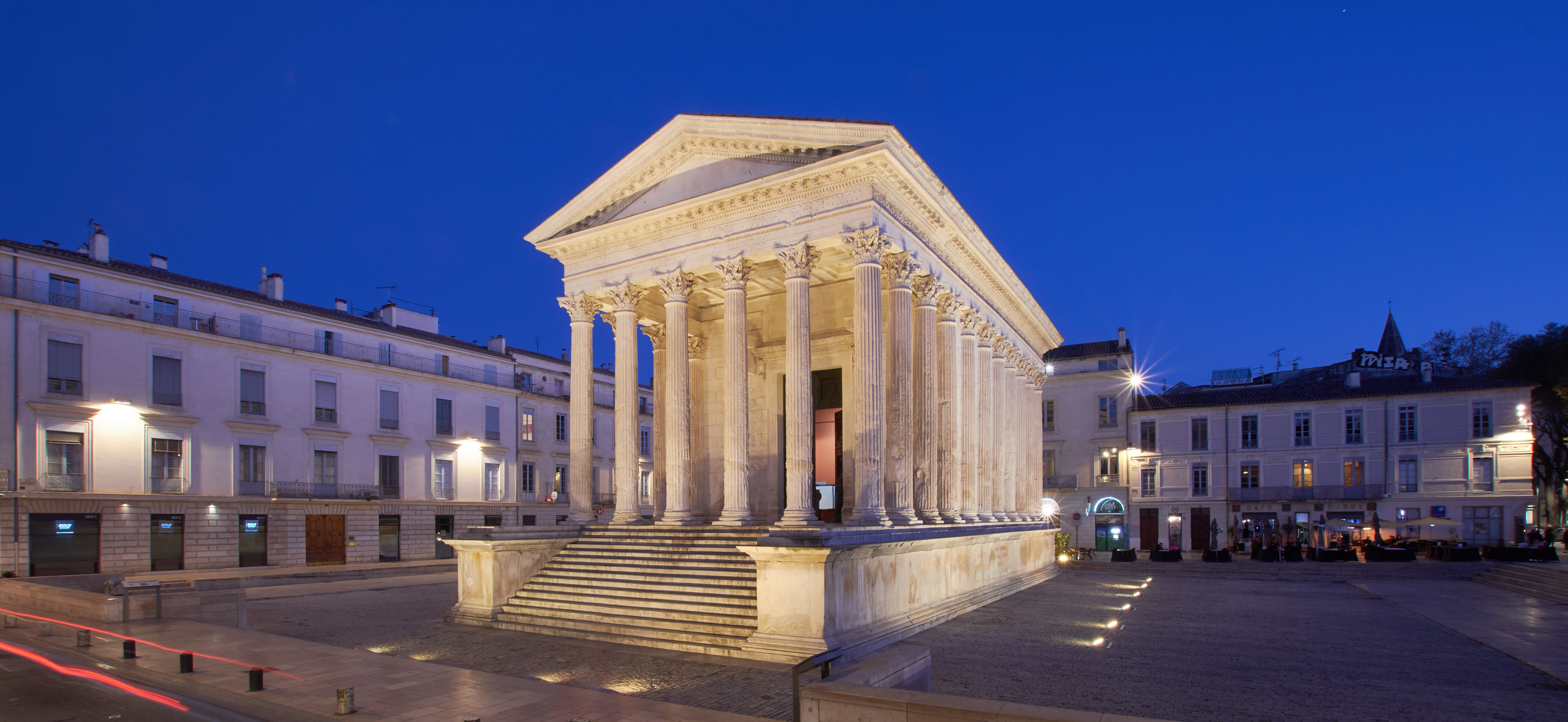
- View of Nîmes from Tour Magne Arena of Nîmes Fontaine Pradier Maison Carrée at night

- Flag Coat of arms
- Location of Nîmes
- Location within France Location within Occitanie
- Coordinates: 43°50′18″N 04°21′35″E
- Country: France
- Region: Occitania
- Department: Gard
- Arrondissement: Nîmes
- Canton: Nîmes-1, 2, 3 and 4 and Saint-Gilles
- Intercommunality: CA Nîmes Métropole

Government
  - Mayor (2026–32): Vincent Bouget (PCF)
- Area^{1}: 161.85 km^{2} (62.49 sq mi)
- Elevation: 39 m (128 ft)
- Highest elevation: 215 m (705 ft)
- Lowest elevation: 21 m (69 ft)
- Population (2023): 151,839
  - Density: 938.15/km^{2} (2,429.8/sq mi)
- Demonyms: French: Nîmois (masculine), Nîmoise (feminine); Occitan: nimesenc (masculine), nimesenca (feminine)
- Time zone: UTC+01:00 (CET)
  - Summer (DST): UTC+02:00 (CEST)
- INSEE/Postal code: 30189 /30000 and 30900
- ^{1} French Land Register data, which excludes lakes, ponds, glaciers > 1 km^{2} (0.386 sq mi or 247 acres) and river estuaries.

Nîmes (Note: /niːm/ NEEM; French: [nim]; Occitan: Nimes [ˈnimes]; Latin: Nemausus.) is the prefecture of the Gard department in the Occitanie region of Southern France. Located between the Mediterranean Sea and the Cévennes mountain range, the estimated population of the commune of Nîmes stood at 148,561 in 2019.

Dubbed "the most Roman city outside Italy", Nîmes has a rich history dating back to the Roman Empire when the city's population was estimated at approximately 50,000–60,000. Since several famous monuments and ancient Roman buildings are located in Nîmes, including the Arena of Nîmes and the Maison Carrée, the city is often referred to as the "French Rome".

== Origins ==
Nîmes is situated where the alluvial plain of the Vistrenque River abuts the hills of Mont Duplan to the northeast, Montaury to the southwest, and to the west Mt. Cavalier and the knoll of Canteduc.

The ancient name Nemausus appears in Gaulish inscriptions as dede matrebo Namausikabo ("he has given to the mothers of Nîmes") and toutios Namausatis ("citizen of Nîmes"). The god Nemausus who shares his name with the city is found also in Latin inscriptions located in the territory of the Volcae Arecomici around Nîmes.

== History ==
=== 4000–2000 BCE ===
The Neolithic site of Serre Paradis reveals the presence of semi-nomadic cultivators in the period 4000 to 3500 BCE on the site of Nîmes.

The menhir of Courbessac (or La Poudrière) stands in a field, near the aerodrome. This limestone monolith of over 2 metres (6.6 ft) in height dates to approximately 2500 BCE, and is considered the oldest monument in Nîmes.

=== 1800–600 BCE ===
The Bronze Age has left traces of villages that were made out of huts and branches. The population of the site increased during the Bronze Age.

=== 600–121 BCE ===
The hill of Mt. Cavalier was the site of the early oppidum, which gave birth to the city. During the 3rd and 2nd centuries BCE, a surrounding wall was built with a dry-stone tower at the summit, which was later incorporated into the Tour Magne.

The Greek geographer, Strabo, mentioned that this town functioned as the regional capital for the Volcae Arecomici, a Celtic people. The city adopted the name of a local water deity, Nemausus. The town had a healing spring.

The Warrior of Grezan is considered to be the most ancient indigenous sculpture in southern Gaul.

In 123 BCE, the Roman general Quintus Fabius Maximus launched a campaign against Gallic tribes in the area, eventually defeating the Allobroges and the Arverni, while the Volcae offered no resistance. The Roman province Gallia Transalpina ("Gaul across the Alps") was established in 121 BCE, and from 118 BCE, the Via Domitia was constructed through the later site of the city.

=== Roman period ===
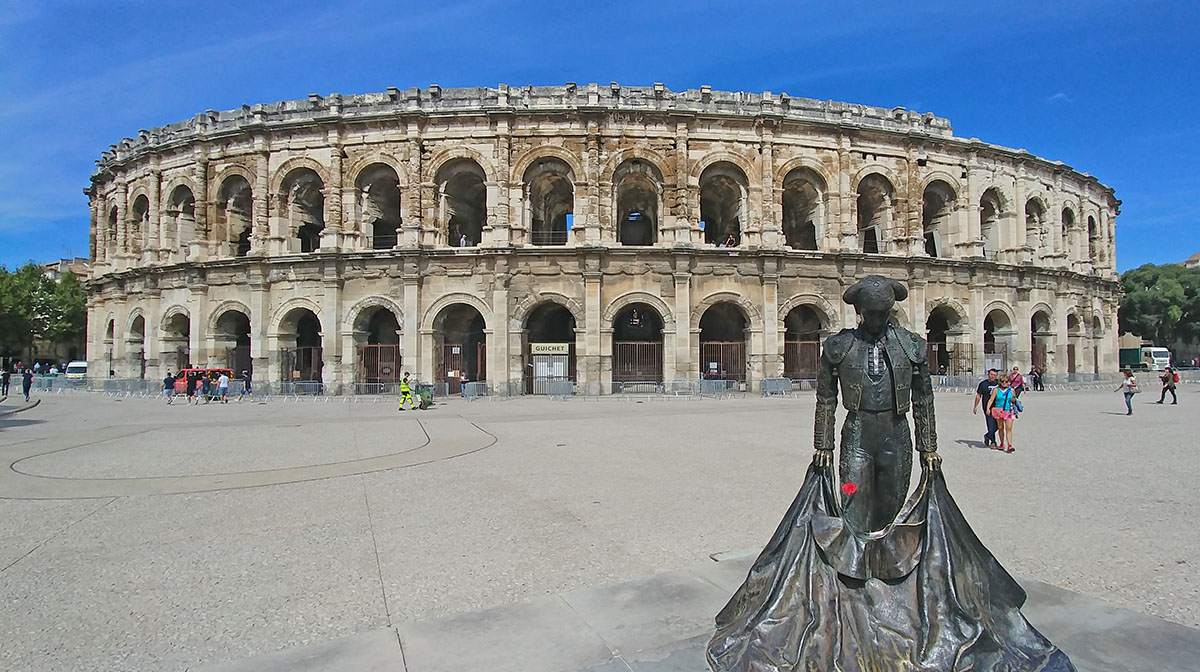
Amphitheater, used today for concerts and bullfights

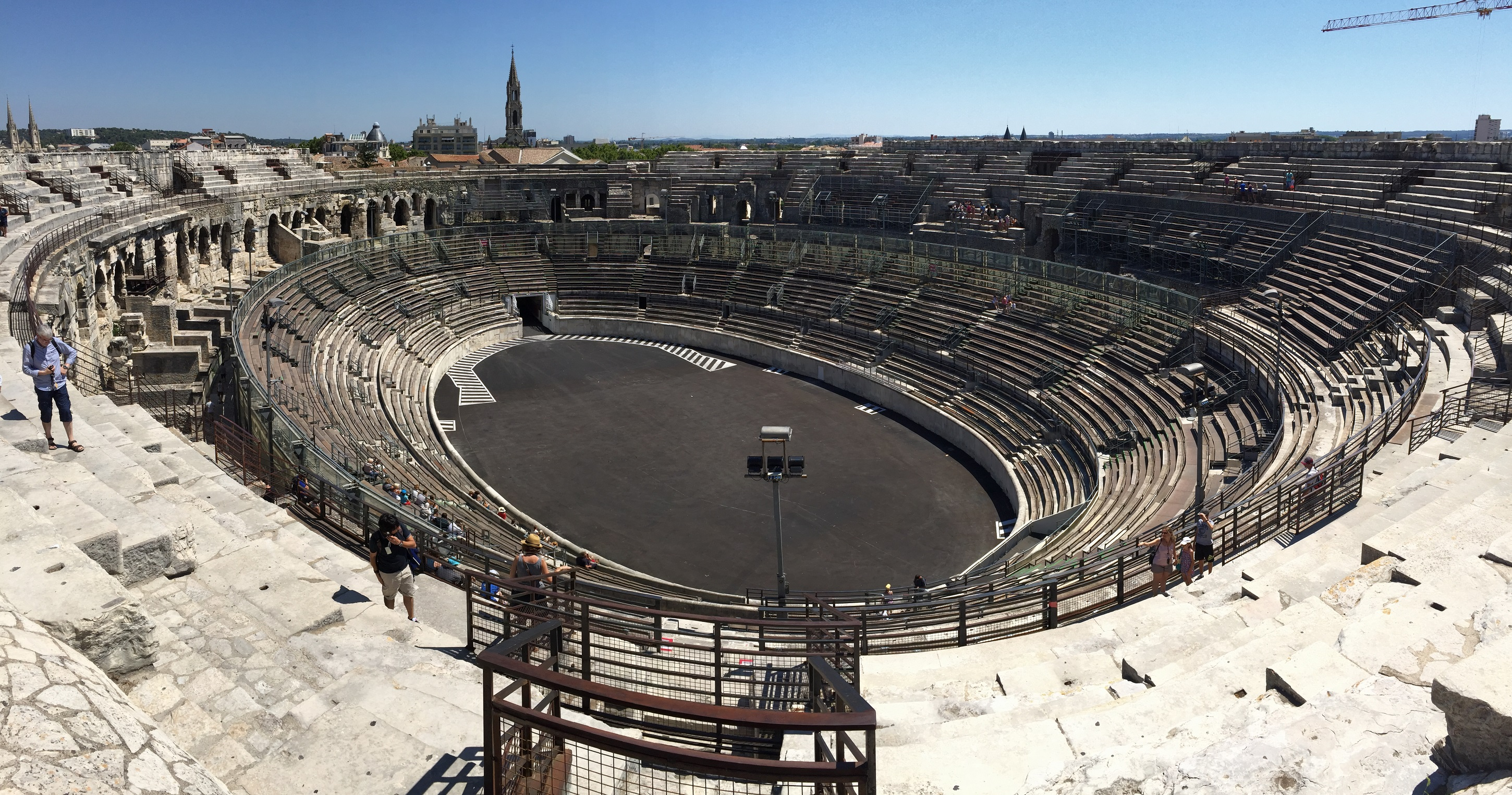
Amphiteatre Interior

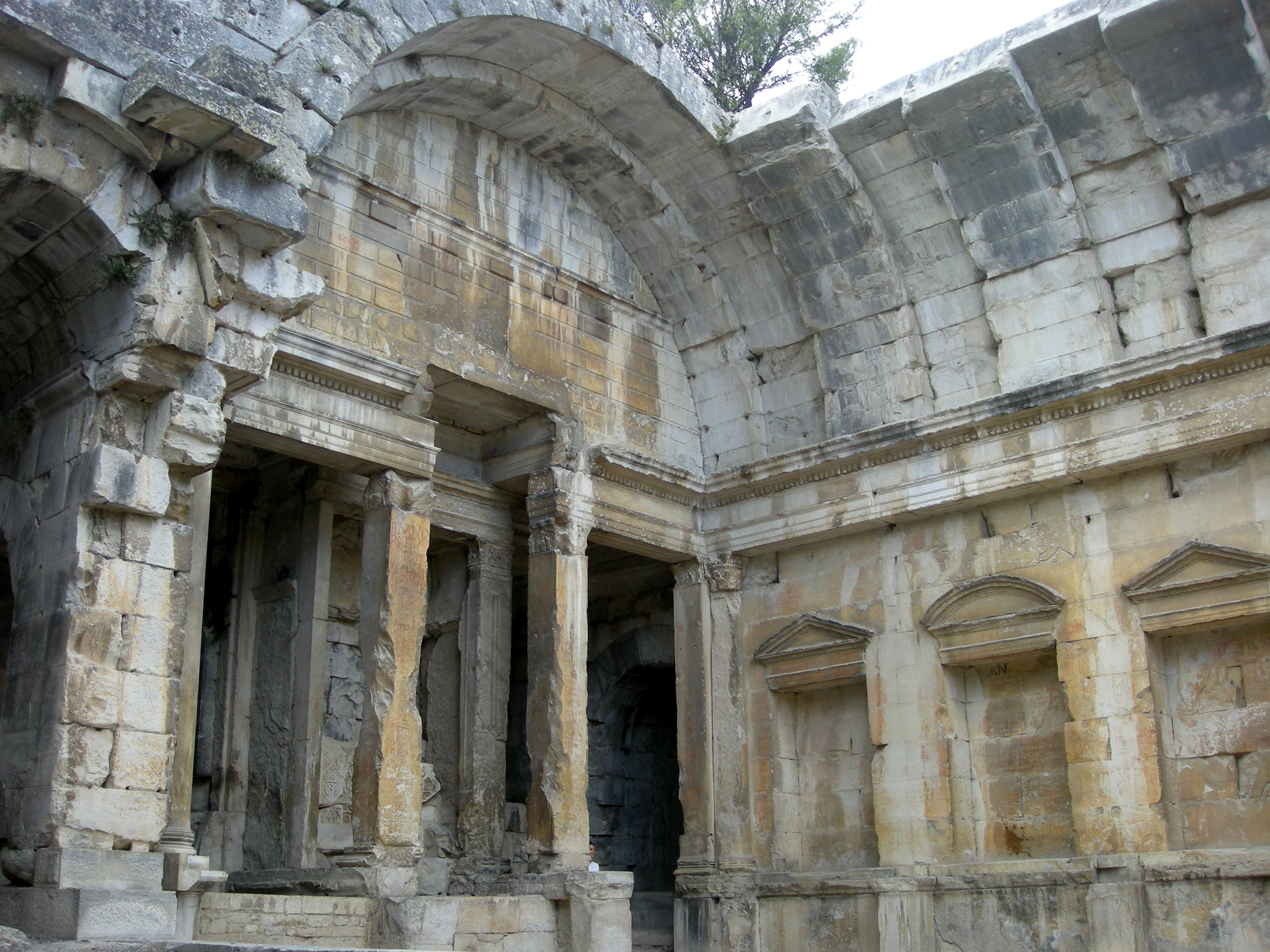
Temple of Diana

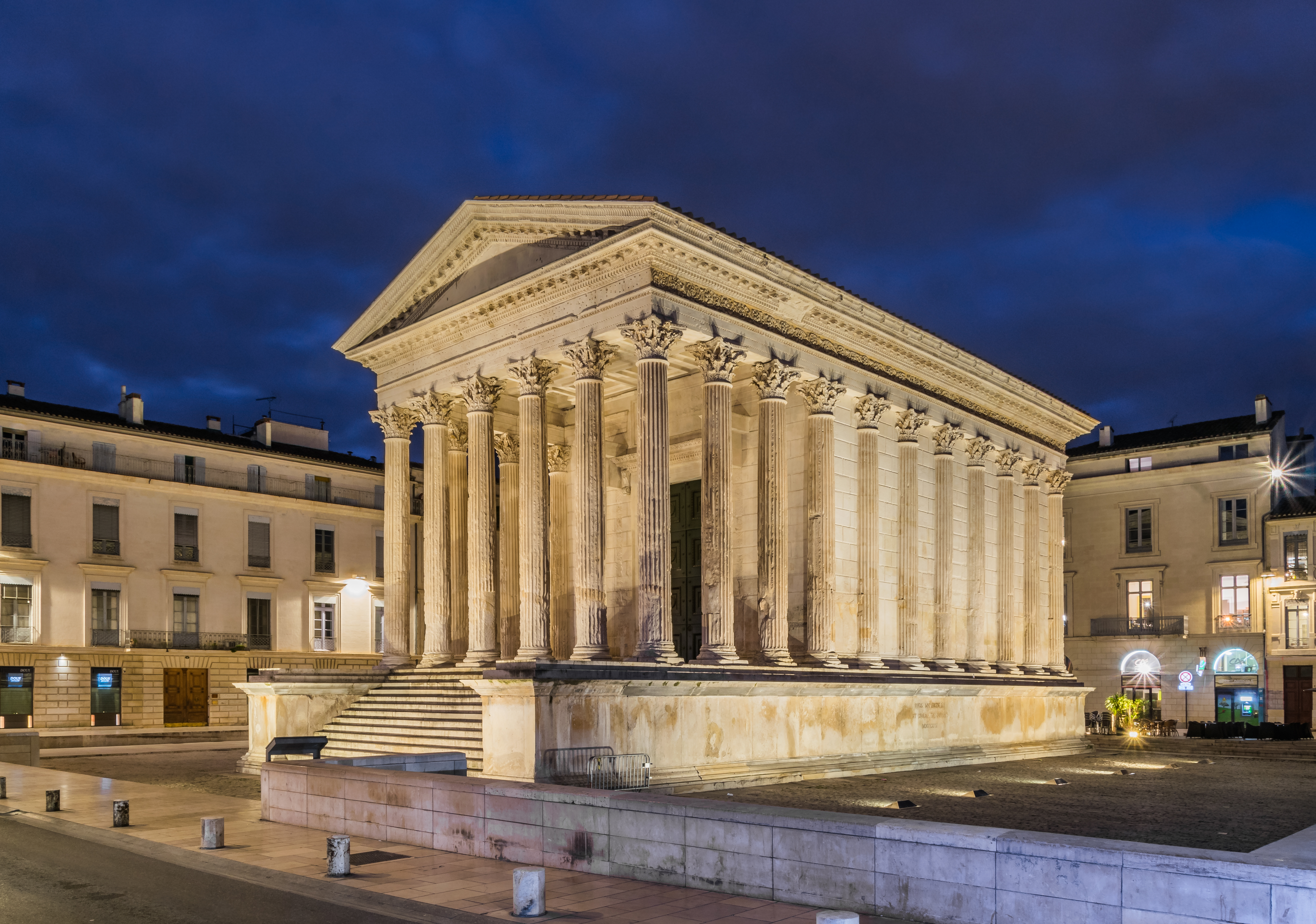
Roman temple, the Maison Carrée

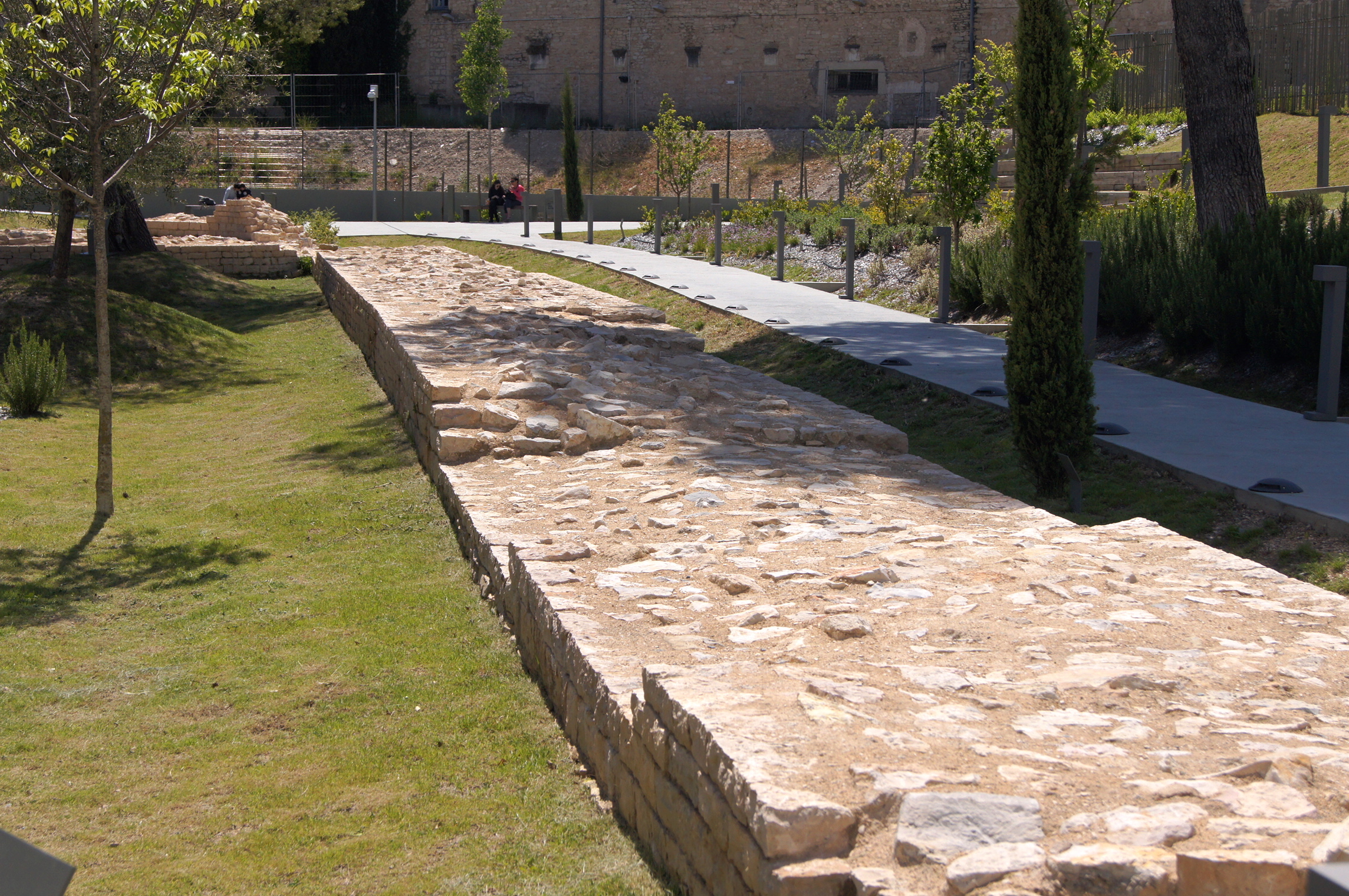
Roman wall foundations

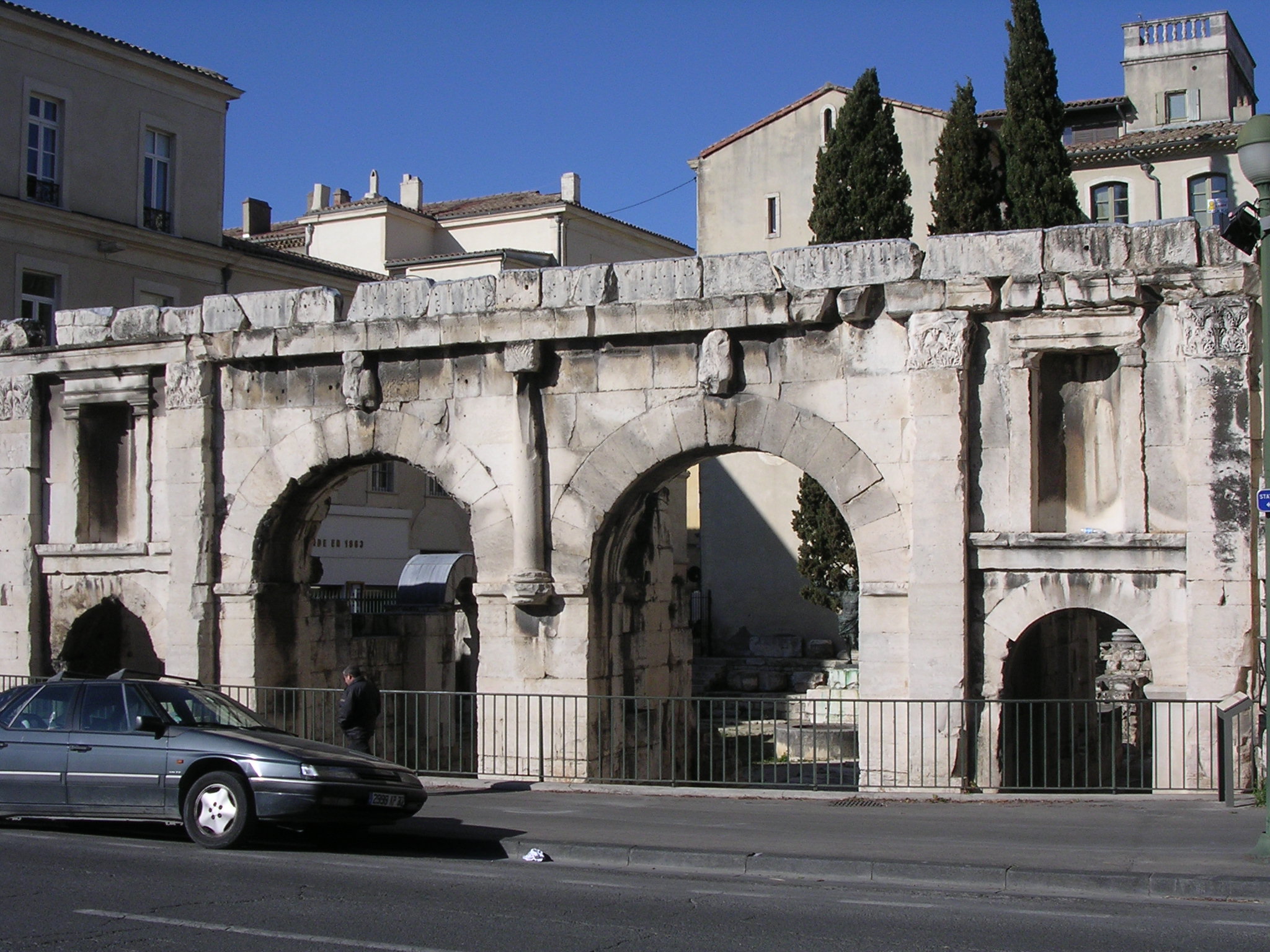
The Augustan Gate

The city arose on the important Via Domitia which connected Italy with Hispania.

Nîmes became a Roman colony as Colonia Nemausus sometime before 28 BCE, as witnessed by the earliest coins, which bear the abbreviation NEM. COL. Veterans of Julius Caesar's legions in his Nile campaigns were given plots of land to cultivate on the plain of Nîmes.

Augustus launched a major construction program in the city, as elsewhere throughout the Roman empire. Additionally, he ordered the construction of a 6 kilometres (3.7 mi) long ring of ramparts in the city, reinforced by 14 towers; two gates remain today: the Porte d'Auguste, and the Porte de France. Internally, the city was organized around the cardo and decumanus, intersecting at the forum. The Maison Carrée ("Square House"), an exceptionally well-preserved temple dating from the late 1st century BCE, stands as one of the finest surviving examples of Roman temple architecture. Dedicated to Roma and Augustus, it bears a striking resemblance to Rome's Temple of Portunus, blending Etruscan and Greek design influences.

The Nîmes Aqueduct, many of whose remains can be seen today outside of the city, was built to bring water from the hills to the north. Where it crossed the river Gard between Uzès and Remoulins, the Pont du Gard was built. This is 20 km (12 mi) northeast of the city.

The museum accommodates numerous fine objects discovered during excavations in the city and its surrounding area, including mosaic floors, frescoes and sculpture from wealthy houses and other buildings. Furthermore, it is known that the town had a civil basilica, a curia, a gymnasium, and perhaps a circus. The amphitheatre is very well preserved, dates from the end of the 2nd century, and was one of the largest amphitheatres in the Empire. The so-called Temple of Diana, dating from Augustus and rebuilt in the 2nd century, was actually not a temple but was centred on a nymphaeum located within the Fontaine Sanctuary dedicated to Augustus and may have actually served as a library.

The city was the birthplace of the family of Emperor Antoninus Pius (138-161).

Emperor Constantine (306-337) endowed the city with baths.

It became the seat of the Diocesan Vicar, the chief administrative officer of southern Gaul.

The town was prosperous until the end of the 3rd century, when successive barbarian invasions slowed its development. During the 4th and 5th centuries, the nearby town of Arles enjoyed more prosperity. In the early 5th century, the Praetorian Prefecture was moved from Trier in northeast Gaul to Arles.

The Visigoths captured the city in 472.

Finds from Roman Nîmes in the Musée de la Romanité

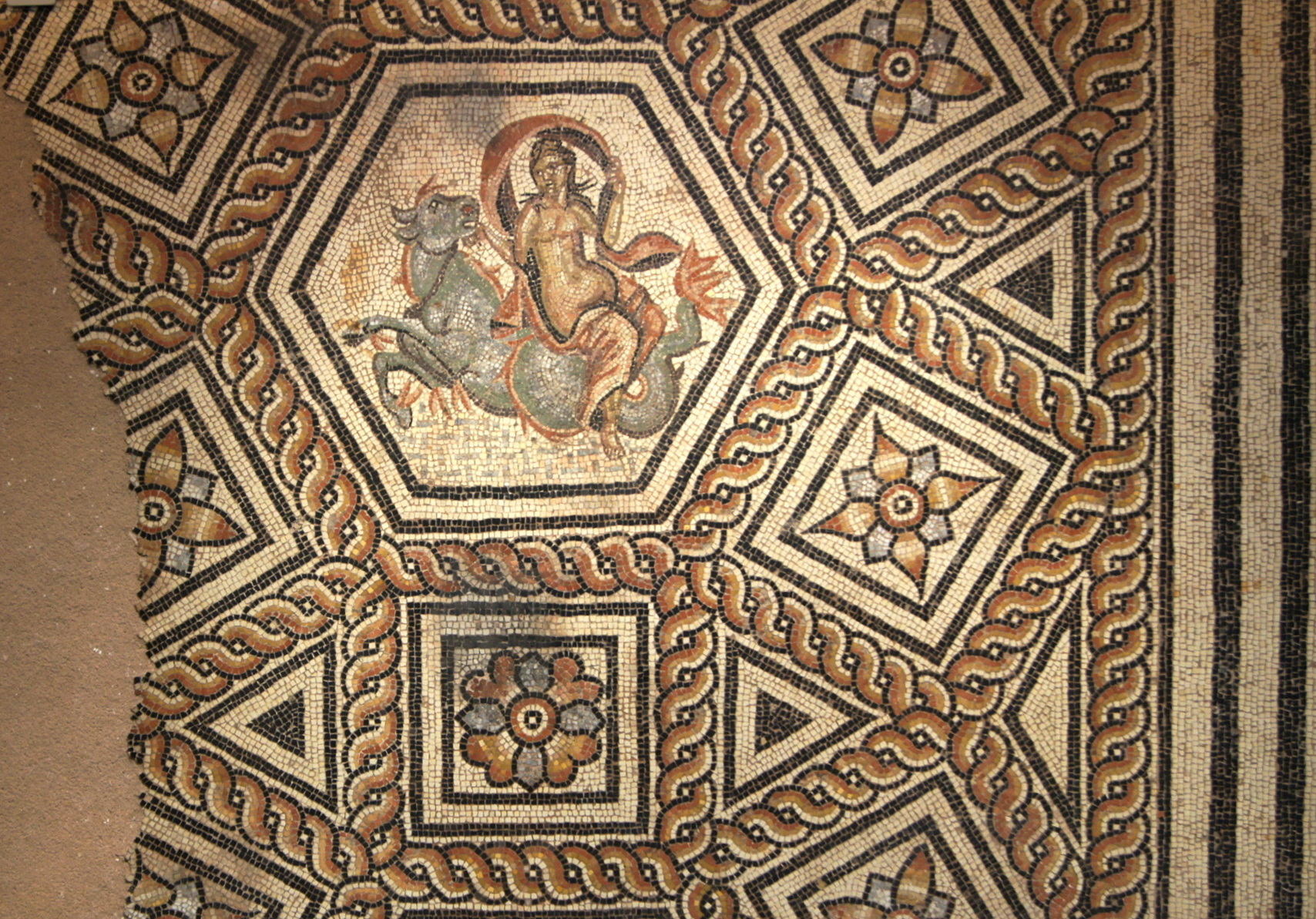
Mosaic of Europa and Zeus

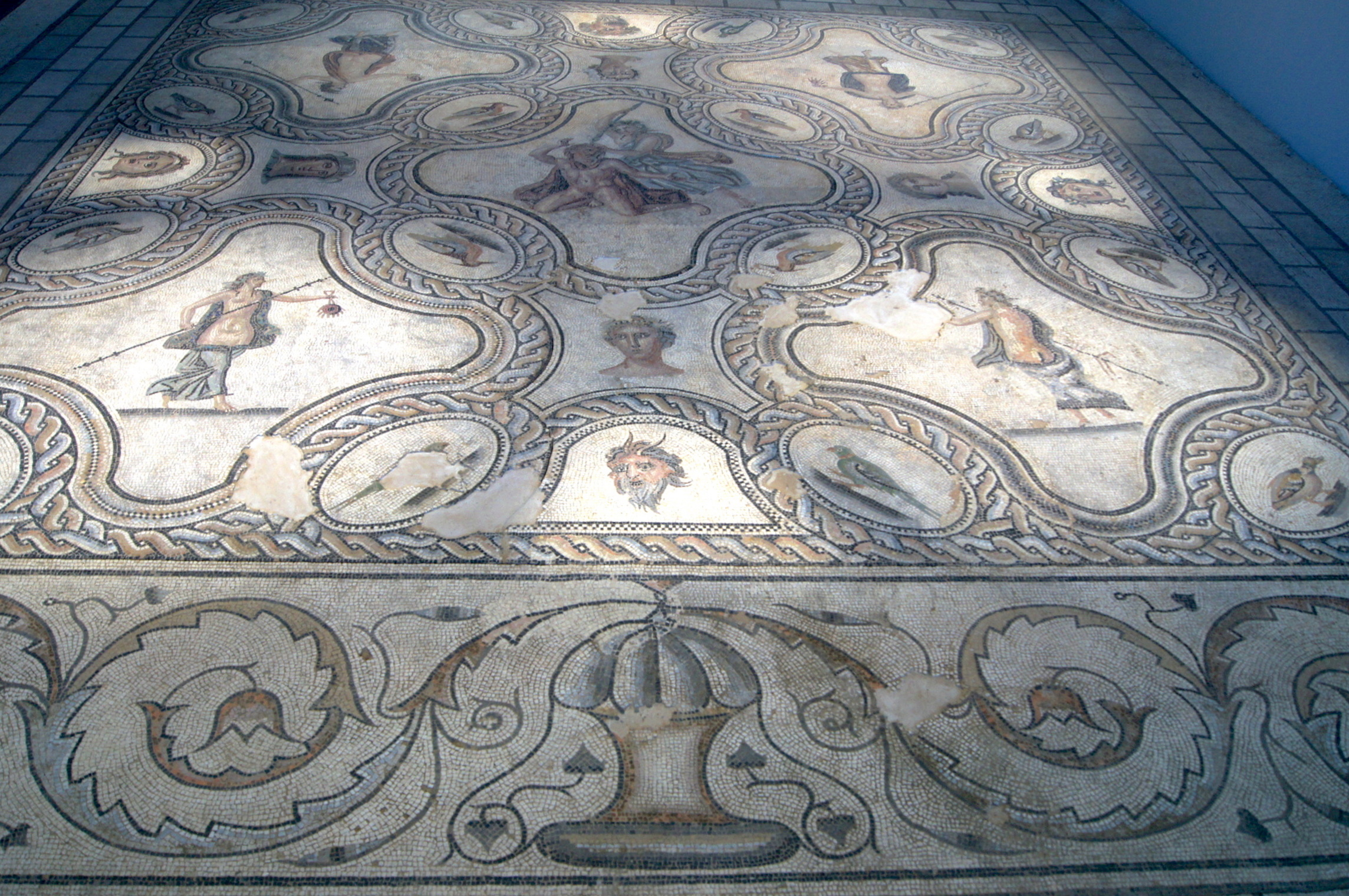
Pentheus mosaic

==== 4th–13th centuries ====
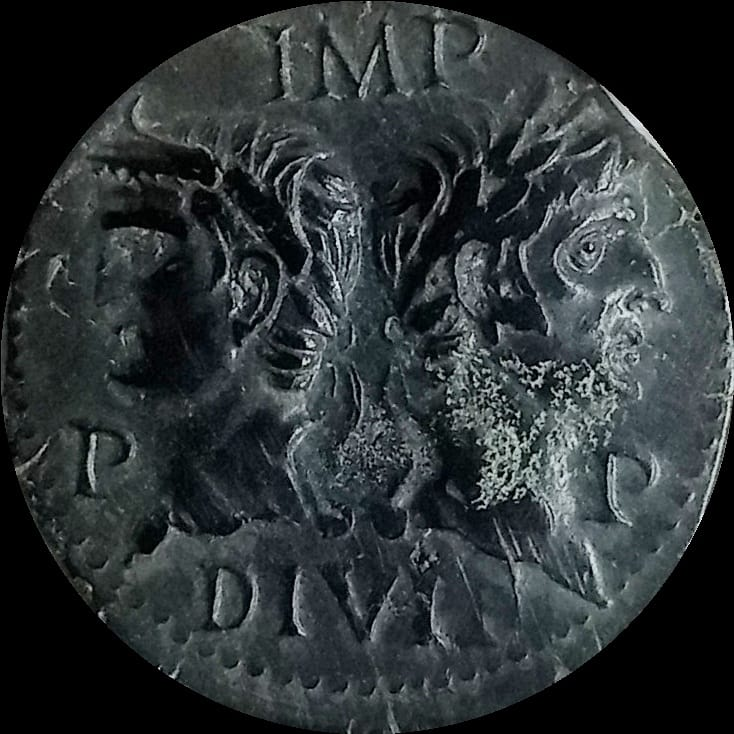
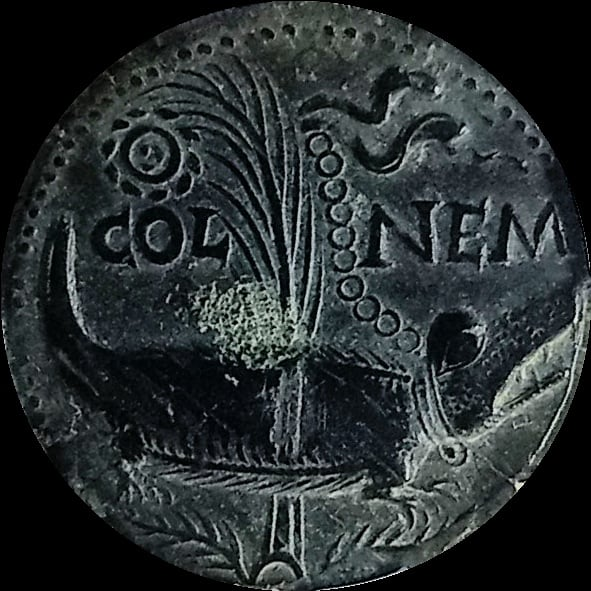
Nîmes, dupondius of Augustus, 10–14 A.D.,commemorating the conquest of Egypt in 30 BC.

Obverse: Back to back head of Agrippa left wearing rostral crown, and laureate head of Augustus right; on either side, inscription. Above and below, inscription. Border of dots. Lettering: "IMP P P DIVI F" ("IMPerator DIVI Filius Pater Patriæ", Emperor, Son of the Divine Father of the Nation).

Reverse: Crocodile to right, chained by neck to a palm-tree with tip bending left, two short palms on either side of trunk; on right, inscription; on left, inscription surmounted by a crown with two long tails to right. Border of dots. Lettering: "COL NEM" ("Colonia Nemausus", Colony of Nemausus)

When the Visigoths were accepted into the Roman Empire, Nîmes was included in their territory in 472, even after the Frankish victory at the Battle of Vouillé (507). The urban landscape went through transformation with the Goths, but much of the heritage of the Roman era remained largely intact.

By 725, the Muslim Umayyads had conquered the whole Visigothic territory of Septimania including Nîmes. In 736–737, Charles Martel and his brother led an expedition to Septimania and Provence, and largely destroyed the city (in the hands of Umayyads allied with the local Gallo-Roman and Gothic nobility), including the amphitheatre, thereafter heading back north. The Muslim government came to an end in 752, when Pepin the Short captured the city. In 754, an uprising took place against the Carolingian king, but was put down, and count Radulf, a Frank, appointed as master of the city. After the events connected with the war, Nîmes was now only a shadow of the opulent Roman city it had once been. The local authorities installed themselves in the remains of the amphitheatre.

Excavations in Nîmes have revealed three medieval graves that represent the earliest archaeological evidence of a Muslim presence in France. Multidisciplinary analyses, including anthropological and palaeogenomic studies of the remains, indicate that the burials followed Islamic rites and date to between 720 and 752 AD.

In the 7th century, the Jewish community in Nîmes grew significantly after Count Hildéric welcomed Jewish families fleeing persecution during the Visigothic period in Spain. This established a long-standing Jewish presence in the city, which later led to the establishment of the first documented synagogue in 1089, located in the heart of the medieval Jewish quarter.

Carolingian rule brought relative peace, but feudal times in the 12th century brought local troubles, which lasted until the days of St. Louis. During that period Nîmes was jointly administered by a bishop, as well as by a civil authority headquartered in the old amphitheater, where lived the Viguier ("Magistrate"), as well as the Viguier's retainers, the Knights of the Arena. Meanwhile the city was represented by four Consuls, whose offices were located in the old Maison Carrée.

Despite incessant squabbling between competing feudal lords, Nîmes saw some progress both in commerce and industry as well as in stock-breeding and associated activities. After the last effort by Raymond VII of Toulouse, St. Louis managed to establish royal power in the region which became Languedoc. Nîmes thus finally came into the hands of the King of France.

=== Period of invasions ===
During the 14th and 15th centuries the Rhône Valley underwent an uninterrupted series of invasions which ruined the economy and caused famine. Customs were forgotten, religious troubles developed (see French Wars of Religion) and epidemics affected the city. Nîmes, which was one of the Protestant strongholds, felt the full force of repression and fratricidal confrontations (including the Michelade massacre) which continued until the middle of the 17th century, adding to the misery of periodic outbreaks of plague.

=== 17th century to the French Revolution ===
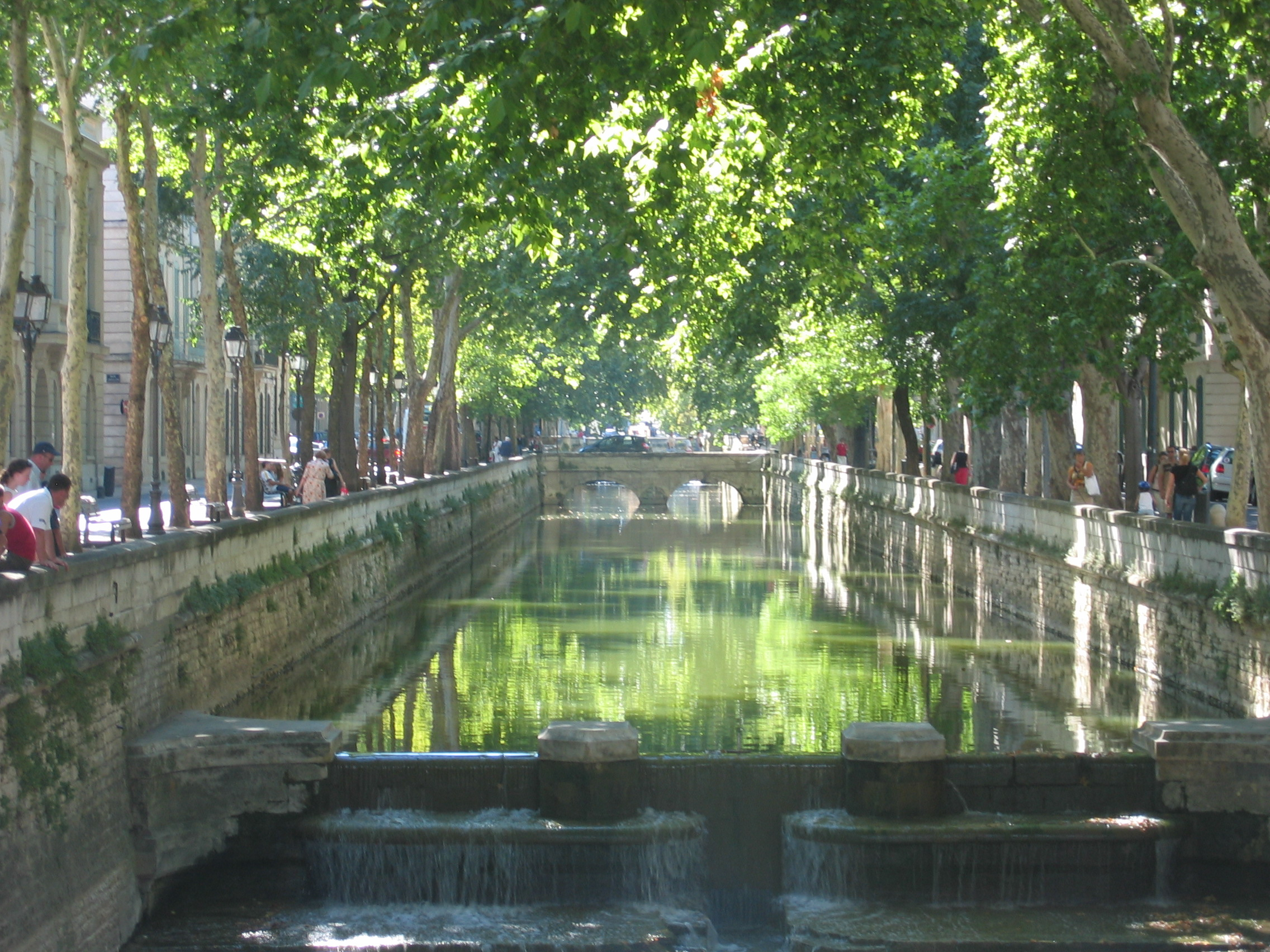
Les Quais de la Fontaine, the embankments of the spring that provided water for the city, the first civic gardens of France, were laid out in 1738–1755.

In the middle of the 17th century Nîmes experienced a period of prosperity. Population growth caused the town to expand, and slum housing to be replaced. To this period also belong the reconstruction of Notre-Dame-Saint-Castor, the Bishop's palace and numerous mansions (hôtels). This renaissance strengthened the manufacturing and industrial potential of the city, the population rising from 21,000 to 50,000 inhabitants.

In this same period the Fountain gardens, the Quais de la Fontaine, were laid out, the areas surrounding the Maison Carrée and the Amphitheatre were cleared of encroachments, whilst the entire population benefited from the atmosphere of prosperity.

In 1793, Jewish textile merchants who had migrated from Carpentras established a new synagogue, modeling its design after the distinctive synagogues of the Comtat Venaissin. This building has remained the religious and cultural center for the Jewish community of the Gard department to this day.

Nîmes is renowned for the creation of serge de Nîmes, the twill-woven fabric that would later become known globally as denim. This textile innovation later served as the basis for the development of modern blue jeans, patented in 1873 by Jewish-American entrepreneur Levi Strauss.

=== From the French Revolution to the present ===
Following a European economic crisis that hit Nîmes with full force, the Revolutionary period awoke the slumbering demons of political and religious antagonism. The White Terror added to natural calamities and economic recession, produced murder, pillage and arson until 1815. Order was however restored in the course of the century, and Nîmes became the metropolis of Bas-Languedoc, diversifying its industry into new kinds of activity. At the same time the surrounding countryside adapted to market needs and shared in the general increase of wealth.

During the Second World War, Wehrmacht troops occupied Vichy France in November 1942. On 22 April 1943, Wehrmacht soldiers executed the Maquis resistance fighters Jean Robert and Vinicio Faïta at Nîmes.

On 27 May 1944, bombers of the USAAF bombed the Nîmes marshalling yards. It was one of the preparations for Operation Dragoon (landing operation in the Rhône delta) that started on 15 August 1944.

The 2e Régiment Étranger d'Infanterie (2ºREI), the main motorised infantry regiment of the French Foreign Legion, has been garrisoned in Nîmes since November 1983.

=== Archaeology ===
In April 2024, a collection of glassware dating back to the Roman period was discovered in Nîmes. The collection includes strigils, ornate glass vases, ceramics, a glass paste cup, lamps, fragments of funerary monuments, and amphorae.

== Geography ==
=== Climate ===
Nîmes is one of the warmest cities in France. The city has a humid subtropical climate (Köppen: Cfa), with summers being too wet for it to be classified as a hot-summer Mediterranean climate (Köppen: Csa). Its slightly inland, southerly location results in hot air over the city during summer months: temperatures above 34 °C are common in July and August, whereas winters are cool but not cold. Nighttime low temperatures below 0 °C are common from December to February, while snowfall occurs every year.

Climate data for Nîmes (Météo France Office Nîmes-Courbessac, altitude 59m, 1991–2020 normals, extremes 1922–present)
Month	Jan	Feb	Mar	Apr	May	Jun	Jul	Aug	Sep	Oct	Nov	Dec	Year
Record high °C (°F)	21.5 (70.7)	25.1 (77.2)	27.3 (81.1)	30.7 (87.3)	34.7 (94.5)	44.4 (111.9)	40.3 (104.5)	41.6 (106.9)	36.8 (98.2)	31.9 (89.4)	26.1 (79.0)	20.9 (69.6)	44.4 (111.9)
Mean maximum °C (°F)	17.9 (64.2)	19.2 (66.6)	23.4 (74.1)	26.3 (79.3)	30.2 (86.4)	34.8 (94.6)	36.4 (97.5)	36.8 (98.2)	32.0 (89.6)	26.7 (80.1)	21.2 (70.2)	17.7 (63.9)	37.8 (100.0)
Mean daily maximum °C (°F)	11.4 (52.5)	12.9 (55.2)	16.7 (62.1)	19.5 (67.1)	23.6 (74.5)	28.3 (82.9)	31.5 (88.7)	31.2 (88.2)	26.1 (79.0)	20.9 (69.6)	15.2 (59.4)	11.8 (53.2)	20.8 (69.4)
Daily mean °C (°F)	7.3 (45.1)	8.1 (46.6)	11.5 (52.7)	14.1 (57.4)	18.0 (64.4)	22.3 (72.1)	25.2 (77.4)	24.9 (76.8)	20.5 (68.9)	16.3 (61.3)	11.0 (51.8)	7.8 (46.0)	15.6 (60.1)
Mean daily minimum °C (°F)	3.2 (37.8)	3.3 (37.9)	6.2 (43.2)	8.7 (47.7)	12.4 (54.3)	16.3 (61.3)	18.9 (66.0)	18.6 (65.5)	14.9 (58.8)	11.6 (52.9)	6.9 (44.4)	3.8 (38.8)	10.4 (50.7)
Mean minimum °C (°F)	−2.7 (27.1)	−2.2 (28.0)	−0.1 (31.8)	3.1 (37.6)	7.2 (45.0)	11.4 (52.5)	14.4 (57.9)	14.1 (57.4)	9.5 (49.1)	5.0 (41.0)	−0.1 (31.8)	−2.5 (27.5)	−4.1 (24.6)
Record low °C (°F)	−12.2 (10.0)	−14.0 (6.8)	−6.8 (19.8)	−2.0 (28.4)	1.1 (34.0)	5.4 (41.7)	10.0 (50.0)	9.2 (48.6)	5.4 (41.7)	−1.0 (30.2)	−4.8 (23.4)	−9.7 (14.5)	−14.0 (6.8)
Average precipitation mm (inches)	64.1 (2.52)	40.1 (1.58)	44.7 (1.76)	67.1 (2.64)	55.1 (2.17)	43.0 (1.69)	30.2 (1.19)	44.4 (1.75)	100.3 (3.95)	95.0 (3.74)	97.1 (3.82)	53.3 (2.10)	734.4 (28.91)
Average precipitation days (≥ 1.0 mm)	5.8	4.9	5.0	6.8	6.0	4.4	3.0	3.6	5.2	6.4	7.9	5.7	64.8
Average snowy days	0.8	0.6	0.2	0.0	0.0	0.0	0.0	0.0	0.0	0.0	0.3	0.5	2.4
Average relative humidity (%)	71	68	63	63	64	61	56	60	67	73	72	72	65.8
Mean monthly sunshine hours	141.6	165.4	219.6	229.2	268.5	312.7	346.0	307.4	244.7	171.1	141.5	132.2	2,679.8
Percentage possible sunshine	51	51	56	57	59	68	77	74	64	55	50	49	59
Source 1: Météo France
Source 2: NOAA (percent sunshine 1961-1990), Infoclimat.fr (humidity 1961-1990)

Climate data for Nîmes (Garons, altitude 59m, 1991–2020 normals, extremes 1964–present)
Month	Jan	Feb	Mar	Apr	May	Jun	Jul	Aug	Sep	Oct	Nov	Dec	Year
Record high °C (°F)	20.5 (68.9)	23.8 (74.8)	26.9 (80.4)	29.6 (85.3)	35.1 (95.2)	44.1 (111.4)	40.1 (104.2)	39.9 (103.8)	35.3 (95.5)	31.3 (88.3)	26.3 (79.3)	20.3 (68.5)	44.1 (111.4)
Mean daily maximum °C (°F)	10.9 (51.6)	12.3 (54.1)	16.2 (61.2)	18.9 (66.0)	23.0 (73.4)	27.7 (81.9)	30.7 (87.3)	30.3 (86.5)	25.5 (77.9)	20.3 (68.5)	14.7 (58.5)	11.3 (52.3)	20.1 (68.2)
Daily mean °C (°F)	7.1 (44.8)	7.9 (46.2)	11.3 (52.3)	13.8 (56.8)	17.7 (63.9)	22.0 (71.6)	24.7 (76.5)	24.5 (76.1)	20.2 (68.4)	16.0 (60.8)	10.9 (51.6)	7.7 (45.9)	15.3 (59.5)
Mean daily minimum °C (°F)	3.4 (38.1)	3.5 (38.3)	6.3 (43.3)	8.8 (47.8)	12.5 (54.5)	16.3 (61.3)	18.8 (65.8)	18.6 (65.5)	15.0 (59.0)	11.7 (53.1)	7.1 (44.8)	4.0 (39.2)	10.5 (50.9)
Record low °C (°F)	−10.9 (12.4)	−8.4 (16.9)	−7.0 (19.4)	−0.7 (30.7)	3.3 (37.9)	6.6 (43.9)	10.8 (51.4)	10.3 (50.5)	6.1 (43.0)	1.9 (35.4)	−3.8 (25.2)	−7.3 (18.9)	−10.9 (12.4)
Average precipitation mm (inches)	58.3 (2.30)	36.8 (1.45)	44.7 (1.76)	64.5 (2.54)	48.3 (1.90)	35.4 (1.39)	23.7 (0.93)	34.8 (1.37)	101.9 (4.01)	92.0 (3.62)	93.4 (3.68)	50.8 (2.00)	684.6 (26.95)
Average precipitation days (≥ 1.0 mm)	5.7	4.9	4.6	6.2	5.8	3.9	2.8	3.5	5.1	6.3	7.2	5.5	61.3
Source: Météo-France

Comparison of local Meteorological data with other cities in France
Town	Sunshine (hours/yr)	Rain (mm/yr)	Snow (days/yr)	Storm (days/yr)	Fog (days/yr)
National average	1,973	770	14	22	40
Nîmes	2,664	761.3	2.4	23.6	10.6
Paris	1,661	637	12	18	10
Nice	2,724	767	1	29	1
Strasbourg	1,693	665	29	29	56
Brest	1,605	1,211	7	12	75

== Sights ==
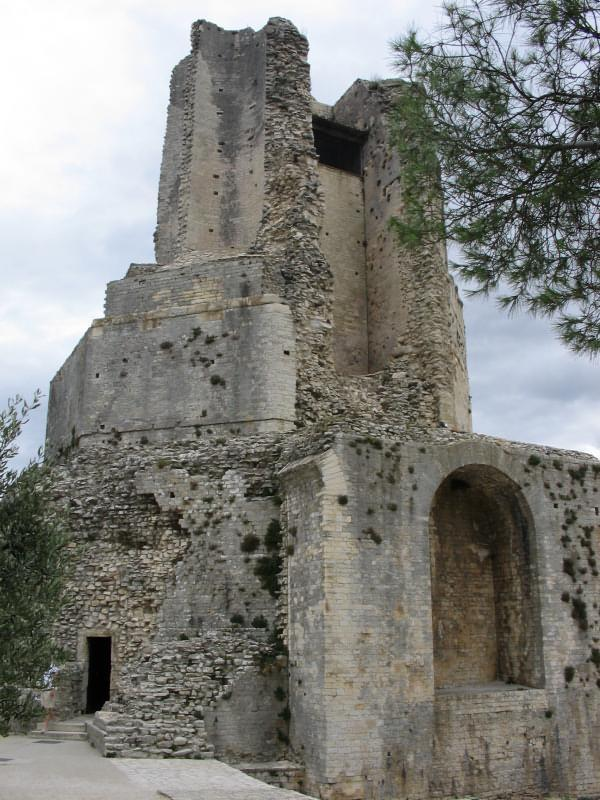
Tour Magne.

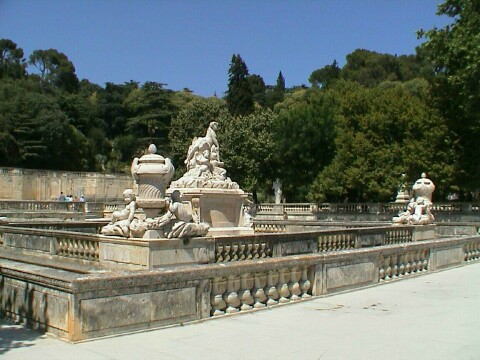
The Jardins de la Fontaine.

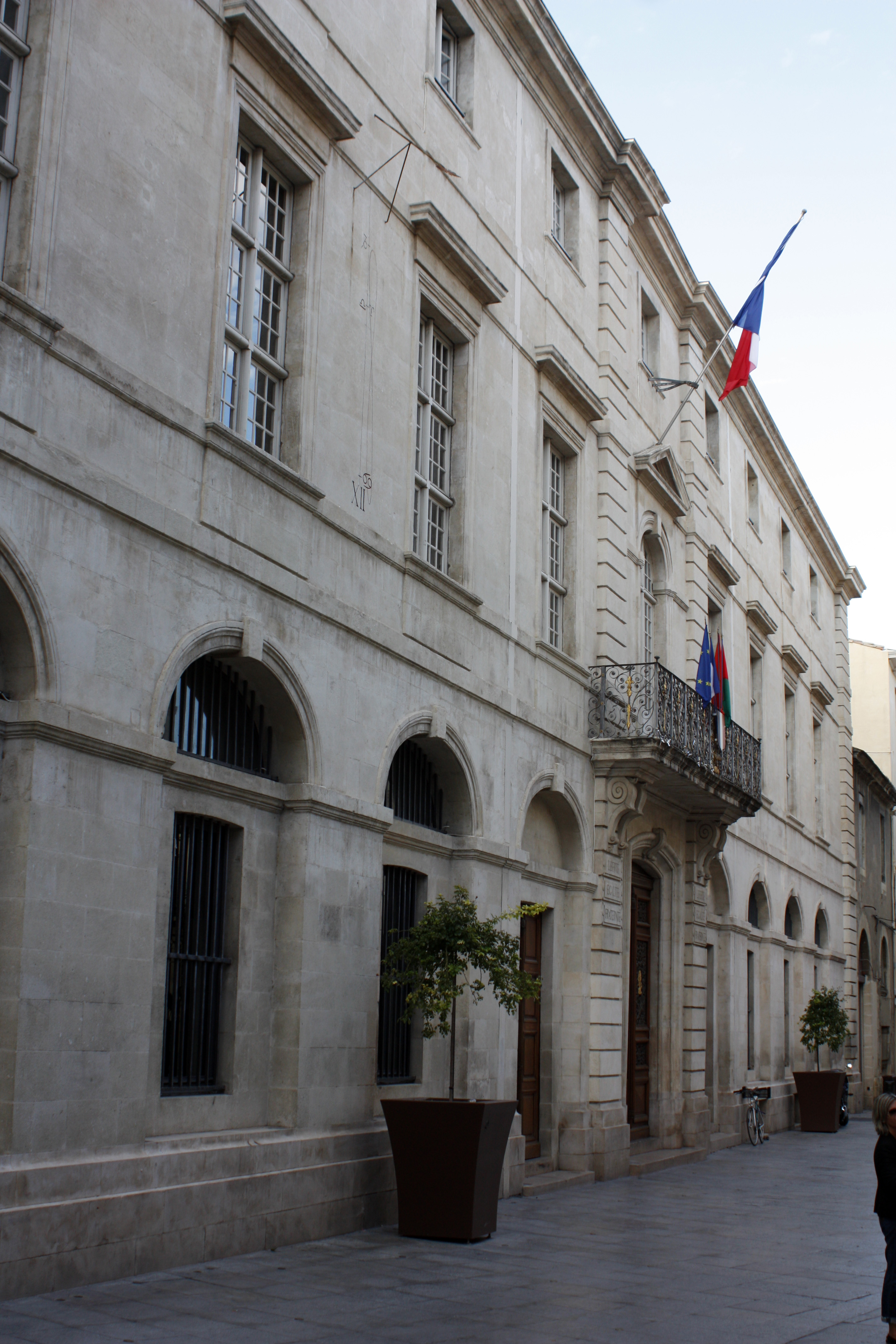
The Hôtel de Ville

Several important remains of the Roman Empire can still be seen in and around Nîmes:

- The elliptical Roman amphitheatre, of the 1st or 2nd century AD, is the best-preserved Roman arena in France. It was filled with medieval housing, when its walls served as ramparts, but they were cleared under Napoleon. It is still used as a bull fighting and concert arena.
- The Maison Carrée (Square House), a small Roman temple dedicated to sons of Agrippa was built c. 19 BCE. It is one of the best-preserved Roman temples anywhere. Visitors can watch a short film about the history of Nîmes inside.
- The 18th-century Jardins de la Fontaine (Gardens of the Fountain) built around the Roman thermae ruins.
- The nearby Pont du Gard, built by the Emperor Claudius, is a well-preserved aqueduct that used to carry water across the small Gardon river valley.
- The nearby Mont Cavalier is crowned by the Tour Magne ("Great Tower"), a ruined Roman tower.
- The castellum divisorium, a rare vestige of a Roman water inlet system.
- The Hôtel de Ville was completed in 1703.

Later monuments include:

- The cathedral (dedicated to Saint Castor of Apt, a native of the city), occupying, it is believed, the site of the temple of Augustus, is partly Romanesque and partly Gothic in style.
- The Musée des Beaux-Arts de Nîmes
- The Musée de la Romanité, a museum dedicated to Roman history, located outside the amphitheatre

Pieces of modern architecture can also be found: Norman Foster designed the Carré d'Art (1986), a modern art museum and multimedia library, and Jean Nouvel designed the Nemausus, a post-modern residential ensemble.

== Economy ==
Nîmes is historically known for its textiles. Denim, the fabric of blue jeans, derives its name from this city (Serge de Nîmes). The blue dye was imported via Genoa from Lahore, the capital of the Great Mughal.

== Population ==
The population of Nîmes in Roman times (50 AD) was estimated at 50–60,000, and it only reached that number again in the mid-19th century. The population of Nîmes increased from 128,471 in 1990 to 151,839 in 2023, yet the biggest growth the city ever experienced happened in 1968, with a growth of +23.5% compared to 1962.

Historical population

Year	Pop.	±% p.a.
1793	40,000	—
1800	39,594	−0.15%
1806	41,195	+0.66%
1821	37,908	−0.55%
1831	41,266	+0.85%
1836	43,036	+0.84%
1841	44,697	+0.76%
1846	53,497	+3.66%
1851	53,619	+0.05%
1856	54,293	+0.25%
1861	57,129	+1.02%
1866	60,151	+1.04%
1872	62,394	+0.61%
1876	63,001	+0.24%
1881	63,552	+0.17%
1886	69,898	+1.92%
1891	71,623	+0.49%
1896	74,601	+0.82%
1901	80,605	+1.56%

Year	Pop.	±% p.a.
1906	80,184	−0.10%
1911	80,437	+0.06%
1921	82,774	+0.29%
1926	84,667	+0.45%
1931	89,213	+1.05%
1936	93,758	+1.00%
1946	91,667	−0.23%
1954	89,130	−0.35%
1962	99,802	+1.42%
1968	123,292	+3.59%
1975	127,933	+0.53%
1982	124,220	−0.42%
1990	128,471	+0.42%
1999	133,424	+0.42%
2007	143,468	+0.91%
2012	146,709	+0.45%
2017	150,610	+0.53%
2023	151,839	+0.14%

Source: EHESS and INSEE (1968-2023)

== Culture ==
From 1810 to 1822, Joseph Gergonne published in Nîmes a scientific journal specializing in mathematics called Annales de Gergonne.

The asteroid 51 Nemausa was named after Nîmes, where it was discovered in 1858.

Twice each year, Nîmes hosts one of the main French bullfighting events, Feria de Nîmes (festival), and several hundreds of thousands gather in the streets.

In 2005, Rammstein filmed their #1 live Album Völkerball in Nîmes.

Metallica's live DVD Français Pour une Nuit (English: French for One Night) was recorded in Nîmes, France, in the Arena of Nîmes on 7 July 2009, during the World Magnetic Tour.

== Transportation ==
=== Air ===
Nîmes-Alès-Camargue-Cévennes Airport serves the city, although its proximity with the much bigger Montpellier Airport has worked against its frequentation over the years. It is currently only served by Ryanair with an average of 3 flights per day, to destinations such as London, Fez, Dublin or Marrakech.

=== Road ===
The motorway A9 connects Nîmes with Orange, Montpellier, Narbonne, and Perpignan, the A54 with Arles and Salon-de-Provence.

=== Rail ===
Nîmes station is the central railway station, offering connections to Paris (high-speed rail), Marseille, Montpellier, Narbonne, Toulouse, Perpignan, Figueres and Barcelona in Spain and several regional destinations. There is another station in the Saint-Césaire quarter, Saint-Césaire station, with connections to Le Grau-du-Roi, Montpellier and Avignon.

The new contournement Nîmes – Montpellier high-speed rail line opened to passenger service on 15 December 2019 together with a new TGV station at Nîmes-Pont-du-Gard station, located 12 km outside the city. The station is also located on the existing route between Nîmes and Avignon, thus providing connections between the new line and local rail service.

=== Bus ===
Nîmes bus station is adjacent to the city centre railway station. Buses connect the city with nearby towns and villages not served by rail.

== Sport ==
The association football club Nîmes Olympique, currently playing in Championnat National, is based in Nîmes.

World Archery Indoor World Cup takes place in Nîmes each year in mid January.

The local rugby union team is RC Nîmes.

The Olympic swimming champion Yannick Agnel was born in Nîmes.

The city hosted the opening stages of the 2017 Vuelta a España cycling race, and is often featured as a stage of the Tour de France.

== Mayors ==
- Émile Jourdan, PCF (1965–1983)
- Jean Bousquet, UDF (1983–1995)
- Alain Clary, PCF (1995–2001)
- Jean-Paul Fournier, LR (2001-2026)
- Vincent Bouget, PCF (2026-)

== Notable people ==
- Emmanuel Boileau de Castelnau (1857–1923), alpinist
- Janine Cayet (born 1943), MEP politician and advocate for disabled people
- Bernadette Lafont (1938–2013), actress
- Jean-César Vincens-Plauchut (1755–1801), politician

== Twin towns – sister cities ==
Nîmes is twinned with:

- Preston, United Kingdom, since 1955
- Verona, Italy, since 1960
- Braunschweig, Germany, since 1962
- Prague 1, Czech Republic, since 1967
- Frankfurt (Oder), Germany, since 1976
- Córdoba, Spain
- Rishon LeZion, Israel, since 1986
- Meknes, Morocco, since 2005
- Fort Worth, United States, since 2019

== See also ==
- Costières de Nîmes AOC
- Communes of the Gard department
- Councils of Nîmes
- Feria de Nîmes
