= Julio Aparicio Martínez =

Spanish bullfighter (born 1932)

Julio Aparicio
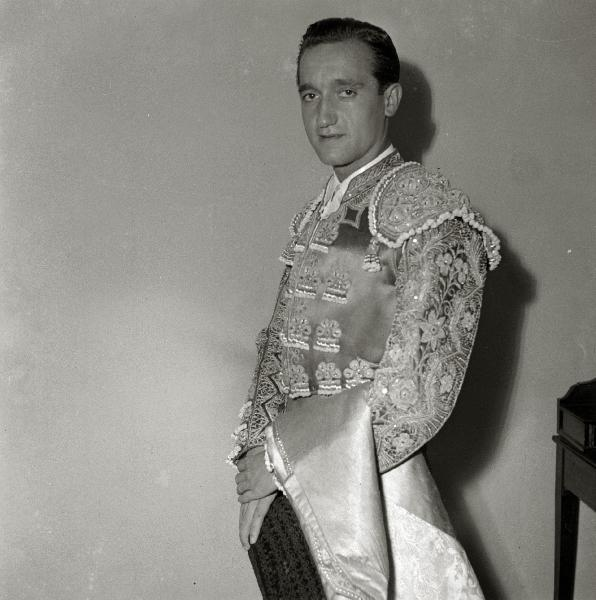
- Aparicio in his suit of lights

Personal information
- Nicknames: Maestro de La Fuente del Berro (not used in billing)
- Nationality: Spanish
- Born: Julio Aparicio Martínez; 13 February 1932 (age 94) Madrid, Spain
- Home town: Madrid
- Occupation: Bullfighter
- Years active: 1948–1962; 1965–1969
- Agent: Manolo Camará (apoderado)
- Spouse: Magdalena Díaz Loreto
- Children: Julio Aparicio Díaz; Magdalena "Kika" Aparicio Díaz; Pilar Aparicio Díaz
- Parent: Julio Aparicio Nieto (father)
- Other interests: Spanish Fighting Bull husbandry

Julio Aparicio Martínez (Spanish: [ˈxuljo apaˈɾiθjo maɾˈtineθ]; born 13 February 1932) is a retired Spanish bullfighter and cattleman.

== Biography ==
Aparicio was born on 13 February 1932 in the city of Madrid. His father, Julián Aparicio Nieto, was a novillero (novice bullfighter who fights bull calves) and a banderillero. In 1947, at the age of 15, he appeared at two bullfighting events without picadores. He made his début with horses (that is, with picadores) at Puertollano in the province of Ciudad Real (his father's birthplace) on 6 May 1948, cutting three ears from the calves that he had slain. He presented himself as a novillero at Las Ventas in Madrid on 19 June 1949, alternating with Luis Rivas and Pablo Lalanda. Five of the bull calves for the event came from the Don Antonio Pérez de San Fernando ranch, whereas the last was supplied by the Doña María Montalvo ranch.

Aparicio was borne shoulder-high out through the Great Gate at Las Ventas four times as a novillero, twice each in 1949 and 1950.

Aparicio took his alternativa, after three successful seasons as a novillero pairing up with Miguel Báez Espuny "El Litri" on 12 October 1950 at the Valencia bullring. Standing as "godfather" was Joaquín Rodríguez "Cagancho", while "El Litri" stood as witness. The bull for the ceremony was named Farruquero, from the Don Antonio Urquijo ranch, and that afternoon he reaped four ears and one tail. Also taking his alternativa on the same afternoon was "El Litri".

Aparicio's confirmation took place at Las Ventas in Madrid on 19 May 1951. Standing as "godfather" this time was Manuel González Cabello, while "El Litri" once again stood as witness, and the bull used for the ceremony was Cachifo, from the Moreno Urquijo ranch. He got great ovations for the bulls that he fought. He fought bulls 44 times at Las Ventas, and was borne shoulder-high out through the Great Gate seven times, in 1951, 1953, 1954 (twice), 1955, 1957, and 1962. On 1 October 1961, he fought bulls with great success before a crowd of 60,000 in Beirut, Lebanon, alternating with Juan Bienvenida and Juan García "Mondeño". The bulls were laid on by the Hidalgo Rincón y de Quesada ranch. In 1964, he was awarded the Cross of the Order of Beneficence for the great number of charitable bullfights in which he had participated.

Aparicio is one of Chinchón's (a town in the Community of Madrid) Favourite Sons. In Barcelona, he was once an idol, whereas in Seville, he did not enjoy the greatest of fandom. Until his retirement in 1969, he kept himself among the bullfighting stars, triumphing to great clamour on many occasions, such as those at Las Ventas in 1951 and 1952, Mexico in 1954, and Ronda in 1964 and 1969. These successes, however, were interspersed with serious gorings, like the ones that he sustained in Barcelona on 8 April 1956, in San Sebastián in 1960, in Morelia, Mexico in 1951, and in Arles, France on 10 September 1965.

By bullfighting season, Aparicio saw 19 novilladas (novice bullfights) in Spain in 1948, 72 in 1949, and 90 in 1950. After his alternativa that last year, when he became a fully-fledged matador, he saw 70 corridas in 1951, 49 in 1952, 34 in 1953, 35 in 1954, 40 in 1955, 37 in 1956, 43 in 1957, 43 in 1958, 33 in 1959, 29 in 1960, 32 in 1961, and 1 in 1964. He retired in 1962, only to make a comeback in 1965, but this only lasted four years.

== Retirement ==
On 24 August 1969, Aparicio retired for good from the bullrings at La Monumental in Barcelona, alternating with the Mexican bullfighter Antonio Lamelín and José Luis Segura. The Campocerrado ranch laid on the bulls that afternoon.

Aparicio, who retired without ever having been given a warning, was an efficient matador, as well as a great bullfighter, whose technique with the muleta was good; he was powerful, and had manners, temperament, and class. In the rivalry with El Litri, Aparicio came out on top in his treatment of the bull, and in the efficacy of his bullfighting, which was more rational and academic.

== Personal life ==
Aparicio wed the flamenco dancer Magdalena Díaz Loreto, better known as Malena Loreto, and their children are Julio, who is also a bullfighter, the actress Magdalena "Kika", and Pilar. Loreto died on 28 August 2011. He nowadays gives himself over to agriculture and raising fighting cattle on his farm, La Herrera, in the Province of Cáceres. The ranch was founded in 1958, and Aparicio inherited it.
