= Julio Robles =

Spanish bullfighter (1951–2001)

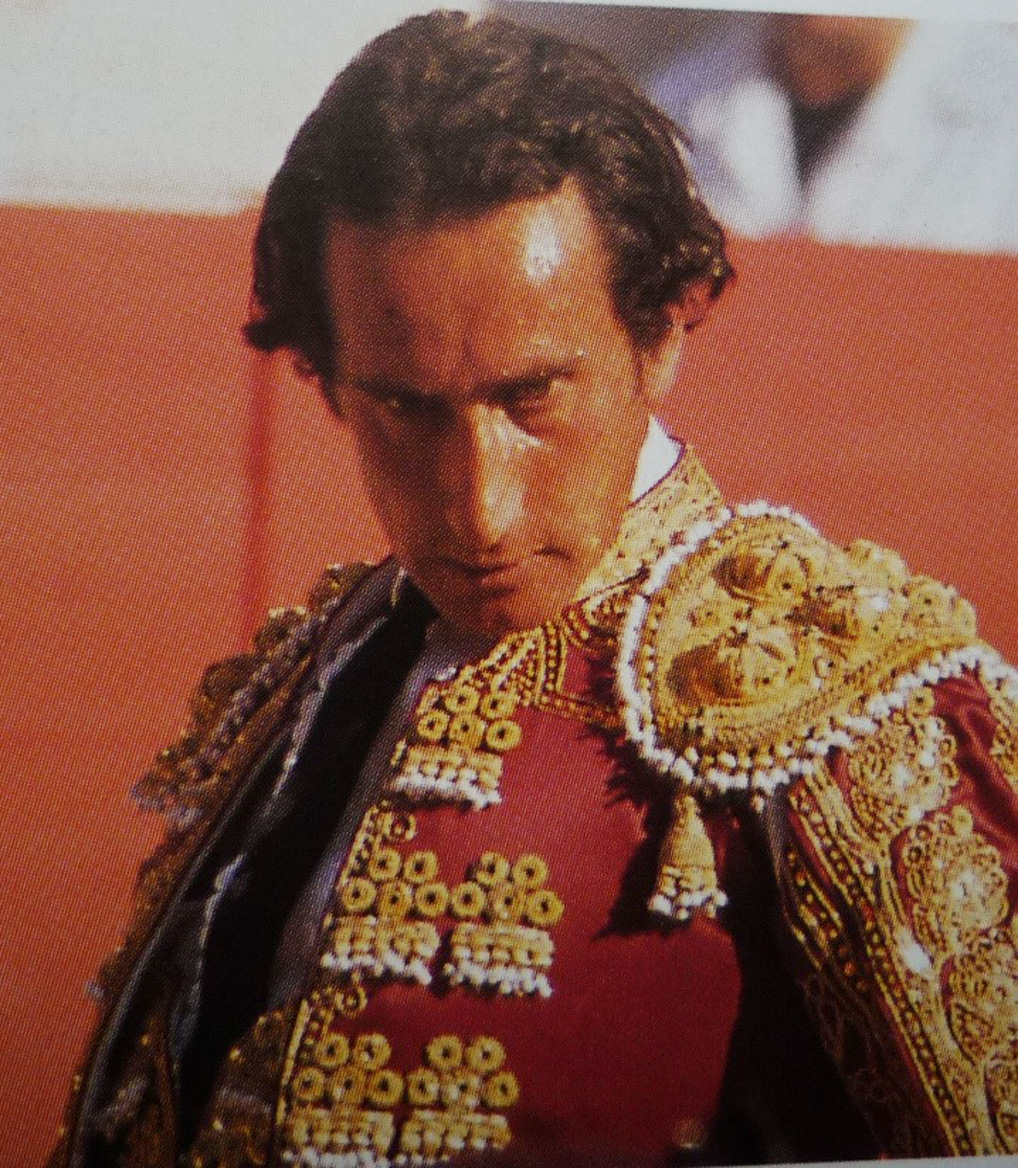
- Robles

Personal information
- Nicknames: El Salmantino (dropped early on)
- Nationality: Spanish
- Born: Avelino Julio Robles Hernández; 4 December 1951 Fontiveros, Ávila, Spain
- Died: 14 January 2001 (aged 49) Salamanca, Spain
- Resting place: Ahigal de los Aceiteros; 40°52′33″N 6°44′51″W
- Monument: Statue at Plaza de Toros La Glorieta
- Home town: La Fuente de San Esteban, Salamanca, Spain
- Occupation(s): Bullfighter; Rancher
- Years active: 1968–1990 (as bullfighter); 1997–2001 (as rancher)
- Agent: Victoriano Valencia (apoderado)
- Spouse: Liliana María Mejías (div. 1993)
- Relative(s): Florindo (brother); Isi (sister)
- Other interests: Bull ranching Hunting

Avelino Julio Robles Hernández (Spanish: [aβeˈlino ˈxuljo ˈroβles eɾˈnandeθ]; 4 December 1951 – 14 January 2001), usually known as Julio Robles, was a Spanish bullfighter whose career in Spain's bullrings was cut short by a life-altering injury during a bullfight. He went on to become a bull breeder for the last few years of his life, maintaining a link to his foremost passion even after losing most of his motor functions.

== Early life ==
Although Robles was born in Fontiveros, Ávila, at the young age of five, he moved with his father, who was a court secretary, to La Fuente de San Esteban, Salamanca, and always thought if himself as Salamancan. His new home was in a rural district and there were a great many ganaderías, or bull ranches, nearby. There, his enthusiasm for the fighting bulls grew. In his adolescence, he would sneak into the town's slaughterhouses to "fight" the calves that were to be slaughtered. He also went to the various bullfights that were held on bull ranches in the area, many times on his bicycle, earning a grounding in bullfighting as he went.

== Bullfighting career ==
Robles first donned the suit of lights on 28 August 1968 for a bullfighting event in Villavieja de Yeltes, Salamanca. In those days, he would announce himself as "El Salmantino" ("The Man from Salamanca").

In 1970, Robles made his début with picadores in Lleida, alternating with Paco Núñez and Avelino de la Fuente, and with bulls supplied by the María Lourdes Martín Pérez Tabernero ranch. On 11 June 1972, he presented himself in Madrid, alternating with Angelete and his inseparable companion Niño de la Capea. By this time, Robles already held a commanding place in the lower escalafón (bullfighters' rankings). He appeared again in a mano a mano (a bullfighting event at which there are only two bullfighters on the bill rather than the usual three) with Capea. On 9 July 1972, he took his alternativa at La Monumental in Barcelona. Standing as "godfather" at the ceremony was Diego Puerta, while Paco Camino stood as witness. His alternativa was confirmed on 22 May 1973 at Las Ventas in Madrid. Standing as "godfather" this time was Antonio Bienvenida, while Palomo Linares bore witness. The bull was Pernote, supplied by the Caridad Cobaleda ranch.

Early on in his bullfighting career, on 19 September 1972, Robles sustained a goring in Valladolid, and no sooner had he recovered from that than he got another one in Valencia. In Robles's own opinion, this might have slowed his career down. After a period of few contracts, from 1978 onwards things began to get better for Robles. He attributed his turnaround to an encounter with a bull from the Lázaro Soria ranch in this year. He became a regular bullfighter at the main fairs, always supported by Madrid fans, who always recognized the great quality of his bullfighting. He was borne out through the Great Gate at Las Ventas three times: on 12 July 1983, alternating with Antoñete and José Mari Manzanares when he "immortalized" a sobrero (reserve bull) named Cigarro from the Puerto de San Lorenzo ranch after performing a fine faena (series of passes before the bullfighter slays the bull); on 7 June 1985 alternating with Curro Romero and Pepe Luis Vázquez with bulls from the Torrealta ranch; and the 1989 Autumn Fair with bulls from the Buendía ranch. On many other occasions he gave ample evidence of his excellent verónica (bullfighting move in which the cape is drawn over the bull's face) and the depth of his muleta work. He did not reach the privileged position of a bullfighting icon, although his name was always well regarded by the fans who knew how to savour his masterful bullfighting.

As successful as Robles sometimes was at Las Ventas, he was rather less so at Spain's other great bullfighting centre, the Maestranza in Seville, but even so, at the 1989 Seville Fair, his triumph drew a great clamour from the crowd, and even though the corrida presidency withheld the honour of letting him be borne shoulder-high out through the Prince's Gate, he was awarded two ears for his performance.

It was also in 1989 that Robles performed a rather dangerous faena in Pamplona at which he had his feet in the muck during a torrential downpour.

== Injury and later years ==
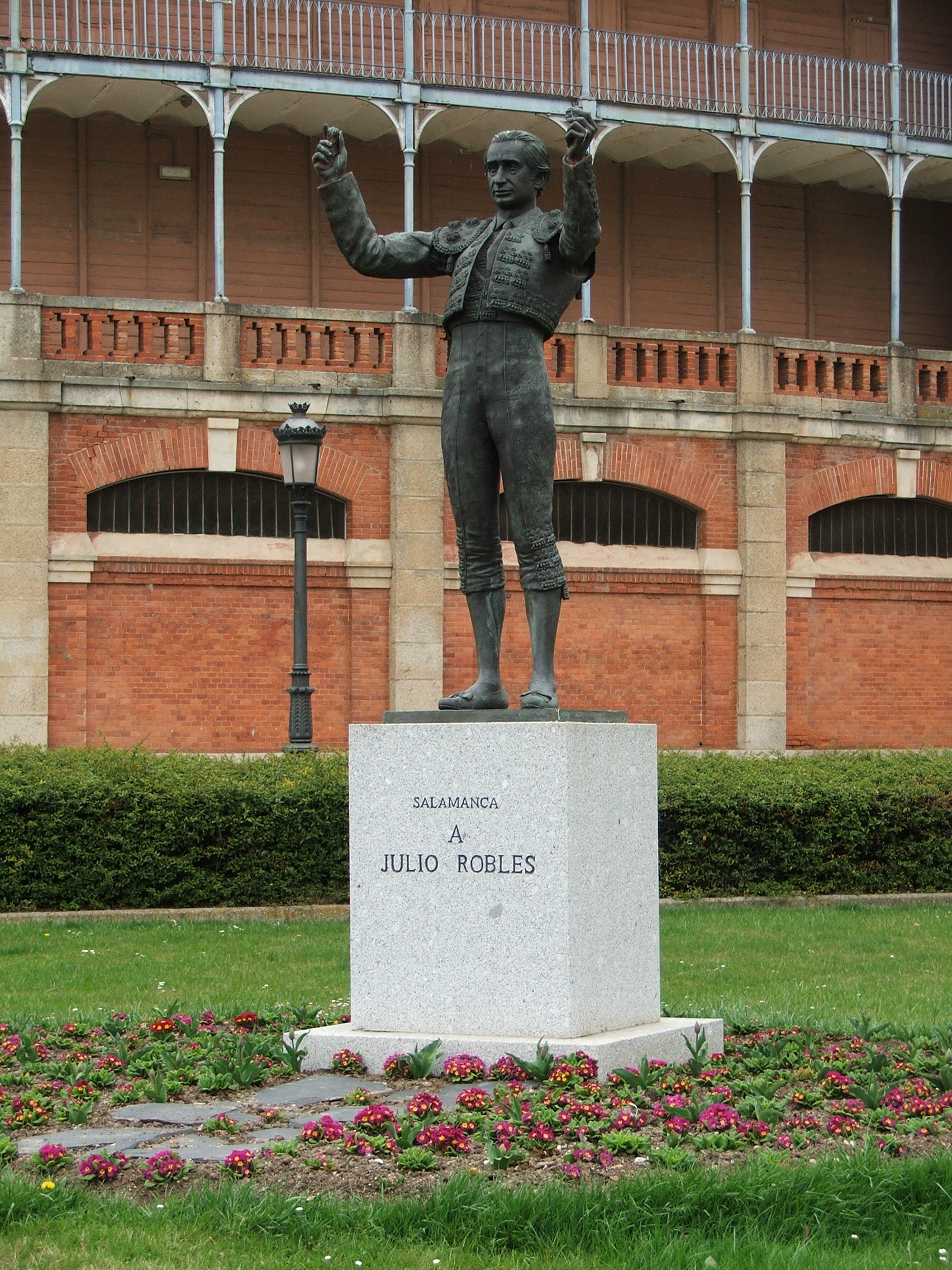
Statue in Julio Robles's honour outside the Salamanca bullring.

On 13 August 1990, Robles's career as a bullfighter came to an abrupt end when he was seriously injured by a bull named Timador, from the Cayetano Muñoz ranch, at the Béziers bullring in the south of France. Timador twice threw the bullfighter over while the latter was performing a verónica, causing damage to his neck vertebrae that was bad enough to leave Robles tetraplegic. A year earlier, at the Arles bullring, also in the south of France, Nimeño II had sustained a similar injury, although that was more severe. Nevertheless, the gravity of Robles's injury became quite apparent after he was quickly taken to the bullring's infirmary, and he was then transferred by helicopter to a hospital in Montpellier (about 60 km away from Béziers) — indeed, the very same hospital where Nimeño II had undergone surgery after his injury. Although Robles had not actually broken his neck, the lesions between his fifth and sixth cervical vertebrae nonetheless left him severely disabled for the rest of his life.

Robles's medical condition, which left him with some limited movement, led to marital breakdown, and his Colombian wife, Liliana María Mejías, left her husband of twelve years in 1993 and returned to her country after experiencing what she described as three years of immense pain and suffering. In 1997, Robles founded the ganadería (bull ranch) La Glorieta. He would spend most of the rest of his life there.

Even after he had become tetraplegic, Robles still managed to pursue his other great joy, which was hunting. He needed a board to keep his left arm straight so that he could hold the rifle. He could then pull the trigger with his right thumb — the finger in which he had the best movement. He managed to kill two deer this way. His apoderado (manager/agent) Victoriano Valencia's son-in-law Enrique Ponce even helped Robles do a bit of bullfighting, from his wheelchair. Robles also kept up on events in the bullfighting world, and was impressed with many of the younger bullfighters. He still sometimes also travelled. Bullfighting clubs in both Paris and London invited him to visit, and despite his limited mobility, he accepted these invitations and was especially impressed by London, saying later that it was a "stupendous trip to that city that was so fascinating". At the time when he gave his last interview – only fifteen days before his then unexpected death – he was getting ready for several hunting trips to South Africa. By this time, he had already learnt to drive again, using a modified car.

Robles died on 14 January 2001 at the Clínica Santísima Trinidad de Salamanca in Salamanca at the age of 49, of cardiac arrest, after coming down with peritonitis due to a perforated colon. A year later, the mayor of Salamanca, Julián Lanzarote, unveiled a statue outside the Salamanca bullring as a homage to the bullfighter. The sculptor was Salvador Amaya. Robles was considered a bullfighter of classical style, depth, quality, purity and artistry.

Robles's loyal apoderado Victoriano Valencia donated another sculptural monument to the town of Ahigal de los Aceiteros, where Robles's surviving family members now live. The sculptor was Luis Sanguino. It depicts Robles in his suit of lights, fighting a bull.

== Desecration of Robles's grave ==
In September 2008, members of the Iniciativa Charra Contra la Desaparición del Tauricidio ("Salamancan Initiative Against [sic] the Disappearance of Tauricide"; another report renders this name a bit less contradictorily Iniciativa Charra Contra el Tauricidio, or "Salamancan Initiative Against Tauricide") claimed responsibility for having profaned the bullfighter's grave, which lies at the cemetery in Ahigal de los Aceiteros, Salamanca, meaning to steal his body (which they found "impossible"), and furthermore carry out several acts of vandalism, which mainly involved painting graffiti critical of bullfighters and bullfighting. This included such slogans as "Toreros asesinos" ("Bullfighters murderers"). They also stole the bust of Robles, weighing 20 kg, and stated that they would not return it until "the massacre of fighting bulls ends". Eleven members were arrested and detained in 2011 in places all over Spain, and accused in this and many other violent acts. By this time, they were being identified as members of the Spanish arm of the Animal Liberation Front, a "radical ecological group".
