= El Viti =

Spanish bullfighter (born 1938)

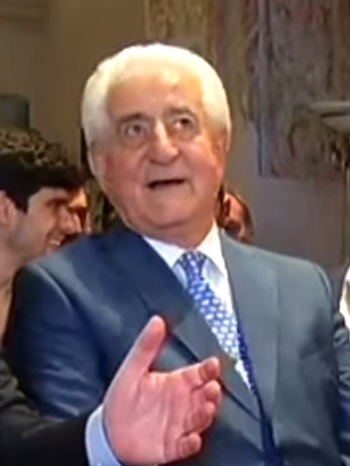
- El Viti in 2015

Personal information
- Full name: Santiago Martín Sánchez
- Nicknames: El Viti; Su Majestad
- Nationality: Spanish
- Born: 18 July 1938 (age 87) Vitigudino, Salamanca, Spain
- Monuments: Sculptures at Salamanca and Vitigudino, latter in square bearing his name
- Home town: Salamanca, Spain
- Occupation: Bullfighter
- Years active: 1956–1979
- Agent: Florentino Díaz Martín (1959–1975); Pedro Balañá (1976–) (apoderados)
- Spouse: Mari Carmen García Cobaleda (m. 1968; died 2022)
- Children: Guadalupe Martín García; Marisa Martín García; Francisco Martín García (Note: The surnames are inferred from their parents' paternal surnames.)
- Parents: Baltasar Martín (father); Filomena Sánchez (Note: The paternal surnames are inferred from their son's two surnames.) (mother)
- Relatives: Bernardino García Fonseca (father-in-law); Eusebia Cobaleda Galache (mother-in-law)
- Other interests: Livestock raising (mainly Spanish Fighting Bulls)

Santiago Martín Sánchez (Spanish: [sanˈtjaɣo maɾˈtin ˈsantʃeθ]; born 18 July 1938), known as El Viti (Spanish: [el ˈβiti]), is a retired Spanish bullfighter. He holds the record for the greatest number of times that any bullfighter has been borne on shoulders out through the Great Gate at the Las Ventas bullring in Madrid (the greatest honour in the bullfighting world), namely fourteen as a matador, and two others while he was still a novillero.

== Biography ==
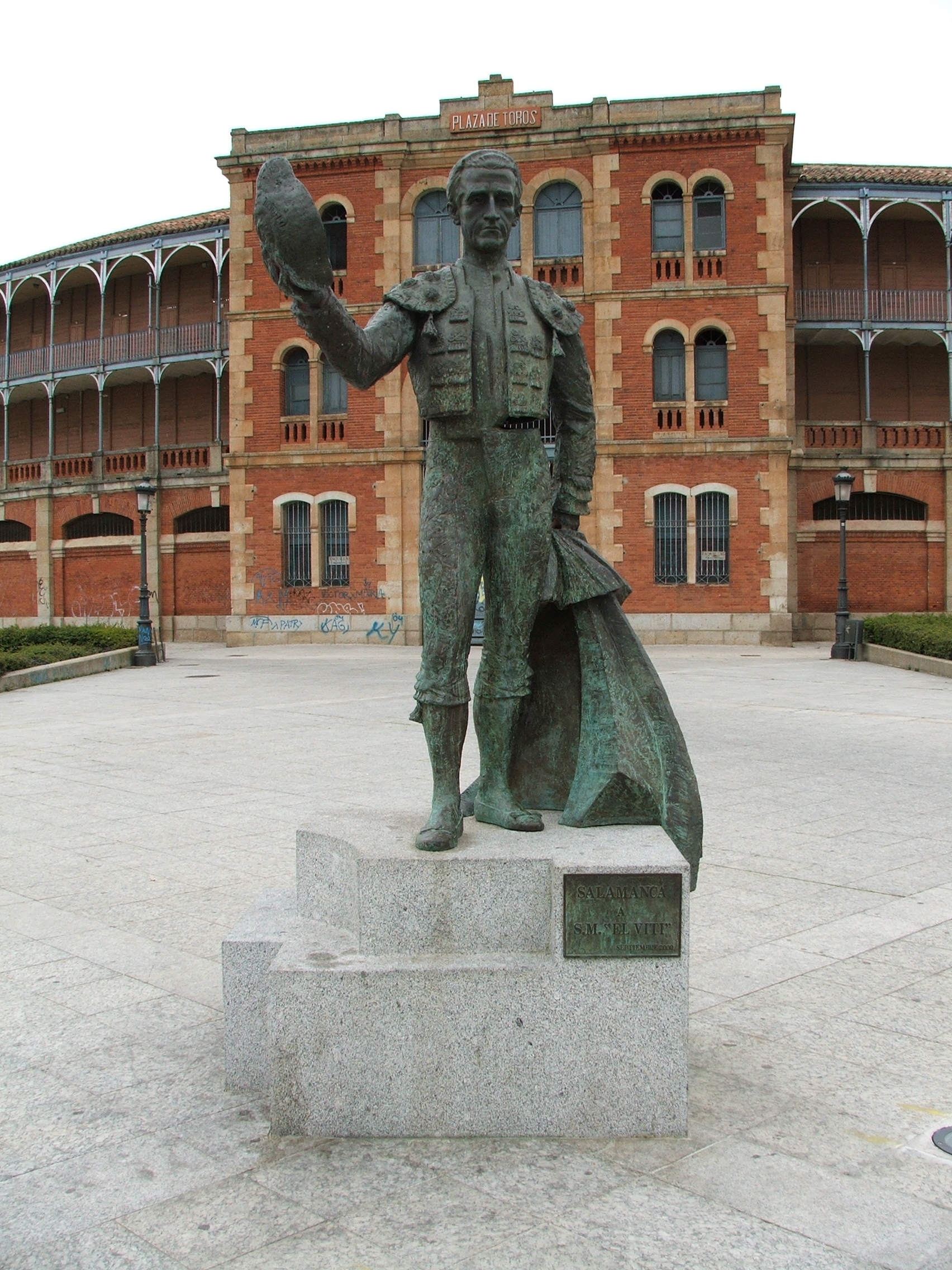
Statue of El Viti standing before the gateway into La Glorieta (the Salamanca bullring), put up in September 2000.

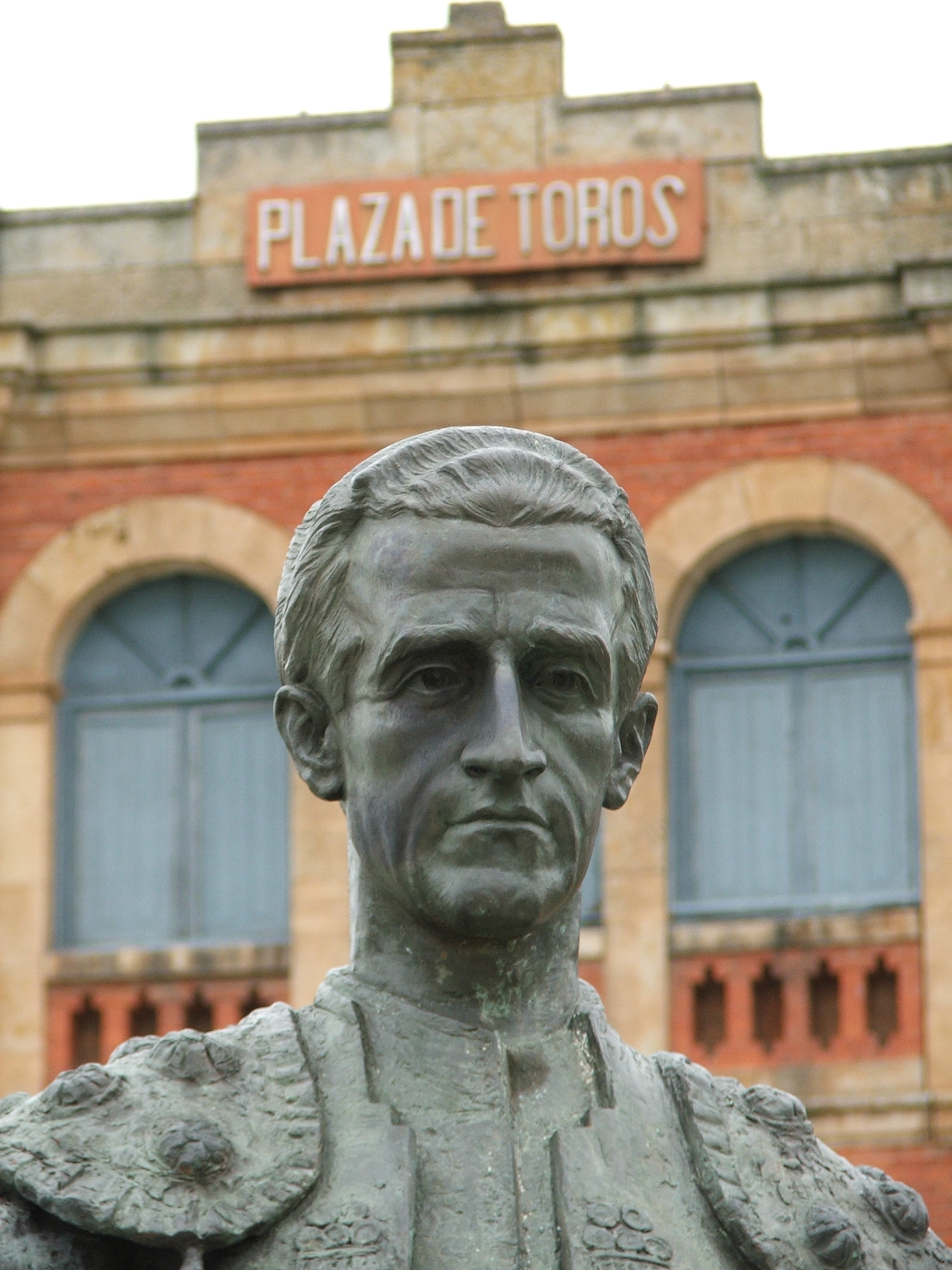
Detail of the statue

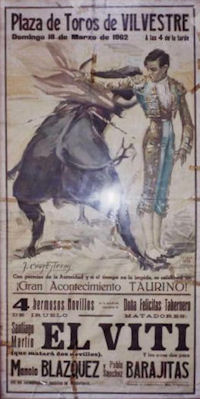
Bullfight poster for El Viti's engagement in Vilvestre.

=== Early life ===
Santiago Martín Sánchez was born on 18 July 1938 in the village of Vitigudino in the Province of Salamanca. He was thus born into the Spanish Civil War and would spend his whole life until the age of 37 living under Francisco Franco's military dictatorship. He grew up in a simple, rural family. His father ran a workshop for farm carts.

His nickname, El Viti, derives from his boyhood town's name, Vitigudino. The nickname was bestowed upon him by the local schoolteacher Don Manuel Moreno Blanco.

El Viti's family had no background in bullfighting whatsoever. Nonetheless, El Viti has been the first great bullfighter to be raised in Salamanca, at the height of the livestock-raising boom in that province.

He travelled back and forth across the Salamancan countryside as a youngster to attend capeas (rural, somewhat less than professional-level bullfights), and he first donned the suit of lights in August 1956, at the bullring in Ledesma. Another source says that he first stood before a bovine adversary at Vitigudino on the occasion of the Feast of Corpus Christi in 1955 (and therefore on or about 9 June that year), although nothing is said about him wearing a suit of lights that day.

=== Beginnings as a novillero ===
El Viti had his début with picadores in May 1957 at Ledesma, alternating with "Ávila" and the Mexican Roberto Ocampo. Yearling bulls were laid on by the Zumer Brothers' ranch. He became known as a novillero (novice bullfighter who fights yearling bulls) at the old Vistalegre bullring in Madrid's Carabanchel district in 1959.

At a 1959 engagement at Madrid's old Vistalegre bullring, El Viti reaped one ear from each of the yearlings that he fought. It was one of nine novilladas (novice bullfights) at which he appeared that season, five of which were held at Vistalegre.

On 18 July 1960 came El Viti's presentation at Las Ventas. The young bulls were furnished by Juan José Ramos and Brothers, and he was alternating with Tomás Sánchez Jiménez and Antonio de Jesús. The result of his performance on this afternoon was the first of a record number of triumphant rides on shoulders out through the bullring's Great Gate. Because he had performed so well, he was held over for the next five afternoons.

The 1960 bullfighting season brought 35 novilladas El Viti's way, but not all ended in triumph: he was wounded by yearling bulls twice that year, once in Alicante and another time in San Sebastián.

While El Viti was still a novillero, a yearling knocked him over at the bullring in Fréjus, France in 1958, leaving him with a broken left arm. This injury left him with a slight but permanent defect that prevented him from fully stretching his arm out, but instead of hindering his art, it gave him a unique and inimitable style in his natural bullfighting (that is, when the bull is released on the same side as the hand that holds the muleta):

This little defect made El Viti's natural bullfighting sensational, because he had to offset the lack of elbow extension with wrist movement. Thus, the bull always went inside and never moved too far. El Viti was a brave man, because to do bullfighting so slowly without taking advantage of the touches and wrist movements with one arm in the virulé style, you have to be a hero.
—Domingo Delgado de la Cámara, Revisión del toreo (2002)

=== Career as a matador ===
El Viti took his alternativa in Madrid on 13 May 1961, during the Feria de San Isidro ("Saint Isidore's Fair" — a yearly event at Las Ventas), with Toledo's Gregorio Sánchez standing as "godfather", while Diego Puerta bore witness. The bulls were laid on by the Alipio Pérez-Tabernero ranch. The actual bull used for the ceremony was named Guapito ("Little Handsome One"). That afternoon, he cut an ear from each of two bulls, and he also rode out through the Great Gate on shoulders together with the day's other two bullfighters. El Viti himself was borne shoulder-high all the way to his hotel.

On 30 December 1962, he presented himself at the Plaza México in Mexico City, where his alternativa was confirmed. Standing as "godfather" this time was Jorge "Ranchero" Aguilar, while Antonio del Olivar bore witness. The bull used for the ceremony was Voluntario (ironically "Volunteer") from the La Punta ranch.

El Viti appeared at 61 bullfighting engagements in the 1962 season, but he did not get through them all unscathed, sustaining two serious gorings, one in Palma de Mallorca and the other in Barcelona.

The date 18 March 1962 was special for the residents of Vilvestre, a little town in El Viti's part of the country, for El Viti made a triumphant return to the town to star in an historic corrida that all the townsfolk would remember. A poster advertising the event can be seen at right.

In 1963, El Viti fought at 73 engagements, and the next year, at 77. Although a bullfight in Pamplona on 10 July 1964 ended in great triumph and he was awarded the bull's tail, he rejected it, along with Diego Puerta and Paco Camino. In 1964, he topped the escalafón taurino (bullfighters' rankings). In 1965, he was awarded the Oreja de Oro ("Golden Ear") at the Plaza México for his performance on 4 March, with a brave faena (series of passes before the bullfighter slays the bull) with the bull Limoncito ("Little Lemon") from the Las Huertas ranch. Also on the bill that day were Alfredo Leal, Antonio del Olivar, Madrid's Victoriano Valencia, Manuel Benítez "El Cordobés", and Gabino Aguilar. Later the same year, he was once again badly wounded in Palma de Mallorca. In 1966, he found himself at 68 bullfighting engagements, but at one of them, held in Bogotá, he suffered yet another serious goring. He saw 64 engagements the following year, but the woundings kept on coming; there were three, in Barcelona and Málaga in his homeland, and at the Plaza de toros de Acho in Lima over in Peru.

Remembered particularly well is a faena at the Vistalegre bullring on 19 May 1968, in which he alternated with Gregorio Sánchez and Ángel Teruel as they fought bulls from the Lisardo Sánchez ranch. It was a total success, after which El Viti cut a bull's tail off and the fans took him up onto their shoulders and bore him for several kilometres to the Bridge of Toledo.

He was also a favourite bullfighter among the demanding public at the plaza de toros de la Real Maestranza de Caballería de Sevilla, even though he was not Andalusian. Greatly influenced as he was by Juan Belmonte's aesthetic, he for years represented the seriousness and neoclassical tradition in tauromachy, being considered by critics to be one of history's best-skilled bullfighters with the muleta.

Furthermore, he was acclaimed for the faena at the Plaza México on 4 January 1970 with the bull Aventurero ("Adventurer"), from the Tequisquiapan ranch (Alfredo Leal reaped two ears — but also a serious goring; Solórzano hijo rounded out the bill).

On 12 December 1975 at the Santamaría Bullring in Bogotá, he was the star in an unprecedented feat that has never been repeated. Each of the three bullfighters on the bill that afternoon, not only El Viti but Palomo Linares and Enrique Calvo "El Cali" too – one after the other – granted a bull from the Vistahermosa ranch an indulto (a "pardon"), thus sparing the three beasts the sword and sending them not only back to the bullpens, but also back to the Vistahermosa ranch.

On 17 April 1969 at the Maestranza in Seville, El Viti had a triumphant afternoon alternating with Palomo Linares and Ángel Teruel as they fought and slew bulls from the Lisardo Sánchez ranch. He reaped two ears.

El Viti was well known at Las Ventas, a notable bullring, at which he had opened the Great Gate the most times. He was borne on shoulders out through the gate fourteen times as a matador and twice as a novillero, thus sixteen times in all, and twice each in the years 1960 (as a novillero), 1965, 1966, 1969, and 1970. In total, he cut 40 ears as a matador at Madrid's great bullring.

=== Being borne out through the Great Gate at Las Ventas ===
El Viti's sixteen trips out through the Great Gate at Las Ventas – two as a novillero and fourteen as a fully fledged matador – were on these dates; details of each bullfight's outcome are included:

- 18 July 1960, at his maiden appearance at Las Ventas (as a novillero).
- Another in 1960 for which precise data are unavailable (as a novillero).
- 13 May 1961, after being awarded one ear from each of his two bulls that afternoon, both from the Alipio Pérez-Tabernero Sanchón (the day's first) and Escudero Calvo (the day's sixth) ranches; this was his first time through the Great Gate after his alternativa — and indeed, it came on the very day of his alternativa.
- 22 May 1962, after receiving an ovation and being awarded both one bull's ears; the bulls were supplied by the Doña María Teresa Oliveira ranch.
- 27 May 1964, after receiving an ovation and being awarded both one bull's ears; the bulls were supplied by the Francisco Galache de Hernandinos ranch.
- 17 May 1965, after being awarded one ear from one bull, and both another's; the bulls were supplied by the Francisco Galache de Hernandinos ranch.
- 25 May 1965, after being awarded one lap round the ring and both one bull's ears; the bulls were supplied by the Eduardo Miura Fernández ranch.
- 21 May 1966, after being awarded both one bull's ears and receiving an ovation; the bulls were supplied by the Alipio Pérez-Tabernero Sanchón ranch.
- 25 May 1966, after being awarded both one bull's ears and receiving applause; the bulls were supplied by the Don Manuel Francisco Garzón ranch.
- 20 May 1967, after being awarded one ear from one bull, and both another's; the bulls were supplied by the Francisco Galache de Hernandinos ranch.
- 16 May 1969, after being awarded one ear from one bull, and both another's; the bulls were supplied by the Don Baltasar Ibán Valdés ranch.
- 17 May 1969, after being awarded both one bull's ears; the bulls were supplied by the Francisco Galache de Hernandinos ranch.
- 20 May 1970, after being awarded both one bull's ears and one from another; the bulls were supplied by the Don Juan Mari Pérez-Tabernero Montalvo ranch.
- 22 May 1970, after being awarded both one bull's ears; the bulls were supplied by the Don Baltasar Ibán Valdés ranch.
- 17 May 1971, after being awarded both one bull's ears; the bulls were supplied by the Don Anastasio Fernándo Iglesias ranch.
- 7 June 1973, after being awarded one ear from each of two bulls supplied by the Don Manuel Arranz ranch.

El Viti's number of rides on shoulders out through the Great Gate as a matador is 14, as against Paco Camino's 12 and Antonio Bienvenida's 11. He is also one of only two bullfighters to have crossed the Great Gate's threshold on two consecutive days (the other being the Colombian César Rincón).

=== Later life ===
The 1979 bullfighting season was El Viti's last. He saw great success at the Maestranza in Seville on the afternoon of 24 April, before Curro Romero and Tomás Campuzano (who was taking his alternativa), and was awarded the Maestranza Trophy for the fair's best muleta work. His penultimate appearance took place on 14 September on home ground, in Salamanca, sharing the billing with Niño de la Capea and Julio Robles as all three fought bulls from the Atanasio Fernández ranch. He cut two ears. He retired from the bullrings in Valladolid, at the end of the bullfighting season on 16 September 1979. It all ended rather sadly; he was not successful, and he even got abuse from the crowd on his last bull. El Viti had fought in more than 800 corridas. For some years he worked as a livestock farmer, raising Spanish Fighting Bulls, the very beasts that he had faced in bullrings across Spain, France and Latin America.

A statue in El Viti's honour stands in Salamanca on the bullring's esplanade. It is a bronze, life-size figure standing on a granite pedestal and holding a muleta with the left hand, hanging down and behind the figure somewhat, and holding a montera up with the right hand. The whole is 2.30 m tall. The sculptor who created it was Narcisa Vicente Rodríguez, from Salamanca, and her work was unveiled on 8 September 2000. The plaque – also bronze – simply reads "SALAMANCA A S.M. 'EL VITI' SEPTIEMBRE 2000" ("a" simply means "to").

Another statue in El Viti's honour stands at a square bearing his name in the little town where he was born, Vitigudino. It was unveiled by El Viti himself on 18 June 2011.

On 1 July 2022, El Viti's wife, Mari Carmen García Cobaleda, whom he had wed on 28 November 1968, died after a long illness. She was a bull-rancher's daughter from Castraz, and was El Viti's inseparable companion.

== Style ==
El Viti has been called the "standard of the Castilian school" and "one of history's most elegant bullfighters".

Some people, (like writer Gonzalo I. Bienvenida) consider this bullfighter to be a prime example of the "Castilian school" of bullfighting, as well as pure bullfighting elegance. Others (like people from Alba de Tormes), believe he actually belongs to the "Salamanca school," characterized by the sobriety and good craftsmanship "

Much of El Viti's style of bullfighting – and perhaps even his great success at the pursuit – may be explained by his own thoughts on bullfighting. In a letter entitled Torear es amar ("Bullfighting is Loving"), which he wrote for Felipe Garrigues's book Sonajero, published in 1998, he said, among other things:

"For me, the bull has been a companion. The best collaborator at all levels, because he is the one that has given me the opportunity to love my friends, my colleagues, to respect other bullfighters. Hence the zenith of the relationship, of consideration, of respect... I have never dreamt of bullfighters, I have dreamt of bulls..., what I had to do with the bulls..., the way to fight them. He has been the one who has inspired all my passions, all my affections, thanks to him I have been a man in all my aspects, physical and mental. The bull has always been a friend, never a foe."

== On himself ==
El Viti is a very humble man when it comes to analysing the reasons for his successes as a bullfighter. In the Bienvenida Hall at Las Ventas, on the occasion of an event dedicated to him on 30 May 2019, he offered the following reflections:

"My whole career can be summed up in one word: coincidence. (Note: The word that he used in Spanish was casualidad, which might also be translated "chance", "happenstance", "fluke", or "accident".) I still cannot believe everything that has happened to me, coming out into the world from a small town like Vitigudino. Honestly, I can only say that I have admired and learnt from all those that I have seen in bullfights, as I continue to learn from those of today. In reality, I do not think that I have been more than anyone else, but rather that all bullfighters are continuers of the great history of bullfighting and that we are lucky to be able to carry out a beautiful and exciting profession. That is why I thank God for everything that has happened to me, both the hardest and the humblest successes that I have been able to achieve."

== In popular culture ==
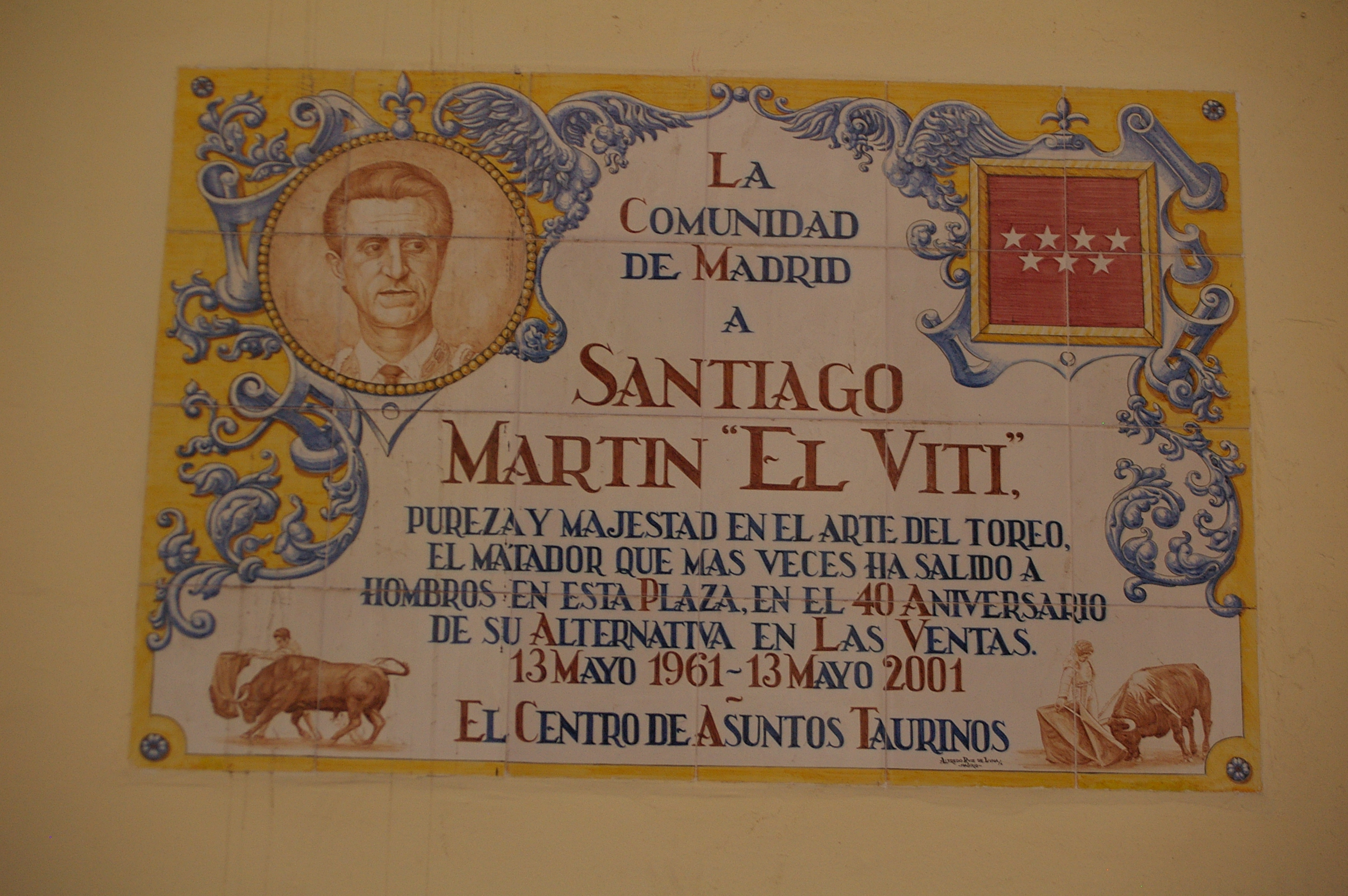
Plaque commemorating the 40th anniversary of El Viti's début at Las Ventas.

Francisco Almagro wrote the lyrics to S.M. El Viti; pasodoble torero, (Note: "S.M." stands for Su Majestad — "His Majesty" — and it is a play on his actual initials.) whose music was written by Manuel Villacañas and published by the Unión Musical Española in 1965. Also worth mentioning is the pasodoble Aquí está El Viti ("Here is El Viti") by the author Felipe Blanco Aguirre.

As for the world of jazz, in 1960, Duke Ellington recorded the arrangement for piano of El Viti, a song by jazz composer and musician Gerald Wilson. In 1966, jazz pianist Jack Wilson did a version of this on the trumpet called The Matador in El Viti's honour, which was the only song that he recorded with Duke Ellington's orchestra. Paul Gonsalves, another jazzman, recorded a further version of this song with Duke Ellington's orchestra in 1962, this time with the title El Matador: El Viti, which was published on the big band record Jazz Masters (100 Ans de Jazz).

== In legend ==
Bullfighting writer Paco Cañamero has argued that El Viti's legendary status rests on more than statistics: the 14 rides on shoulders through Las Ventas' Great Gate (plus two as a novillero). Instead, it rests on the mark he left on tauromachy as a bullfighter and as a person. Cañamero described him as a pillar of the 1960s, a decade when numerous bullfighters competed for top billing, and, alongside Diego Puerta and Paco Camino, part of what Cañamero called the "holiest trinity" of the bullfighting world.

== Distinctions ==
In 1997, El Viti received the Medalla de Oro de las Bellas Artes (Gold Medal of the Fine Arts), awarded by Spain's Ministry of Culture.

In 2009, he received the Premio de las Artes de Castilla y León (Castile and León Arts Prize) for his professional career as a bullfighter, "whose long career raised him to reach tauromachy's heights."

In 2011, he received the Medalla de Oro de la provincia de Salamanca (Gold Medal of the Province of Salamanca), awarded by the Salamanca Provincial Council for the support of the province's cultural development.

On 8 October 2015 in Valladolid, he received the Premio Tauromaquia de Castilla y León 2015 ("Castile and León Bullfighting Prize"), created by the Junta of Castile and León this same year, from Juan Vicente Herrera, who was then the junta's president.
