= Antonio Bienvenida =

Venezuelan-born Spanish bullfighter (1922–1975)

Personal information
- Nationality: Spanish
- Born: Antonio Mejías Jiménez; 25 June 1922 Caracas, Venezuela
- Died: 7 October 1975 (aged 53) Madrid, Spain
- Resting place: Sacramental de Santa María, Madrid
- Monument: Sculpture outside Las Ventas
- Occupation: Bullfighter
- Years active: 1939–1974

Antonio Mejías Jiménez (Spanish: [anˈtonjo meˈxias xiˈmeneθ]; 25 June 1922 – 7 October 1975), better known as Antonio Bienvenida (Spanish: [bjembeˈniða]), was a Venezuelan-born Spanish bullfighter who belonged to the Bienvenida bullfighting dynasty. Eleven times he came out, borne on his fellow bullfighters' shoulders, through the Great Gate at Las Ventas (a great honour in the bullfighting world) as one of the most important bullfighting figures of the 1950s. Among bullfighting aficionados, the Bienvenida dynasty has been one of the most glorious in tauromachy's history. It was founded by Manuel Mejías Rapela Bienvenida, nicknamed "El Papa Negro" ("The Black Pope"), itself a nickname for the superior general of the Society of Jesus, and in this case, it was meant to distinguish him from the head of the bullfighting "church", Ricardo Torres Reina "Bombita".

== Early life ==
Owing to his father Manuel Mejías Rapela's bullfighting profession, Bienvenida was born in Caracas. Shortly thereafter, his family moved to Seville, where Bienvenida's mother was from, and where Bienvenida was baptized. Later on, the family moved to Madrid. Bienvenida fought his first bull calf at the age of five and began to act as a becerrista (a novice who fights yearling calves) in 1936, presenting himself at the Madrid bullring on 3 August 1939 to deliver the estocada (the sword thrust meant to kill the bull) to bull calves supplied by Terrones.

== Bullfighting career ==
In 1941, he emerged triumphant in four of the five fights that he had at Seville's bullring. On 18 September that same year, he was "consecrated" at Madrid's Las Ventas bullring, alternating with Joselito de la Cal and Rafael Ortega. His fight with the bull calf Naranjito, supplied by Antonio Pérez, would pass into bullfighting history as "that of three changed passes".

Bienvenida took his alternativa from his brother Pepote at the same bullring on 9 April 1942 in a fight with Miura bulls. A few months later, on 26 July 1942, at La Monumental, Barcelona's bullring, during a pase cambiado, Bienvenida suffered one of the most dangerous gorings in his career, which kept him away from the ring for more than two months. In his earliest years, he reaped successes, but he also knew failures. On 18 July 1944, he gave the alternativa at Las Ventas to the Mexican Carlos Arruza in the corrida that put an end to the "fear boycott" against Mexican bullfighters in Spain. That season was the only one when Bienvenida fought bulls in Mexico, making his début at Mexico City's Toreo de la Condesa bullring. All in all, he became the fashionable bullfighter, with attacks like the one in 1948, when a bull knocked him down and he saved himself with a kick from the ground. He was President of the Bullfighters' Social Collective Fund and organized many charitable bullfights. Beginning in 1952 he denounced the fraud of "shaving" a bull's horns (that is, blunting the tips), which earned him as many foes as friends. Between 1953 and 1957, he had five glory-filled seasons, after which he fell into a professional rut. Among his good afternoons was the historic bullfight on 3 July 1955, in which he fought bulls for free in a benefit for fellow bullfighters who were needy, and in Madrid he delivered the estocada by himself to six bulls supplied by Francisco Galache. In 1956 he received the Golden Ear from the Madrid Press Association, and that same year he entered the Order of Beneficence and he was awarded the Cruz de Beneficencia (Cross of Beneficence) for the altruistic work that developed while he presided over the Bullfighters' Social Collective Fund. At those heights of his career, he had suffered fifteen serious gorings (or "little deaths", as he himself liked to say). In 1957, he broke a leg in a charitable bullfight for those affected by the 1957 Valencia flood, and the next year, a bull named Cubitoso, supplied by Sánchez Cobaleda, seriously wounded him in the neck. On 18 May 1959, he fought what many describe as his best bullfight. He did it together with Pepe Luis Vázquez and Julio Aparicio Martínez. The three were borne shoulder-high afterwards. Bienvenida dedicated his bull to Conchita Cintrón, the first woman bullfighter, who defined him as the "essence of lordship in bullfighter gestures". However, as José Luis Suárez-Guanes writes in his biography of Bienvenida, "That afternoon Antonio wrote the first page of the history of Las Ventas, of Saint Isidore and of his biography".

Passes with a smooth, ironed muleta, without any wrinkle. At once broad and soft, deep and harmonious, transmitting to the public the divine master of the art. All on a span of ground, without a pause, with the bull delivered and the ring, his ring, at his feet

— José Luis Suárez-Guanes

As for criticism, throughout Bienvenida's career he received as many positive appraisals as negative, and indeed, he had both good and bad afternoons, and he could either end up coming out the Great Gate or be showered with insults from the stands. Throughout his career, he came out through the Great Gate at the Las Ventas bullring no fewer than eleven times, behind only El Viti (14) and Paco Camino (12).

In the years that followed, Bienvenida took several tours through the New World. On 25 May 1963, already having become a consecrated figure, he gave the alternativa to Manuel Benítez, "El Cordobés" and in 1964, in San Sebastián de los Reyes, with a bull supplied by Cembrano, he fought what according to many critics was the best bullfight of his life. In 1966, when he was forty-four years old, he announced his retirement, and on 16 October, after fighting six bulls, Bienvenida's brother Pepe cut his coleta (pigtail — a bullfighter's symbol) at Las Ventas before his other brother Ángel Luis. He kept on participating in festivals until 1971, the year when he returned to the bullring. His reappearance after four years likewise took place at the Las Ventas bullring, on 18 May, when he confirmed Mexican bullfighter Curro Rivera Agüero's alternativa. On 30 May he was borne shoulder-high out through the Great Gate at Las Ventas for the eleventh and last time after killing the bulls from his own lot and Andrés Vázquez's besides, who had been wounded during the fight.

On 26 June 1971, Bienvenida participated in the commemorative anthological corrida marking the sesquicentenary of the Battle of Carabobo at the Monumental in Valencia, together with Luis Miguel Dominguín and César Girón on the day of his retirement. On 22 May 1973 at Las Ventas, he stood as "godfather" at the confirmation of Julio Robles's alternativa, while Palomo Linares bore witness. The bull was Pernote, supplied by the Caridad Cobaleda ranch. On 5 October 1974, Bienvenida definitively retired at Madrid's Vista Alegre bullring, this after 775 corridas and 54 novilladas, in which he had slain 113 bull calves and 1,628 bulls.

He was not only a period bullfighter, he knew how to be above passing fashions, in an insatiable quest for the essences of bullfighting.

— Rafael Gómez López-Egea

== Death ==
On 4 October 1975, the anniversary of his father's death, Bienvenida attended Mass at a church in Colmenar Viejo. Afterwards, he and his family went to Amelia Pérez Tabernero's farm in El Escorial, so that he could trial some heifers. After trying a few, one named Conocida, whom he had let through the gate and who was galloping into the field, turned about, came back into the trial yard and without warning charged Bienvenida, whom she spectacularly knocked head over heels. The incident caused serious injury to Bienvenida's vertebrae, which three days later (7 October) led to his death at the La Paz hospital in Madrid. He was 53 years old. The next day, his coffin was borne shoulder-high into the Las Ventas bullring by his fellow bullfighters, among whom were Ángel Peralta Pineda, Paco Camino, Curro Romero, Francisco Rivera Paquirri and Palomo Linares. Bienvenida was buried at Madrid's Sacramental de Santa María cemetery, in the family tomb.

== Homages ==
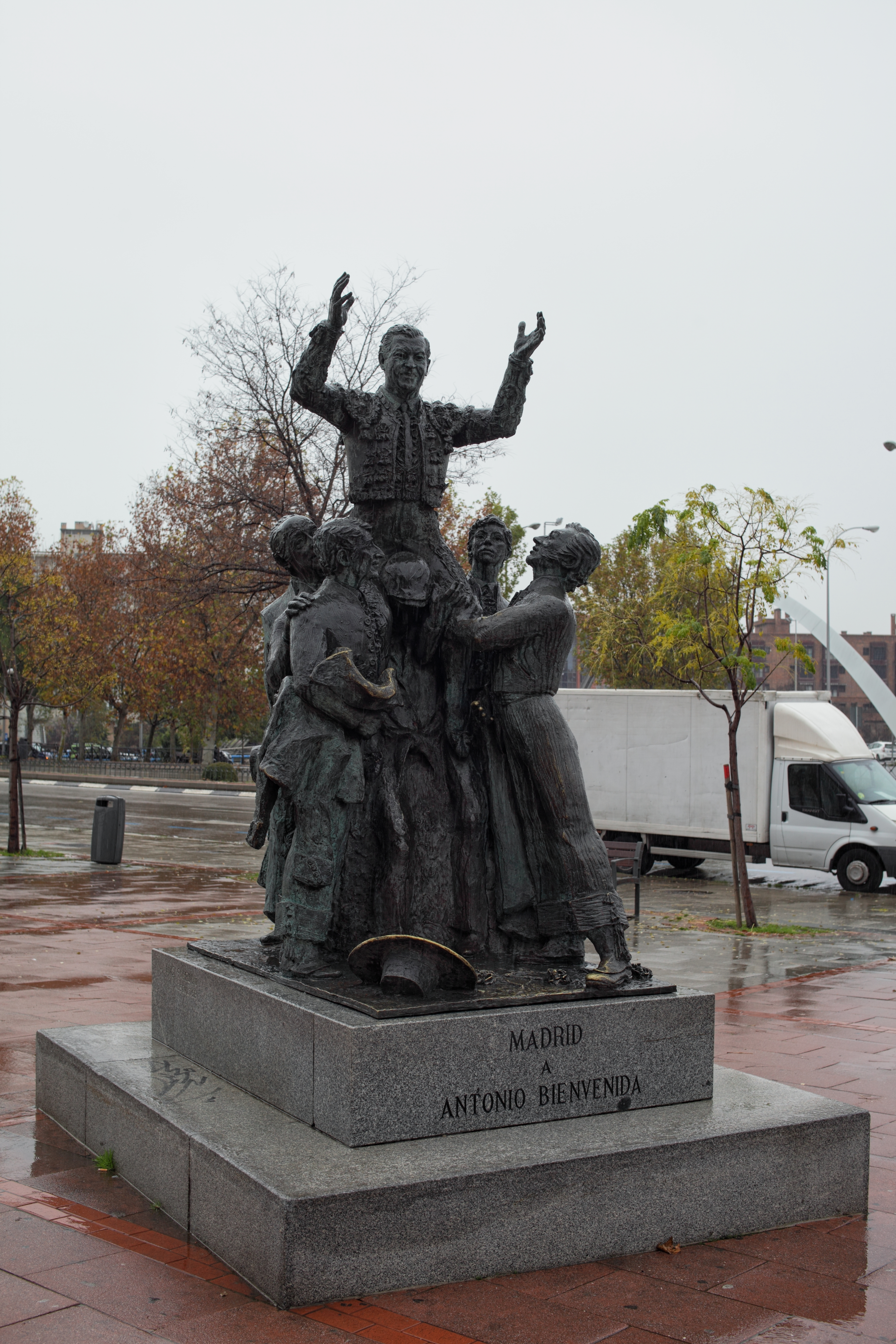
Sanguino's sculpture in homage to Bienvenida at Las Ventas, Madrid

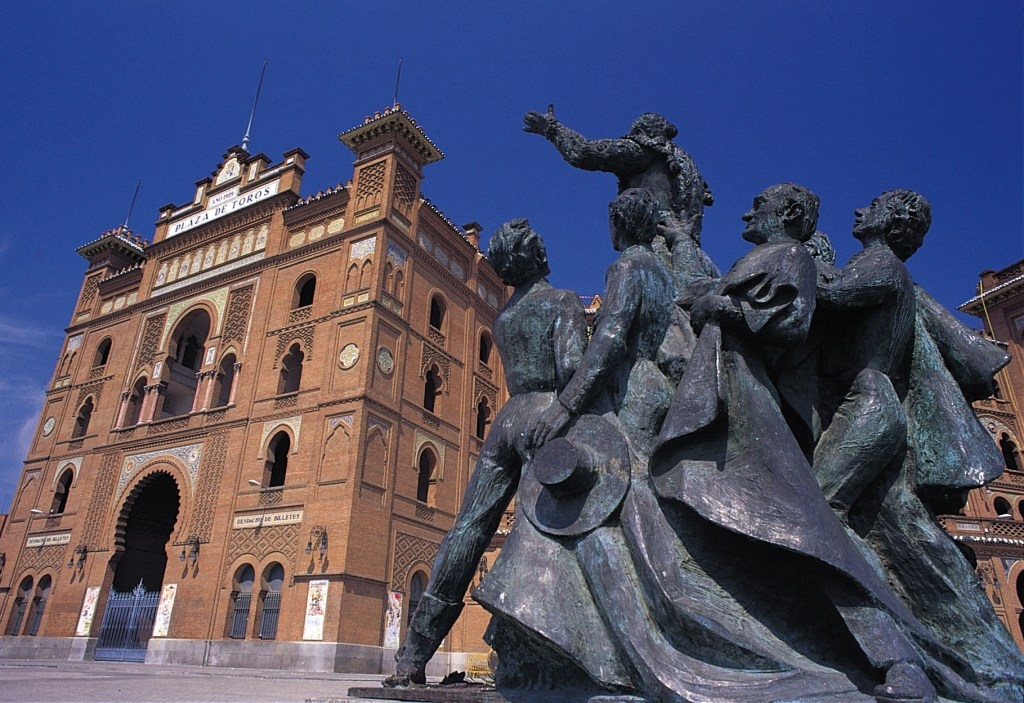
Sculpture in homage to Bienvenida outside Las Ventas

The main street at the Seville Fair bears his name. In 1977, the sculptural group to Bienvenida outside Las Ventas, executed by Luis Sanguino, was unveiled.

All that pertained to the saga of the Bienvenidas – and to Antonio Bienvenida in particular – was donated by Don Juan Murillo de Saavedra, Viscount of Burguillos, at the Club Taurino Extremeño (Extremaduran Bullfighting Club). The billing for the 2022 Charitable Bullfights was a homage to Antonio Bienvenida. Since 2003, the Círculo Taurino de Amigos de la Dinastía Bienvenida (Bienvenida Dynasty's Bullfighting Circle of Friends) has been awarding the Bienvenida Prizes for human values.

== Filmography ==
Bienvenida took part as an actor in a number of films:

- Aquel viejo molino ("That Old Mill"; 1946), directed by Ignacio F. Iquino and starring Adriano Rimoldi, Francisco Melgares and Carlos Agostí.
- Afternoon of the Bulls (Spanish: Tarde de toros; 1956), directed by Ladislao Vajda and starring Domingo Ortega, Félix Dafauce, Manolo Morán, María Asquerino and Pepe Isbert.
- La becerrada (1963; the title refers to a bullfight with a yearling bull), a comedy directed by José María Forqué and starring Fernando Fernán Gómez, Amparo Soler Leal, Nuria Torray, María José Alfonso and Antonio Ordóñez Araujo.
- Yo he visto la muerte ("I Have Seen Death"; 1965) starring Álvaro Domecq Díez, his son Álvaro Domecq Romero, Andrés Vázquez and Luis Miguel Dominguín.

== Personal life ==
Bienvenida was the fourth child born to his father Manuel Mejías Rapela Bienvenida, the legendary "Black Pope", and his mother Carmen Jiménez. He is the most celebrated of six brothers, the others being Manolo, Pepote, Rafael, Ángel Luis and Juanito — bullfighters all. His sister, Carmen Pilar, is now Manuel Mejías Rapela's only living direct descendant.

On 15 November 1948, Bienvenida wed María Luisa Gutiérrez. They had four children. Bienvenida was a brother of Seville's Hermandad de la Esperanza Macarena ("Brotherhood of the Hope of Macarena", a Catholic brotherhood whose seat is at Seville's Basilica of Macarena, where the Virgin of Hope of Macarena is venerated) and also a member of Opus Dei. He joined the latter as a supernumerary in 1969, and always considered his two meetings with Josemaría Escrivá de Balaguer, the institution's founder, to be high points in his life.

== Bibliography ==
- Cintrón, C., ¿Por qué vuelven los toreros?, 1977. ISBN 978-9681311353
- Gómez López-Egea, R., Antonio Bienvenida, 1990. ISBN 978-8471186867
- Mira, Filiberto: Antonio Bienvenida: Historia de un torero, 1977. ISBN 978-8440027634
- Santainés Cires, A., La dinastía de los Bienvenida, 1988. ISBN 978-8486778132
- Zabala, V., Hablan los viejos colosos del toreo,1976. ISBN 978-8473801768
