= José Luis Vázquez =

José Luis Vázquez can refer to:

- Pepe Luis Vázquez Garcés (1921–2013), Spanish bullfighter
- Pepe Luis Vázquez Silva (1957–2024), son of the above, also a Spanish bullfighter
- José Luis Vásquez (born 1947), Mexican water polo player
- José Luis Díaz Vázquez (born 1957), Spanish retired basketball player
