= José Vazquez =

José Vazquez may refer to:

- José Manuel Vázquez Yebra (1928–2001), Spanish politician and lawyer
- José Vazquez (footballer) (1940–2016), Argentine footballer
- José Vázquez (baseball) (born 1970), American baseball coach and former catcher
- Jose Vazquez-Cofresi (born 1975), American conga drummer and musician
- José Juan Vázquez (born 1988), Mexican footballer
- José Luis Vázquez Garcés (1921–2013), Spanish bullfighter
- José Luis Vázquez Silva (1957–2024), Spanish bullfighter

== See also ==
- José Vásquez (disambiguation)
