= Pepe Luis Vázquez =

Pepe Luis Vázquez can refer to:

- Pepe Luis Vázquez Garcés, a Spanish bullfighter;
- Pepe Luis Vázquez Silva, his son, also a Spanish bullfighter.
