= Pepe Luis Vázquez Garcés =

Spanish bullfighter (1921–2013)

José Luis Vázquez Garcés
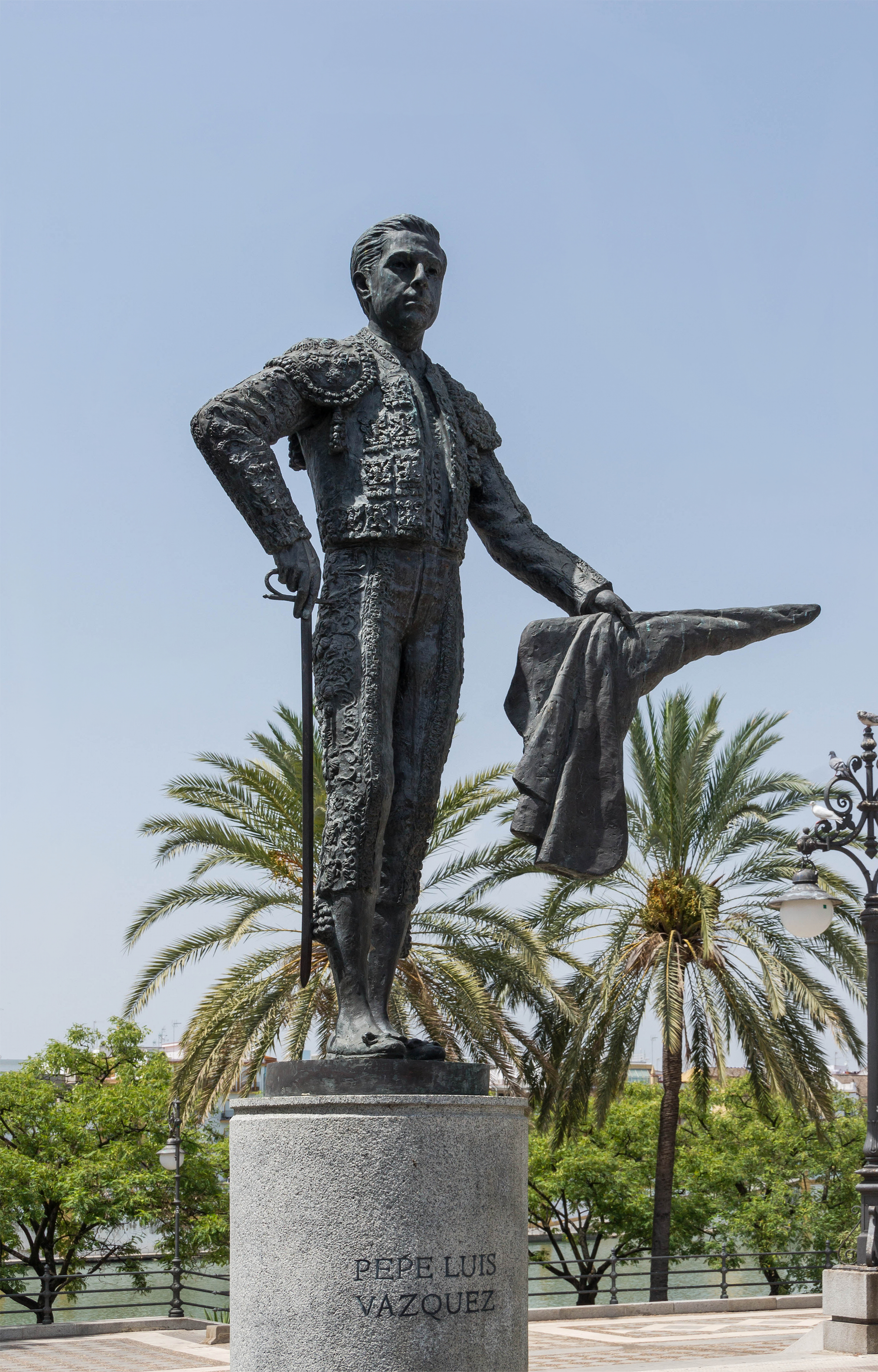
- Statue of Vázquez, outside Maestranza in Seville.

Personal information
- Nickname: Pepe Luis Vázquez
- Nationality: Spanish
- Born: 21 December 1921 Seville, Spain
- Died: 19 May 2013 (aged 91) Castilleja de la Cuesta, Spain
- Resting place: Cemetery of San Fernando, Seville
- Monument(s): Statue outside Real Maestranza, Seville; Mosaic at Las Ventas, Madrid
- Home town: Seville
- Occupation: Bullfighter
- Years active: 1937–1959
- Agent: Marcial Lalanda (apoderado)
- Spouse: Mercedes Silva Giménez (1934–2020)
- Children: José Luis Vázquez Silva; Ignacio Vázquez Silva; Rafael Vázquez Silva; Álvaro Vázquez Silva; Juan Vázquez Silva; Manolo Vázquez Silva; Mercedes Vázquez Silva
- Parents: José Vázquez Roldán (father); Concepción Garcés García (mother)
- Other interests: Spanish Fighting Bull husbandry

José Luis Vázquez Garcés (Spanish: [xoˈse ˈlwiz ˈβaθkeθ ɣaɾˈθes]; 21 December 1921 – 19 May 2013), better known as Pepe Luis Vázquez (Spanish: [ˈpepe]), the same name that his son would later use professionally, was a Spanish bullfighter, considered one of 20th-century bullfighting's most significant figures.

== Early life ==
Vázquez was born in Seville's San Bernardo neighbourhood on 21 December 1921, and was baptized on 3 January 1922. His father was José Vázquez Roldán, a foreman at the city slaughterhouse and in his youth, a novillero (novice bullfighter who fights yearling bulls). San Bernardo is known as the "bullfighter neighbourhood" for having been the cradle of so many bullfighters, with at least one writer likening it to a bullfighting brotherhood. As a boy, he was already learning about cattle's behaviour and tendencies at the slaughterhouse where his father worked. He went there for his first steps towards becoming a bullfighter. Among the invaluable knowledge that he gained at the slaughterhouse, before animals that were soon to be slaughtered, was the distances needed to incite the bull to charge. Many years later, after he had retired, Vázquez still believed that it was necessary to understand a bull's behaviour, and that without those experiences when he was quite young, he never would have developed his bullfighting skills.

== Vázquez's novillada ==
Vázquez first donned the suit of lights as a novillero on 18 July 1937, at the Plaza de toros de Las Palomas in Algeciras, with billing shared with Antonio Bienvenida, and the yearling bulls supplied by Juan Gallardo. On 5 June 1938, he had his début with picadores at the Plaza de toros de la Real Maestranza de Caballería de Sevilla, and even as a novillero he was billed together with Manolete, a bullfighter with whom he would share billing no fewer than one hundred and twenty-two times throughout his career. Manuel Calderón rounded out the bill that day, and the yearling bulls were once again supplied by Gallardo. Vázquez's first performance at the Las Ventas bullring took place on 13 July 1939, with yearling bulls from the Domingo Ortega ranch. Bullfighters Félix Almagro and Mariano García shared billing with him on what would turn out to be a tragic afternoon. While Vázquez saw great success, his fellow bullfighter, Félix Almagro from Torrijos, suffered a neck wound from the yearling bull that he was fighting (named either Capirote or Rondeño, depending on the source), consequently dying late in the evening in the bullring's own infirmary, despite a blood transfusion to make up for the blood that he had lost from his wound, which was in the jugular vein. Almagro was the first bullfighter to die at Las Ventas.

== Vázquez's alternativa ==
Vázquez took his alternativa, thus ending his novillada, at the Maestranza bullring in his hometown of Seville on 15 August 1940, with Pepe Bienvenida standing as his "godfather" and Gitanillo de Triana (Rafael Vega de los Reyes) as the witness. On 20 October that same year, his alternativa was confirmed at Las Ventas in Madrid by Marcial Lalanda (who would later become Vázquez's apoderado) and Rafael Ortega Gómez El Gallo. Attending the bullfights that day at General Francisco Franco's invitation was Reichsführer-SS Heinrich Himmler, who was visiting Spain at the time.

== Career as a matador ==
Beginning then, Vázquez fought bulls at Spain's and Latin America's foremost bullrings. In the years 1941 and 1942, he led the escalafón taurino (bullfighters' rankings). On 25 July 1943, while he was fighting a bull at the Santander bullring, he sustained a grievous goring to his face.

Vázquez's inimitable way of inciting bulls from the medios (central third of the bullring) with his muleta folded in his left hand like a cartridge, then unfolding it to give the bull a pase natural, with the bullfighter's feet together, aroused great enthusiasm from bullfight-goers. He called this his famous cartucho de pescao (roughly "fishing cartridge"), although this term had actually been coined by another great bullfighter, Manuel García Cuesta (El Espartero).

Vázquez appeared at only one corrida in 1952, and 29 March of the next year saw his only bullfight in that season, after which he announced his retirement from the bullring. He reappeared fleetingly in 1959, doing the paseíllo at Barcelona's La Monumental on 1 May, and bidding a last farewell to bullfighting in Madrid on 20 September that same year. He later gave himself over to raising fighting bulls, buying a ranch that came to be known as Hermanos Vázquez Silva ("Vázquez Silva Brothers").

Vázquez's brothers Manolo Vázquez (1930–2005) and Antonio Vázquez (1933–2022), as well as his son José Luis Vázquez Silva (1957–2024) were also bullfighters.

== Recognition ==
Besides being popularly recognized with the sobriquet "the Socrates of San Bernardo", in 1998, the Government of Spain awarded Vázquez the Gold Medal of Merit in the Fine Arts.

In 2001, a jury made up of bullfighting reporters and aficionados, headed by José Luis Sánchez Guanes and convened at the Lardhy restaurant in Madrid, included Vázquez in the list of the 20th century's ten most important bullfighters, together with the following matadors: José Gómez Joselito, Juan Belmonte, Domingo Ortega, Manolete, Antonio Bienvenida, Antonio Ordóñez Araujo, Paco Camino, Santiago Martín El Viti, and Curro Romero.

On 11 May 2002, an emotive homage was rendered to Vázquez at Madrid's Las Ventas bullring, with a tiled mosaic with the following text: "Pepe Luis Vázquez Garcés, armonía, belleza y gloria en la Historia de la Tauromaquia" ("Pepe Luis Vázquez Garcés, harmony, beauty and glory in the history of bullfighting"). Antonio Bienvenida's brother Ángel Luis Bienvenida also defined Vázquez by saying: "Ha sido la esencia del toreo, lo más puro, profundo y de mayor arte y personalidad que ha existido" ("He has been bullfighting's essence, the purest, deepest and of greatest art and personality that has existed").

On 20 April 2003, a monument in Vázquez's honour was unveiled in the city of Seville, right near the Real Maestranza bullring, presiding over which was the city's then mayor Alfredo Sánchez Monteseirín. On 4 June 2005, Vázquez received the Tenth Joaquín Vidal National University Prize for Tauromachy, granted by the Luis Mazzantini University Bullfighting Circle, which he collected from his likewise bullfighting son Pepe Luis Vázquez Silva's hands. The event took place at Madrid's King Juan Carlos University.

== Death ==
Vázquez died on 19 May 2013 at the age of ninety-one at the Nisa Hospital in Castilleja de la Cuesta, near Seville, after having been admitted a week earlier after a fall at his home. His death arose from health problems brought on by advanced age.

Officiating at Vázquez's funeral at the San Bernardo Church, which drew a crowd, was Father Ignacio Jiménez Sanchez-Dalp, who characterized Vázquez as, among other things, "maestro de maestros" and "Seville bullfighting's soul". Afterwards, the coffin containing Vázquez's body was taken to the Maestranza in Seville, borne by fellow bullfighters, among whom were Morante de la Puebla, Tomás Campuzano, Jesús Franco Cardeño, and Curro Durán along with banderilleros Finito de Triana and Susoni, who took it round the bullfighting ground inside as a posthumous homage to his person. There were ovations an shouts of "¡Torero, torero, torero!" from the mourners gathered at the bullring. Vázquez was then borne shoulder-high through the Prince's Gate (Puerta del Príncipe) one last time. He was buried at Seville's Cemetery of San Fernando.

Attending Vázquez's funeral, beyond those already mentioned, were bullfighters Curro Romero (along with his wife, Carmen Tello), Rafael de Paula, Macandro, Manolo Cortés, Pepe Luis Vargas, Martín Pareja-Obregón, Eduardo Dávila Miura, Curro Díaz, Antonio Nazaré, Rafael Peralta, Alfonso Ordóñez, Luque Gago, El Ecijano, Manolo Vázquez Gago, and Rafael Torres along with fighting bull breeders such as Eduardo Miura, Álvaro Martínez Conradi and Juan José Arenas.

Vázquez's wife died on 11 January 2020 at the age of 85, while their son, Pepe Luis Vázquez Silva, also a bullfighter, died on 26 July 2024 at the age of 67.
