= Almagro =

Almagro (Spanish pronunciation: [alˈmaɣɾo]) may refer to:

== People ==
- Diego de Almagro (1475–1538), Spanish explorer
- Diego Almagro II (1520–1542), assassin of Spanish conquistador Francisco Pizarro
- Félix Almagro (1907–1939), Spanish bullfighter
- Luis Almagro (born 1963), Uruguayan lawyer, diplomat and politician
- Nicolás Almagro (born 1985), Spanish tennis player

== Places ==
- Almagro, Buenos Aires, Argentina
- Almagro, Samar, municipality of the Samar province, Philippines
- Almagro, Ciudad Real, Castile-La Mancha, Spain
- Almagro (Madrid), Spain

== Other ==
- Club Almagro, an Argentine football club from Almagro, Buenos Aires
- Estadio Almagro, a multi-use stadium in Buenos Aires, Argentina
- Diego de Almagro Island

== See also ==
- San Lorenzo de Almagro, an Argentine football club from Buenos Aires
