= Félix Almagro =

Spanish bullfighter (1907–1939)

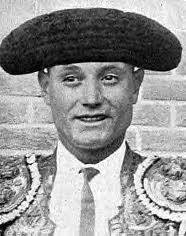
- Almagro in the 1930s

Personal information
- Nationality: Spanish
- Born: Félix Almagro González; 11 June 1907 Torrijos, Toledo
- Died: 13 July 1939 (aged 32) Las Ventas, Madrid
- Occupation: Bullfighter
- Years active: 1932–1939

Félix Almagro González (Spanish: [ˈfeliɣs alˈmaɣɾo ɣonˈθaleθ]; 11 June 1907 – 13 July 1939) was a Spanish bullfighter who died at Madrid's Las Ventas bullring after being gored there by a yearling bull named Capirote or Rondeño (sources differ), thus earning himself the unenviable distinction of being the first bullfighter to be killed by a bull at Las Ventas.

== Biography ==
Almagro was born on 11 June 1907 in Torrijos, a small town in the Province of Toledo in central Spain. His beginnings were quite humble. His family ran a fruit stand in the street in Torrijos now known as Avenida de la Estación. Unlike many boys who dreamt of becoming bullfighters, though, his aspiration to do just this only began rather late. He nonetheless honed his bullfighting skills at the local capeas (somewhat less than professional-level rural bullfighting events), and was already 25 years old when he first presented himself at Madrid as a novillero (novice bullfighter who fights yearling bulls). This took place on 31 July 1932, but the venue where it happened is a point of some confusion, with some sources saying that the event was held at Las Ventas, and others saying that it unfolded at the old bullring on the Aragón Highway. Others still do not specify which bullring was used. Young bulls were supplied by the Emilio Bueno ranch, and Almagro found himself sharing billing with Antonio Labrador "Pinturas" and Natalio Sacristán Fuentes.

Almagro fought in 11 novilladas that year (one source says 13). In 1933 he strengthened his reputation, especially with the estoque, because although he lacked style, he became a confident and valiant bullfighter. He saw his fortunes rising, with 20 bullfighting contracts coming his way that same year, and 24 the next, always delivering good successes, but he nevertheless never reached a place of prominence in the bullfighting world.

In 1935, at what was only the second bullfighting event at Madrid's newly opened bullring, Las Ventas, Almagro was wounded, thus becoming the first bullfighter to suffer an injury at Las Ventas. It would not be his only unwanted distinction in connection with Las Ventas.

On 3 May 1936, Almagro achieved a resounding success at the Córdoba bullring, alternating with Manolete and Pascual Márquez. Only a bit more than two months later, though, the Spanish Civil War broke out, and like many bullfighters, Almagro saw his career disrupted by the hostilities. He chose to go to France, and it was there, at the bullring in Marseille on 4 July 1937 (one source says 14 July), that he took his alternativa with Francisco Royo Turón "Lagartito" standing as "godfather".

Because Almagro's alternativa was performed outside Spain, it was never acknowledged as legitimate, and he apparently only had it done because it was required if he was to get into the zone in his own wartorn country that was controlled by the Nationalists. Once Almagro had returned there, he once again became a novillero and, indeed, never did officially become a matador de toros.

Once back in Spain, Almagro appeared at 24 novilladas for the benefit of Auxilio Social (a Francoist humanitarian aid organization), sustaining three gorings in the process: 15 October 1932 in Ávila and 25 August 1933 in Madrid.

Almagro also did military service, and served as a driver.

On 24 May 1939, Las Ventas celebrated its grand reopening in the wake of the Civil War's end, and the inaugural bullfighting event was billed as the Corrida de la Victoria, in honour of the Nationalist victory; high-ranking officials from Francisco Franco's régime were in attendance. Almagro was not at this corrida, but it would turn out to be less than two months before Las Ventas bore witness to a most unfortunate turn of events for him.

=== Death ===
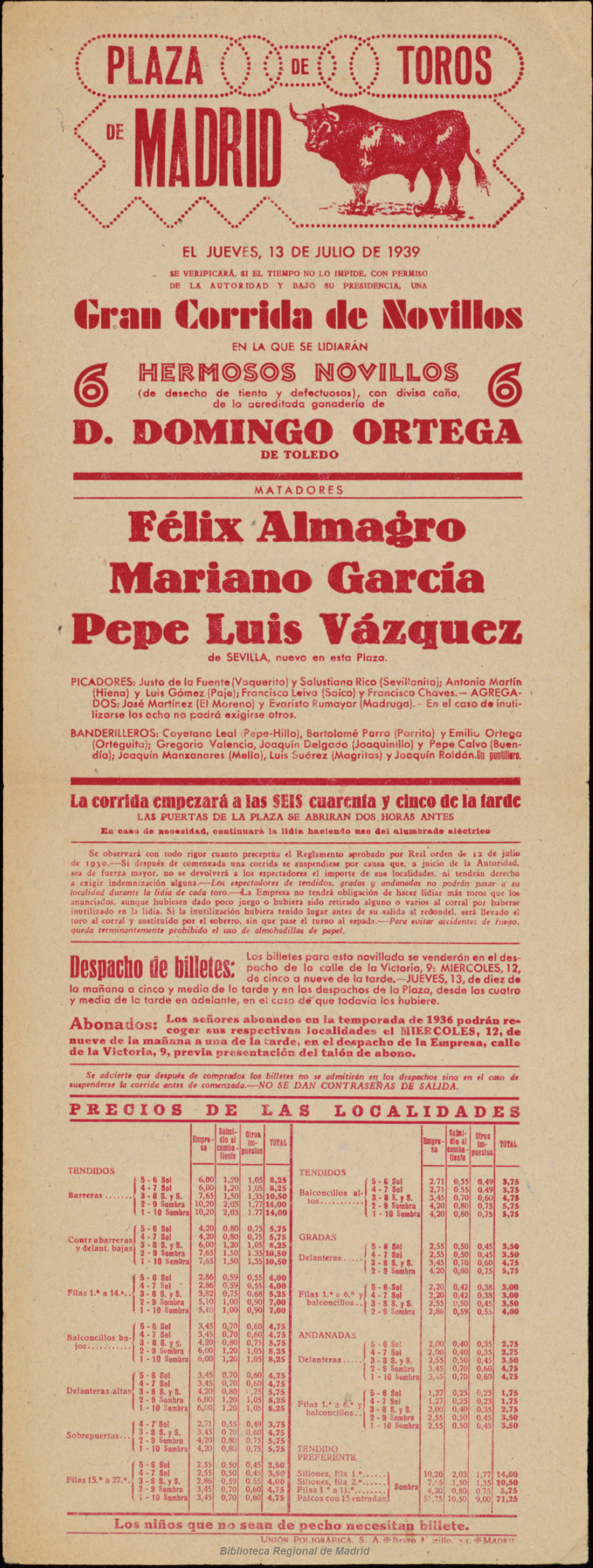
Poster advertising the upcoming corrida at which Almagro would be killed.

Almagro was appearing at a novillada at Las Ventas in Madrid on 13 July 1939, alternating with Mariano García and Pepe Luis Vázquez, at which young bulls had been supplied by the Domingo Ortega ranch. For Vázquez, this afternoon was his presentation at Las Ventas. Things went very badly for Almagro, however. While he was facing the afternoon's fourth bull, he was gored in the neck, with the bull's horn puncturing a jugular vein. Despite immediate attention, he did not make it through the night. Félix Almagro's goring, according to an interviewee named Giraldillo, was an accident that can only be explained by the nervous state in which the man found himself. He was knocked down when passing with the muleta and, when the pass was being done, he stood up in front of the bull, receiving the wound. Almagro was given a blood transfusion – a direct one from Madrid lawyer Mariano Arrazola, who gave amply – to make up for the blood that he had lost from the wound to his jugular, but he nevertheless died at ten after eleven that same night. It is somewhat unclear as to whether the bull's name was Capirote or Rondeño, but many sources list the former and not the latter.

A statement issued by the medical team that fought to save Almagro's life, signed by Doctor Jiménez Guinea, read as follows:

The bullfighter Félix Almagro suffered a blunt wound from a bull's horn in the supraclavicular region, cutaneous muscle, and superficial middle cervical aponeurosis, injuring the inferior thyroid artery, brachial plexus, and prevertebral muscle with two tracks, one in front of the aforementioned muscles and with an extension of about seven centimetres, and another that goes behind said muscles affecting the pleural dome. The injured man was admitted in a state of intense shock, his prognosis being very serious.

Almagro's death at Las Ventas – he was never transferred to hospital and died at the bullring's own infirmary, some six hours after being taken there – made him the first of thus far five men who have been killed by bulls at Las Ventas over the years. The other four have been matador Pascual Márquez in 1941, bullring carpenter Pablo Pérez Gómez in 1957 (he had supposedly been safe in the callejón, but then a bull named Cedacero inadvertently got in), the banderillero Manuel Leyton "El Coli" in 1964, and another banderillero, Antonio González in 1988.

== Personal life ==
Almagro had no wife or children, and thus has no living descendants today. Furthermore, what family he had fled Torrijos in the Civil War. This might be why he seems to have left so little trace of himself, even in his hometown's consciousness. He has practically been forgotten.
