= Got (bull) =

World's first cloned Spanish Fighting bull

Got is a fighting bull (born 18 May 2010 in Spain) who was cloned from another fighting bull named Vasito by teams at the Prince Felipe Research Center and the Valencia Foundation for Veterinary Research using nuclear transfer. This is thought to be the first time a fighting bull has been successfully cloned.

Vicente Torrent from the Valencia Foundation for Veterinary Research, who led the project, said that Got was the culmination of three years of research into how to preserve "valuable bull genes" costing €28,000.
