= Torrijos, Spain =

Torrijos
- Municipality
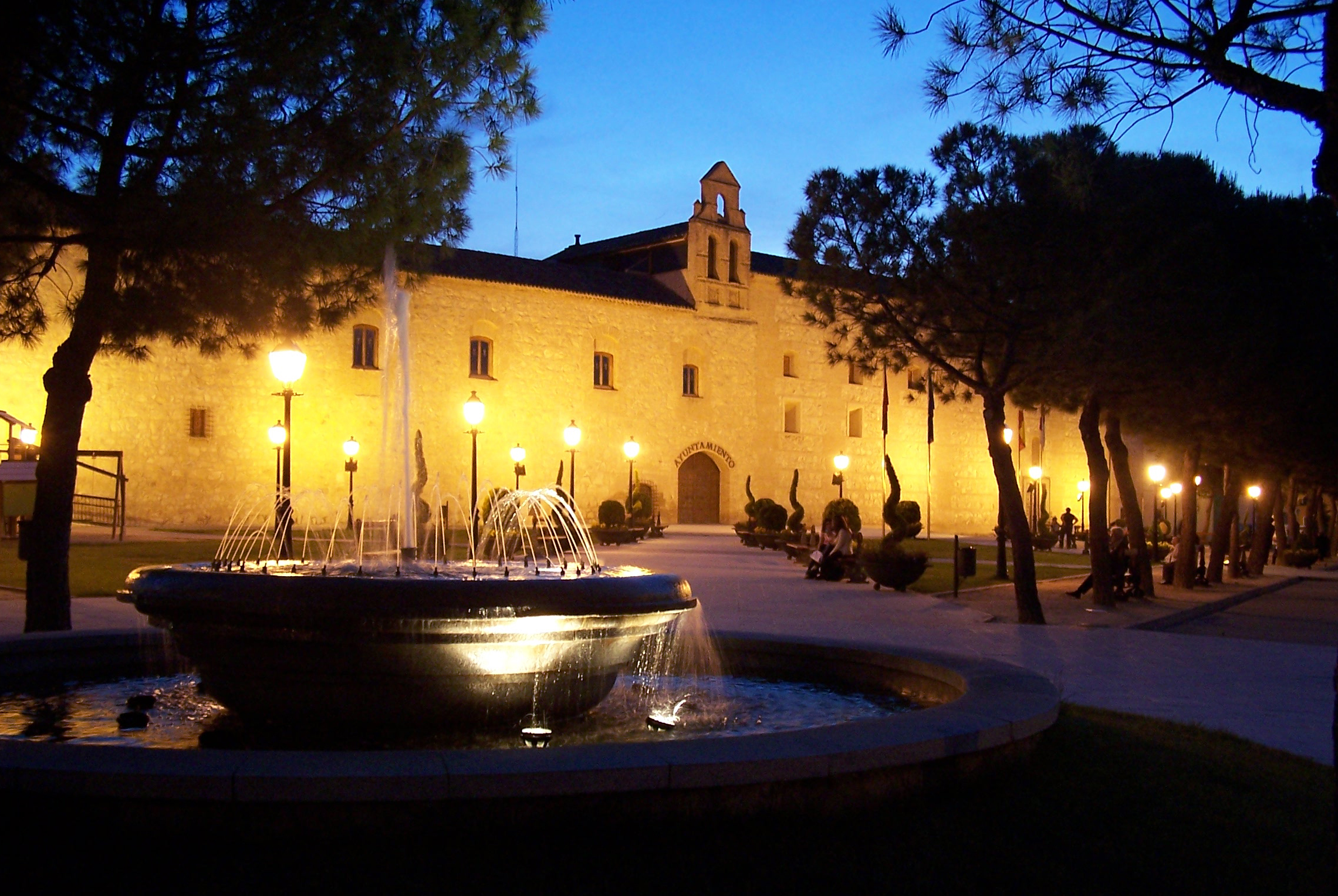
- Town hall

- Flag Coat of arms

- Location in Spain Torrijos (Spain)
- Coordinates: 39°59′0″N 4°16′53″W
- Country: Spain
- Autonomous community: Castilla–La Mancha
- Province: Toledo

Area
  - Total: 17.34 km^{2} (6.70 sq mi)
- Elevation: 529 m (1,736 ft)

Population (2025-01-01)
  - Total: 14,307
  - Density: 825.1/km^{2} (2,137/sq mi)
- Demonym(s): Torrijeño, ña
- Time zone: UTC+1 (CET)
  - Summer (DST): UTC+2 (CEST)
- Postal code: 45500

Torrijos is a municipality in the province of Toledo, Castilla–La Mancha, Spain. As of 1 January 2022, it had a registered population of 13,678. The municipality spans across a total area of 17.34 km^{2}.

== History ==
A Christian army on its way to Toledo took control over the place on behalf of Alfonso VI in 1085, thereby becoming a realengo ('royal demesne').

Torrijos was gifted to the archbishop of Toledo in 1214, in reward for the latter's help in the Battle of Navas de Tolosa, and so it became a dominion of the Mitre of Toledo. Torrijos enjoyed a sizeable Jewish community, which sided with the losing side in the Castilian Civil War and which also suffered, although to a lesser extent than other locations, the 1391 pogroms. In the context of the 1449 urban revolts in Toledo, a Toledan army under Pedro Girón sacked Torrijos in 1450. Torrijos was bought away from the Archdiocese of Toledo in 1482, and it was incorporated to the Estate of Maqueda, also becoming a town.

== Demographics ==
Historical population
| Year | Pop. | ±% |
|---|---|---|
| 1900 | 2,923 | — |
| 1910 | 3,524 | +20.6% |
| 1920 | 3,666 | +4.0% |
| 1930 | 4,059 | +10.7% |
| 1940 | 3,875 | −4.5% |
| 1950 | 4,432 | +14.4% |
| 1960 | 5,163 | +16.5% |
| 1970 | 6,362 | +23.2% |
| 1981 | 7,994 | +25.7% |
| 1991 | 9,522 | +19.1% |
| 2001 | 10,173 | +6.8% |
| 2011 | 13,454 | +32.3% |
| 2021 | 13,583 | +1.0% |
| 2023 | 13,885 | +2.2% |
Source: INE

== Notable people ==
- Félix Almagro (1907–1939), bullfighter, first to be killed by a bull at Las Ventas

== See also ==
- Torrijos railway station
