= José Vásquez =

José Vásquez may refer to:

== Sports ==
- José Vásquez, water polo player for Mexico at the 1968 Summer Olympics
- José Luis Vásquez (born 1957), Peruvian former football player and manager
- José Sebastián Vásquez (born 1982), Argentine footballer
- Jose Vasquez (soccer) (born 1969), retired Mexican-American soccer player
- José Vásquez (beach volleyball) (born 1972), Venezuelan beach volleyball player at the 2002 Central American and Caribbean Games
- José Vásquez (judoka) (born 1979), Dominican Republic judoka
- Jose Vasquez (ice hockey) (born 1985), American ice hockey player who played for the Indiana Blizzards, Queen City Storm and West Michigan Blizzard

== Other ==
- Jose Vasquez Aguilar (1900–1980), Filipino awardee of the Ramon Magsaysay Award and award for government service
- Bishop José Vásquez Silos, who ordained Francisco Robles Ortega
- José Arturo Vásquez Machado (died 2009), governor of Cabañas department in the Republic of El Salvador, 1994–2003

== See also ==
- José Vazquez (disambiguation)
