= Pepe Luis Vázquez Silva =

Spanish bullfighter (1957–2024)

José Luis Vázquez Silva
Personal information
- Nickname: Pepe Luis Vázquez
- Nationality: Spanish
- Born: 9 June 1957 Seville, Spain
- Died: 26 de julio de 2024 (68 años) Carmona, Spain
- Resting place: Private
- Home town: Seville
- Occupation: Bullfighter
- Years active: 1979–2018
- Agent: Manuel Morilla (apoderado)
- Parents: Pepe Luis Vázquez Garcés (1921–2013) (father); Mercedes Silva Giménez (1934–2020) (mother)
- Relative(s): Manuel Vázquez Silva (brother) six other siblings Manolo Vázquez Garcés (uncle)

José Luis Vázquez Silva (Spanish: [xoˈse ˈlwiz ˈβaθkeθ ˈsilβa]; 9 June 1957 – 26 July 2024), better known as Pepe Luis Vázquez (Spanish: [ˈpepe]), the same name that his father had used professionally, was a Spanish bullfighter, the youngest in a bullfighting "dynasty" in Seville that stretches back to the nineteenth century.

== Early life ==
Vázquez was born on 9 June 1957, the eldest of what would eventually be seven siblings from the marriage between Pepe Luis Vázquez Garcés and Mercedes Silva Giménez. By the time when Vázquez was born into this bullfighting family, his father had retired from bullfighting but in 1959, when the younger Pepe was two years old, the elder Pepe went back to the bullring for one season. Since Vázquez Garcés was one of Spain's most celebrated bullfighters, even eventually being named one of the twentieth century's ten most important, bullfighting was a pervasive influence in the Vázquez household. Nevertheless, the two-year-old's mother was determined to keep him, and all her other children, away from the profession of tauromachy; however, in the end, her efforts were futile. Although her eldest son began by finishing high school and then going to college and studying agronomy, he soon changed his mind about his future, and decided that he would follow in his father's footsteps. He wanted to be a bullfighter.

== Vázquez's novillada ==
Vázquez achieved considerable fame as a novillero (novice bullfighter who fights yearling bulls), with commentator Antonio Lorca observing that Vázquez's fame as a novillero reached quite a bit higher than it ever would later in his career as a matador. For instance, on 13 March 1979, he made a great impression on the bullfight-goers at Valencia and was obliged to walk a lap of the bullfighting ground after each one of the bulls that he had slain, both of which had been supplied by the Marqués de Domecq ranch. This was late in his novillada, and he shared billing on this afternoon with Juan Antonio Ruiz (known as "Espartaco") and Francisco Ojeda. His form and his personality – along with his prominent "dynastic" name – drew attention on this occasion.

He had his début with picadores on 22 May 1979 in Alburquerque, alternating with Mary Fortes, a novillera who would leave the bullring four years later, without ever rising to matadora, to become a businesswoman, a bullfighting critic, a bull breeder and a teacher at a bullfighting school in Málaga. Thereafter, though, Vázquez still fought yearling bulls without picadores, with some successes that rather stood out, such as the one that he achieved on 20 August 1979 at Lloret de Mar, a town in Catalonia, when he was awarded both the ears from his second bull, with his two companions who shared billing that day, the Mexican matador Mariano Ramos, and the rejoneadora Emi Zambrano.

Vázquez first trod the bullfighting ground at Madrid's Las Ventas, Spain's foremost bullring, on 9 September 1979, alternating with Fernando Vera and Aguilar Granada, and facing bulls supplied by the Torrestrella ranch. He fulfilled 35 contracts that year and 41 the next. His name was very fashionable on minor bullfighting bills, but the results at many of these events fell rather short of what he had hoped for, as witnessed by the mere fourteen ears that he cut in 1980; this was considered a small number against what other bullfighters achieved. As commentator Paco March diplomatically put it many years later, Vázquez's mark in bullfighting arose not so much from his statistics as from his bullfighting itself, which he did with fondness and charisma, among other qualities, "to the rhythm of a heart that beat systoles and diastoles of art and purity." He did leave an impression during these seasons, though.

== Vázquez's alternativa ==
Vázquez took his alternativa – thus ending his novillada – in a ceremony at the Maestranza bullring in Seville on 19 April 1981. Standing as his "godfather" was his own uncle, Manolo Vázquez Garcés, while famous Spanish bullfighter Curro Romero stood as the witness, making this event a very strong draw for aficionados. Two ranches supplied the bulls for this important event in Vázquez's professional life, with some from Juan Pedro Domecq, and some from Jandilla, including the bull used in the ceremony, named Desesperado and weighing 482 kg. The bullfighting itself did not stand out, with nothing worthy of note happening. He did receive an ovation for the fight with the Jandilla bull, however, but silence for his second fight that day.

Vázquez had confirmation of his alternativa on 23 May that same year at Las Ventas in Madrid. Standing once again as "godfather" was his uncle Manolo, but the witness this time was bullfighter Curro Vázquez (no kin). He fought four bulls supplied by the Socorro Sánchez-Dalp ranch at this event, although the fights were rather lacklustre, with nothing worthy of note happening in any.

== Career as a matador ==
After Vázquez's confirmation as a fully-fledged matador, he had good and bad afternoons.

On home ground at the Maestranza on 21 June 1984, Vázquez slew six bulls at the la Prensa bullfights, supplied by Gabriel Rojas. Otherwise, nothing extraordinary happened in those fights.

On the other hand, Vázquez also took part in Saint Michael's Fair (Feria de San Miguel) in Seville in 1984 in a morning bullfight on 29 September, the day after Paquirri's funeral (the corrida had been postponed), substituting for José María Manzanares (the elder). The bullfighting featured two bulls from the Jandilla ranch. Tomás Campuzano and Espartaco rounded out the billing that day, and for his efforts, Vázquez was awarded two ears.

Vázquez appeared in only five bullfights that whole year, and those two ears that he was awarded led to a total of only five in 1984, together with the three that he was awarded at an engagement in Huelva. In 1985, Vázquez appeared on the bullfighting bill only 23 times, but at none of these events did he emerge triumphant. This series of disappointing performances led to a downturn in the number of contracts that he could secure, and thus in his fortunes. Some of his appearances in the 1985 season were, however, noteworthy. During the Seville Fair, he faced a tame bull supplied by Gabriel Hernández that caught him in spectacular fashion, but Vázquez avoided serious injury and finished the bullfight with pleasure and mastery. On 22 May, he appeared at a corrida in Madrid with bulls supplied by Torrealta. Also on the bill that day were Curro Romero and Curro Vázquez. The afternoon's third bull was Ropavieja ("Old Clothing"), a thoroughbred bull with which Vázquez scored 15 perfect naturales. Vázquez himself described it thus:

I liked the starting bull. I couldn't stop him with the cape because he attacked abruptly. When I took the muleta, I knew I had a tough job. I had to do everything soon. It was windy and it didn't draw him into the medios (central third of the bullring). It wasn't many strokes of the muleta, about fourteen or fifteen, but everything was done with great pleasure. It was not a complete task, but it reached the public. I struck with the sword and cut off his ear.

On 7 June 1985, Vázquez was on the bill at Las Ventas along with Curro Romero and Julio Robles, fighting bulls from the Torrealta ranch.

That same year, during Huelva's Columbian Festivals, Vázquez faced a bull from the ranch of Hermanos Sampedro in a fight that was quite memorable for its artistic quality. Thereafter, Vázquez's bullfighting career had its upturns and downturns, and something needed to be done. It was in 1988 that Vázquez's apoderado ("manager" or "agent"), Manuel Morilla managed to get him on the bill at the Maestranza for four afternoons in an attempt to breathe new life into his bullfighting career, but nothing much came of this.

On 25 May 1989, also in Seville, Vázquez was seriously gored. He had not appeared at the Seville Fair that year and was instead performing in the La Prensa bullfights. He performed the paseíllo with José Luis Parada and the novillero Martín Pareja Obregón. The bull that Vázquez faced that day was supplied by Gabriel Rojas, and was named Estudiante ("Student"). Estudiante caught Vázquez squarely, grievously wounding him. At first, the injury did not seem very bad, but as Don Ramón Vila's mandatory medical report makes clear, Vázquez's wound needed serious attention, a "wound with an entrance hole at the level of the upper third of the left thigh, on its inner side, which reaches up to the abdominal cavity." Nevertheless, on 13 August the same year, he appeared at a corrida once again, this time at La Monumental in Barcelona, sharing billing with Lucio Sandín and two rejoneadores, Antonio Correas and Luis Domecq, with bulls supplied by Antonio Pérez de San Fernando.

The 1991 bullfighting season got off to a disappointing start for Vázquez. It was on 24 March that he did his first paseíllo in Madrid, and it was a hellish day that found the city in the grips of a windstorm. It might have made sense to suspend the Palm Sunday celebrations, but the corrida went ahead nonetheless. He alternated with Frascuelo and Pepín Jiménez. The wind, every bullfighter's foe, hindered any truly impressive bullfighting. The bulls bore the old Aleas brand (now known as Don José Vázquez Fernández). Vázquez got to fight two of the six.

The next month, Vázquez was billed alongside José Luis Parada and Fernando Lozano at the Seville Fair for 8 April. The bulls were supplied by the Portuguese ranch João António Romão de Moura. Vázquez got an ear from one of the bulls.

Later that month, on 21 April, much to some people's surprise, Vázquez went into the Maestranza bullring in Seville to fight Miura bulls, known for their sheer size and aggressiveness, and even cunning. Vázquez's father had made something of a name for himself fighting Miuras over many years, and was even good friends with the Miura rancher. The billing was shared with Ruiz Miguel and Manili. The younger Vázquez came through the corrida with his dignity intact, and he did cut something of a figure in his father's honour, with his feet tightly together.

Vázquez faced Miuras again at the Maestranza on 3 May 1991 (one source says 1992) with the same fellow bullfighters as before, but in a somewhat unseemly incident, when Vázquez was in the bullring with the afternoon's sixth bull, three warnings were sounded without him ever delivering the estocada (the sword thrust meant to kill the bull), and as a result, the bull was sent back to the corrals.

In the seasons that followed, Vázquez's presence at Spain's bullrings was reduced to token appearances, although almost every year he would announce a bullfight in Seville. However, 9 April 2002 was the last time that he was ever seen at the Maestranza in a suit of lights.

After years away from bullfighting, Vázquez announced his retirement at the Fair of the Consolation in Utrera on 8 September 2012. He in fact did participate in bullfighting after this, and indeed, his last bullfight took place on 6 October 2018 in Osuna.

== Later life and death ==
Less than a year after his last bullfight, in late July 2019, Vázquez suffered a stroke at his farm near Seville. This left him paralysed on the right side of his body. He made a partial recovery, having undergone rehabilitation thereafter. He even appeared at a few bullfighting events in Seville.

Vázquez died at his farm, El Canto, in Carmona, on 26 July 2024, at the age of 68. His lifeless body was found by the landlord. He had undergone minor surgery only days before his death. An autopsy confirmed shortly thereafter that Vázquez's death had been caused by an ischemic stroke, described by his brother Manuel Vázquez Silva as "fulminant".

Officiating at Vázquez's funeral was diocesan priest Antonio Romero Padilla. Among those who attended the funeral were many bullfighters, including ninety-year-old Curro Romero, considered the dean among Seville's bullfighters. Francisco "Paco" Ojeda, Espartaco, and Martín Pareja Obregón – with all of whom Vázquez had shared billing in his bullfighting days – were also there. His remains were cremated in Alcalá de Guadaíra, and the ashes were buried privately by his family.

Vázquez remained single throughout his life, and was described as being of an "introverted character".

== See also ==
- Pepe Luis Vázquez Garcés, Pepe Luis Vázquez Silva's father, also a bullfighter.
