= José Luis Vásquez (water polo) =

Mexican water polo player (born 1947)

Personal information
- Born: 21 September 1947 (age 77); Mexico City, Mexico

Sport
- Sport: Water polo

José Luis Vásquez (born 21 September 1947) is a Mexican water polo player. He competed in the men's tournament at the 1968 Summer Olympics.
