= Ahigal de los Aceiteros =

Ahigal de los Aceteiros
- Municipality
- Location in Salamanca

- Location in Spain.
- Coordinates: 40°52′31″N 6°44′52″W
- Country: Spain
- Autonomous community: Castile and León
- Province: Salamanca
- Comarca: El Abadengo

Government
  - Mayor: Oscar Sánchez Egido (People's Party)

Area
  - Total: 27.93 km^{2} (10.78 sq mi)
- Elevation: 633 m (2,077 ft)

Population (2025-01-01)
  - Total: 93
  - Density: 3.3/km^{2} (8.6/sq mi)
- Demonym: Patuntos
- Time zone: UTC+1 (CET)
  - Summer (DST): UTC+2 (CEST)
- Postal code: 37173

Ahigal de los Aceiteros is a village and municipality in the province of Salamanca, western Spain, part of the autonomous community of Castile and León.
