= Spanish Fighting Bull =

Cattle breed used in bull fights and spectacles

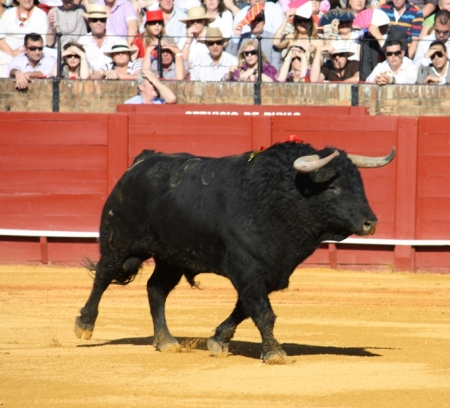
A Spanish Fighting Bull in Seville in April 2009.

The Spanish Fighting Bull is an Iberian heterogeneous cattle (Bos taurus) population. It is exclusively bred free-range on extensive estates in countries where bullfighting is organized. Fighting bulls are selected primarily for a certain combination of aggression, energy, strength and stamina. In order to preserve their natural traits, during breeding the bulls rarely encounter humans, and if so, never encounter them on foot.

== History of the breed ==
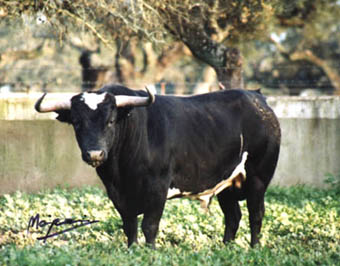
Bull from the ganadería Sánchez Cobaleda

Some commentators trace the origins of the fighting bull to wild bulls from the Iberian Peninsula and their use for arena games in the Roman Empire. Although the actual origins are disputed, genetic studies have indicated that the breeding stock have an unusually old genetic pool.

The aggression of the bull has been maintained and augmented by selective breeding and has come to be popular among the people of Spain and Portugal and the parts of Latin America where it took root during colonial rule, as well as parts of Southern France, where bullfighting spread during the 19th century.

In May 2010, Spanish scientists cloned the breed for the first time. The calf, named Got, meaning "glass" in Valencian, was cloned from a bull named Vasito and implanted in a Friesian surrogate cow.

== Breed characteristics ==
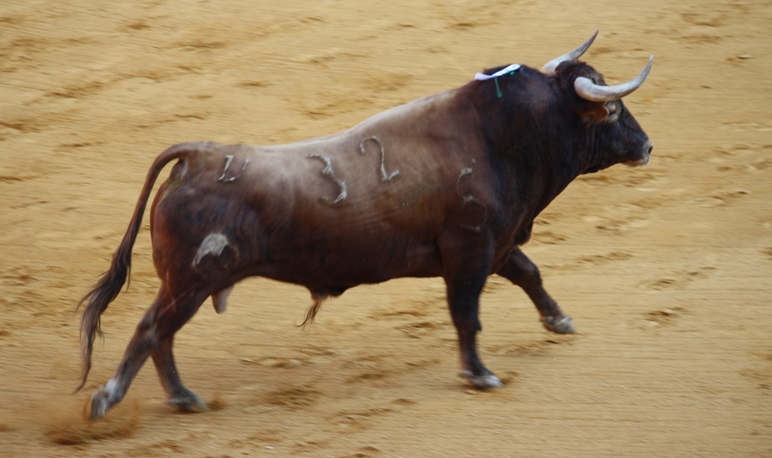
A Spanish Fighting Bull. Breed: Vegahermosa. Feria de Córdoba 2009

Fighting bulls are characterized by their aggressive behaviour, especially when solitary or unable to flee. Many are coloured black or dark brown, but other colours are normal. They reach maturity more slowly than meat breeds as they were not selected to be heavy, having instead a well-muscled "athletic" look, with a prominent morrillo, a complex of muscles over the shoulder and neck which gives the bull its distinctive profile and strength with its horns. The horns are longer than in most other breeds and are present in both males and females. Mature bulls weigh from 400 to 700 kg (880 to 1,540 lb).

Among fighting cattle, there are several "encastes" or subtypes of the breed. Of the so-called "foundational breeds", only the bloodlines of Vistahermosa, Vázquez, Gallardo and Cabrera remain today. In the cases of the last two only the ranches of Miura and Pablo Romero are deeply influenced by them. The so-called "modern foundational bloodlines" are Saltillo, Murube, Parladé and Santa Coloma, all of which are primarily composed of Vistahermosa blood.

Cattle have dichromatic vision, rendering them red-green colourblind and falsifying the idea that the colour red makes them angry; they just respond to the movements of the muleta. The red colouring is traditional and is believed to both conceal blood stains and provide a suitable light-dark contrast against the arena floor.

=== Growth ===
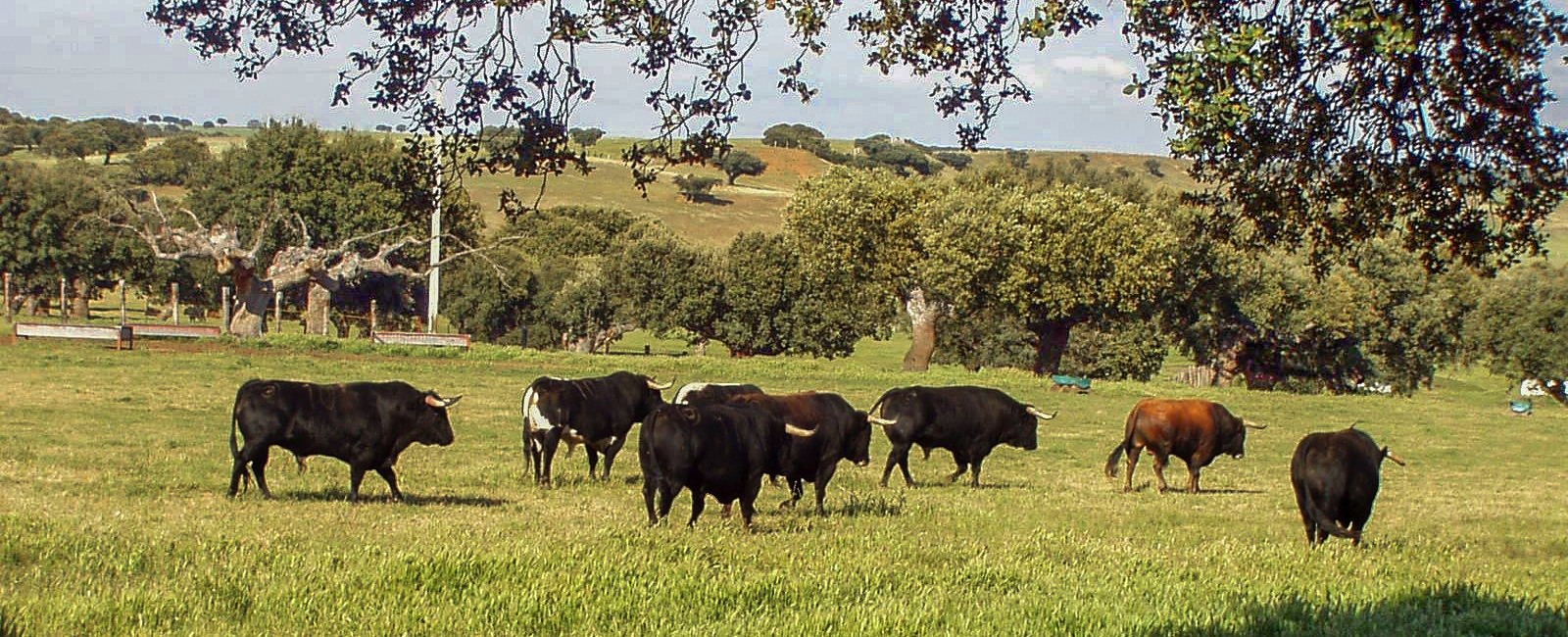
Breeding of Spanish fighting bulls near Salamanca

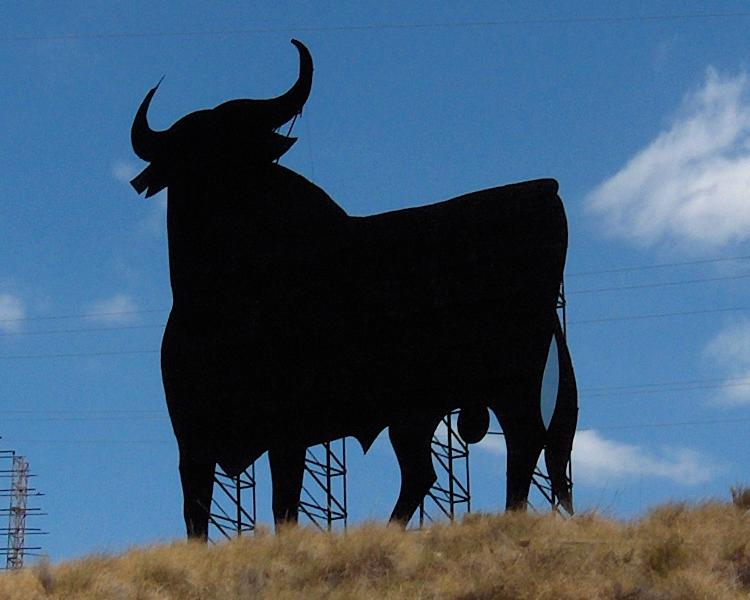
The fighting bull is considered a symbol of Spain as in this Osborne road advertisement.

Fighting cattle are bred on wide-ranging ranches in Spain's dehesas or in the Portuguese Montados, which are often havens for Iberian wildlife as the farming techniques used are extensive. Both male and female calves spend their first year of life with their mothers; then they are weaned, branded, and kept in single-sex groups. When the cattle reach maturity after two years or so, they are sent to the tienta, or testing.

For the males, this establishes if they are suitable for breeding, the bullfight, or slaughter for meat. The testing for the bullfight is only of their aggression towards the horse, as regulations forbid their charging a man on the ground before they enter the bullfighting ring. They learn how to use their horns in tests of strength and dominance with other bulls. Due to their special aggression, these combats can lead to severe injuries and even death of the bulls, at great cost to their breeders.

The females are more thoroughly tested, including by a bullfighter with his capes; hence a bull's "courage" is often said to descend from his mother.

If fit for bullfighting, bulls will return to their peers. Cows passing the tienta are kept for breeding and will be slaughtered only when they can bear no more calves.

At three years old males are no longer considered calves; they are known as novillos and are ready for bullfighting, although novilladas are for training bullfighters, or novilleros. The best bulls are kept for corridas de toros with full matadors. Under Spanish law they must be at least four years old and reach the weight of 460 kg to fight in a first-rank bullring, 435 kg for a second-rank one, and 410 kg for third-rank rings. They must also have fully functional vision and horns that are even (and have not been tampered with) and be in generally good condition.

A very few times each year a bull will be indultado, or "pardoned", meaning his life is spared due to outstanding behaviour in the bullring, leading the audience to petition the president of the ring with white handkerchiefs. The bullfighter joins the petition, as it is a great honour to have a bull one has fought pardoned. The president pardons the bull showing an orange handkerchief. The bull, if he survives his injuries, which are usually severe, is then returned to the ranch he was bred at, where he will live out his days in the fields. In most cases, he will become a "seed bull", mated once with some 30 cows. Four years later, his offspring will be tested in the ring. If they fight well, he may be bred again. An "indultado" bull's lifespan can be 20 to 25 years.

== Miura ==
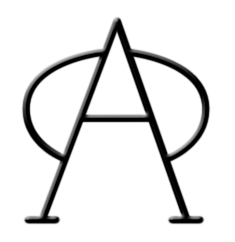
The brand of the Miura ranch

The Miura is a bloodline of Spanish Fighting Bull bred at the Ganadería Miura in the province of Seville, in Andalucia (37.59637°N 5.47804°W). The Miura derives from five historic lines of Spanish bull: the Gallardo, Cabrera, Navarra, Veragua, and Vistahermosa-Parladé; the line is known for producing large and difficult fighting bulls. A Miura bull debuted in Madrid on 30 April 1849.

The bulls were fought under the name of Juan Miura until his death in 1854. Then they were under the name of his widow, Josefa Fernández de Miura. After her death, the livestock bore the name of her eldest son Antonio Miura Fernández from 1869 to 1893 and then the younger brother, Eduardo Miura Fernández until his death in 1917.

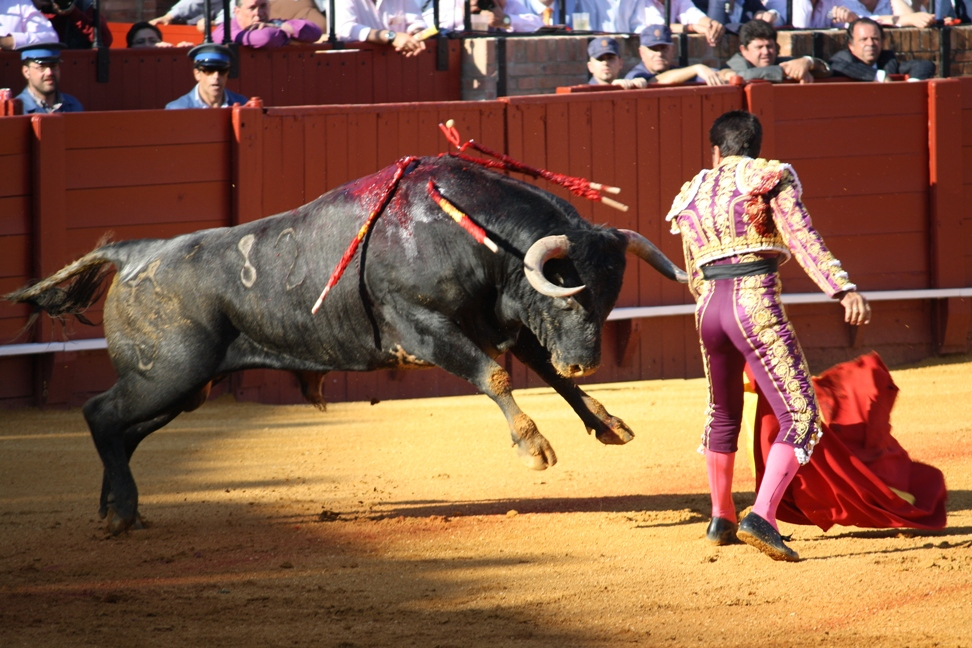
A Miura bull charges at matador El Fandi at the Seville bullring

Bulls from the Miura lineage have a reputation for being large, fierce, and cunning. It is said to be especially dangerous for a matador to turn his back on a Miura. Miura bulls have been referred to as individualists, each bull seemingly possessing a strong personal character.

In Death in the Afternoon, Ernest Hemingway wrote:

There are certain strains of bull with a marked ability to learn from what goes on in the arena ... faster than the actual fight progresses which makes it more difficult from one minute to the next to control them ... these bulls are raised by Don Eduardo Miura's sons from old fighting stock...

=== Famous bulls ===
- Murciélago survived 24 jabs with the lance from the picador in a fight on 5 October 1879, against Rafael "El Lagartijo" Molina Sánchez, at the Coso de los califas bullring in Córdoba, Spain.
- Islero gored and killed the bullfighter Manolete on 28 August 1947.

== Bibliography ==
- Villiers-Wardell, Janie (1914). Spain of the Spanish (Countries and Peoples Series). The University of California.
- Shubert, Adrian (2001). Death and money in the afternoon: a history of the Spanish bullfight (Illustrated ed.). Oxford University Press US. ISBN 978-0-19-514412-3.
- Grühsem, Stephan; Vann, Peter (2006). Lamborghini Today: A Tempo Furioso (Illustrated ed.). MotorBooks/MBI Publishing Company. ISBN 0-7603-2704-1.

== See also ==
- List of breeds of cattle
- Brava cattle
