= Muleta =

Stick with red cape attached, used in final third of a bullfight

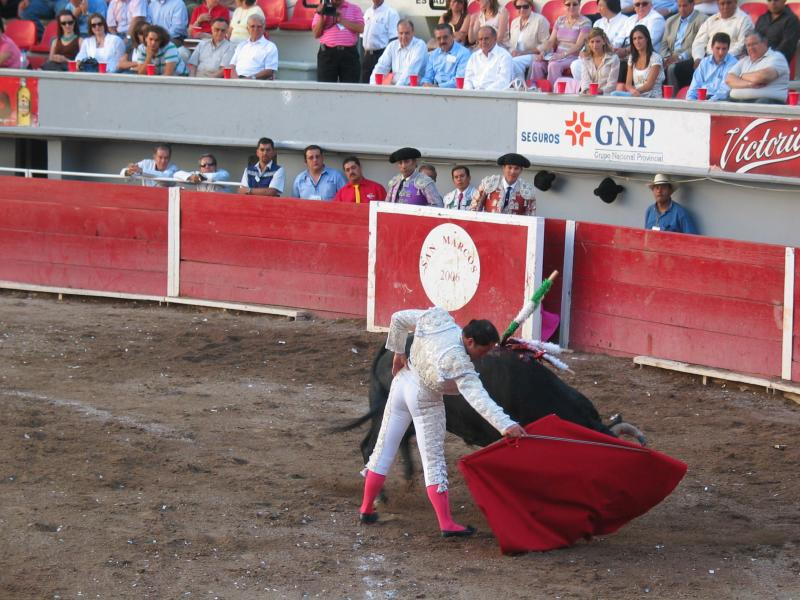
A bullfighter uses his muleta

A muleta is a stick with a red cloth hanging from it that is used in the final third (tercio de muleta or de muerte) of a bullfight. It is different from the cape used by the matador earlier in the fight (capote de brega).

The muleta obscures the sword; and as in his earlier work with the cape, the bullfighter uses it to attract the bull in a series of passes, thus demonstrating his control over it. The red color of the muleta is actually irrelevant to the bull since bulls are dichromatic (a type of colorblind), meaning neither the cape nor the muleta color can be accurately discerned by the bull. The color is retained merely for tradition, and to hide bloodstains that would become inevitable during a fight.

There are a number of distinct styles of pass, each with its own name. With the cape for instance, the verónica is a pass in which the matador slowly swings the cape away from the charging bull while keeping his feet in the same position. The faena is the final series of passes before the kill in which the matador uses the muleta to maneuver the bull into a position to stab it between its shoulders, cutting the aorta. If this fails, the matador must then cut the bull's spinal cord with a second sword, killing it instantly. The task of killing the bull is given to the matador alone; his title means literally "killer".
