= Las Ventas =

Bullring in Madrid, Spain

- Plaza de Toros de Las Ventas
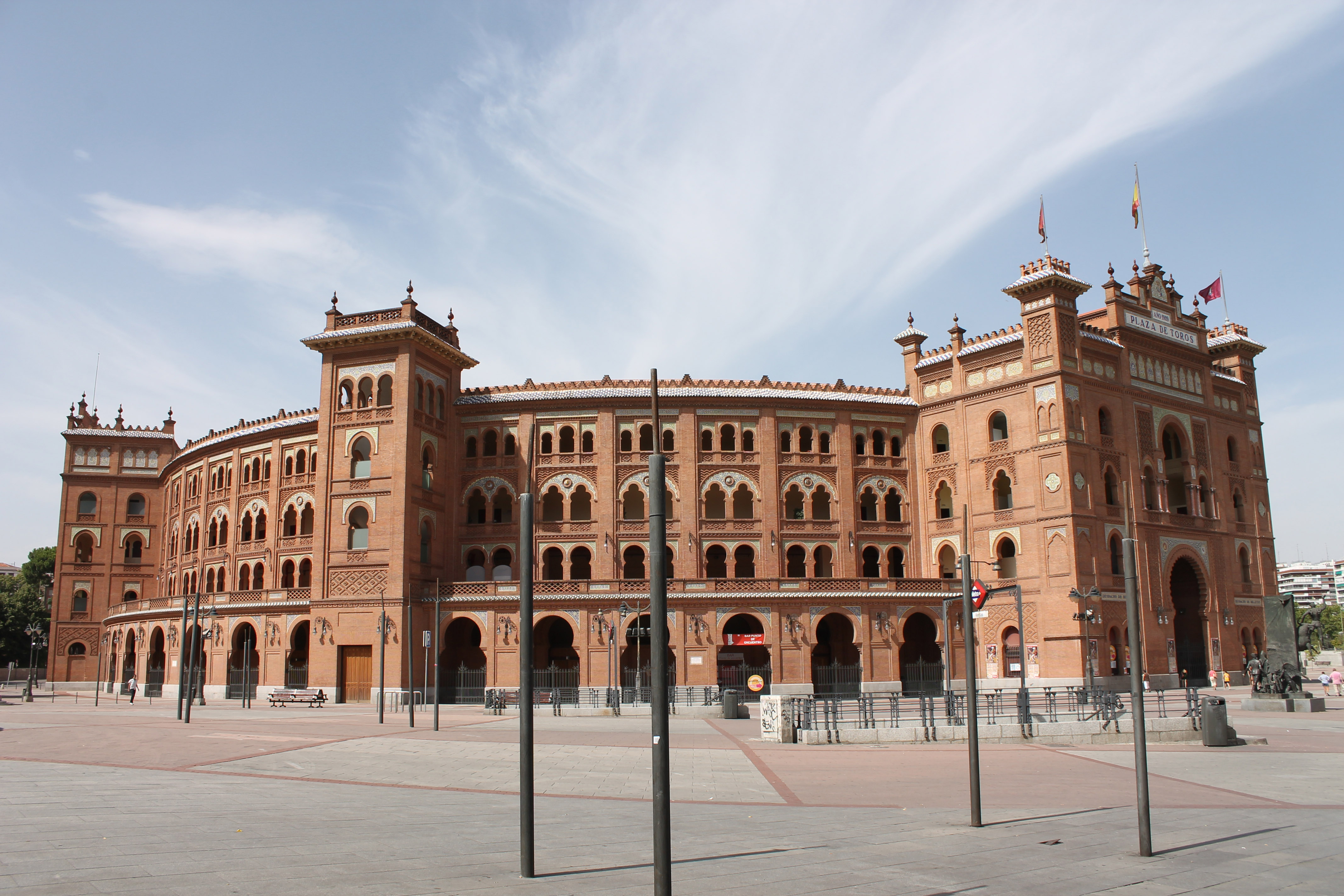
- Las Ventas bullring
- Interactive map of the Las Ventas area
- Former names: Las Ventas del Espíritu Santo

General information
- Type: Bullring
- Architectural style: Neo-Mudéjar
- Location: c/ Alcalá, 237; 28028 Madrid, Madrid, Spain
- Coordinates: 40°25′55.5″N 3°39′47.8″W
- Current tenants: Plaza 1
- Inaugurated: June 17, 1931; 95 years ago
- Owner: Comunidad de Madrid

Design and construction
- Architect: José Espeliu

Other information
- Seating capacity: 23,798

Website
- www.las-ventas.com
- Location within Spain

Spanish Cultural Heritage
- Official name: Plaza de Toros de Las Ventas
- Type: Non-movable
- Criteria: Monument
- Designated: 1994
- Reference no.: RI-51-0008990

The Plaza de Toros de Las Ventas, known simply as Las Ventas [laz ˈβentas], is the largest bullfighting ring in Spain, located in the Guindalera quarter of the Salamanca district of Madrid. It was inaugurated on June 17, 1931. Its seating capacity of 23,798, makes it the third-largest bullfighting ring in the world, after bullrings in Mexico and Venezuela. After the federal ban of bullfighting in Plaza México, Las Ventas is the second largest bullring in the world still in operation for its original intention.

This bullring was designed by the architect José Espeliú in the Neo-Mudéjar (Moorish) style with ceramic incrustations. The seats are situated in ten "tendidos". The price of the seats depends upon how close they are to the arena and whether they are in the sun or the shade (the latter being more expensive). The bullfighting season starts in March and ends in October; bullfights are held every day during the San Isidro Fiesta, and every Sunday or holiday during the season. Bullfights start at 6 or 7pm and last for two to three hours.

== History ==
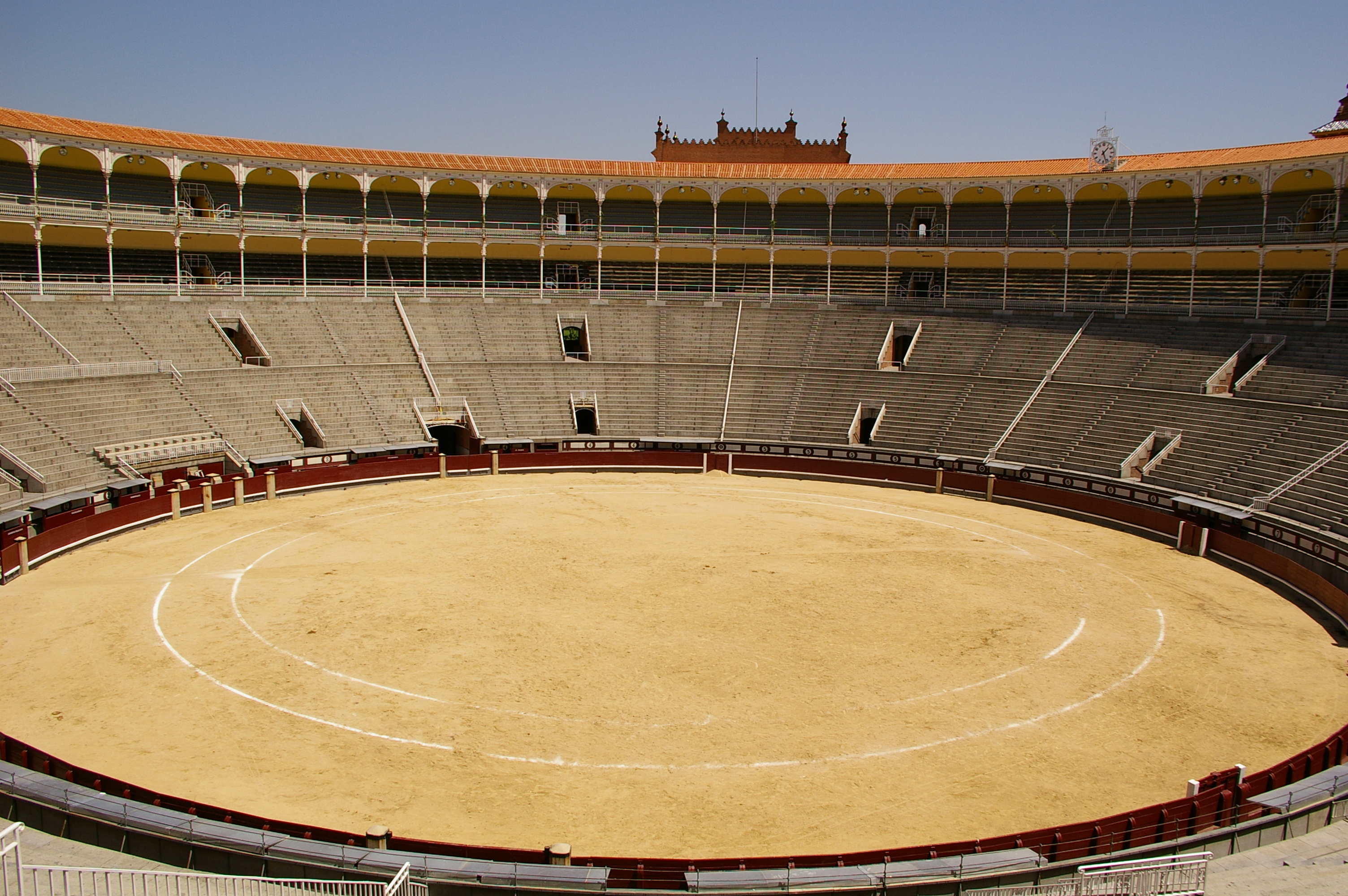
View of the empty arena of Las Ventas. It is about 65 meters in diameter, one of the world's widest rings.

From 1913 to 1920, bullfighting gained such a momentum that Madrid's former main bullring of Fuente del Berro was not big enough. It was José Gómez Ortega "Joselito" who complained about the necessity of a new "monumental" bullring, to open this part of Spain's heritage and culture to the whole city of Madrid. Architect José Espeliú (friend of Joselito) began to work on the project.

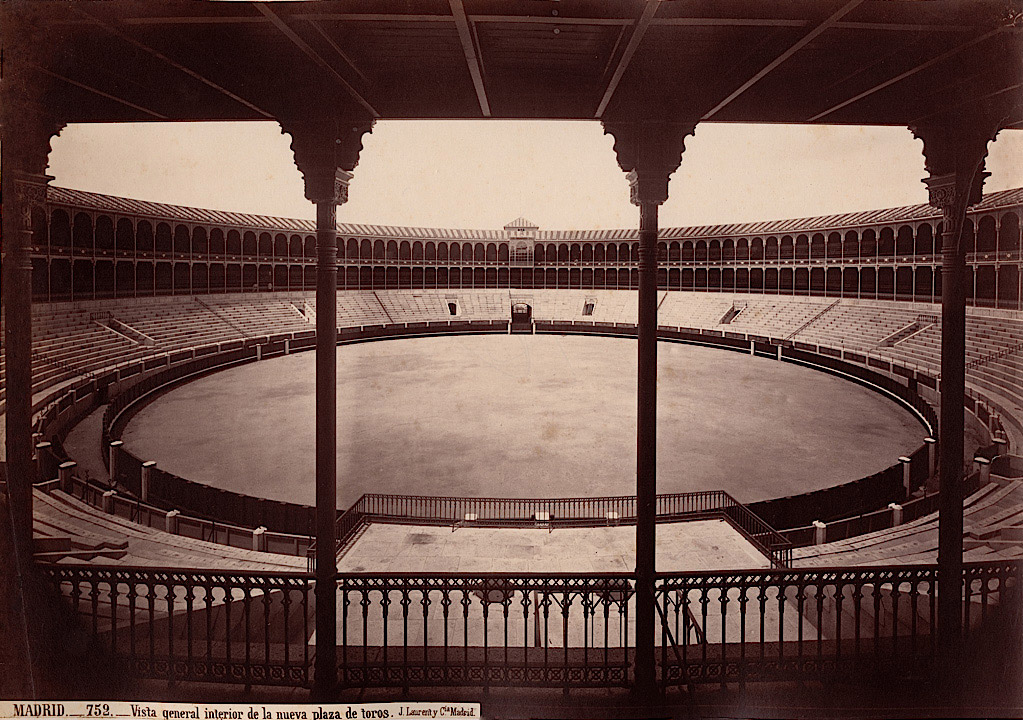
Interior view of the bullring of Fuente del Berro, Madrid, in 1874. Photography by J. Laurent. Copying albumin. Biblioteca Nacional de España.

A family called Jardón donated the land to the Madrid Provincial Council, provided that they could run the arena for fifty years. The deputation accepted the proposal on November 12, 1920. On March 19, 1922, in the exact center of the prospective arena, the first stone was placed. The construction of the bullring would cost 12 million pesetas (4.5 million over budget), and it would replace the old bullring, dating from 1874.

"Las Ventas" was finished in 1929 and two years later, June 17, 1931, a charity bullfight was held with a full-capacity crowd to inaugurate it. Bullfighting stopped during the Spanish Civil War and did not resume until May 1939.

The bullring was used as a Francoist concentration camp.

There is a Pasodoble called 'Plaza de las Ventas' and the composer Maestro Manuel Lillo dedicated to this arena.

== Structure and facilities ==
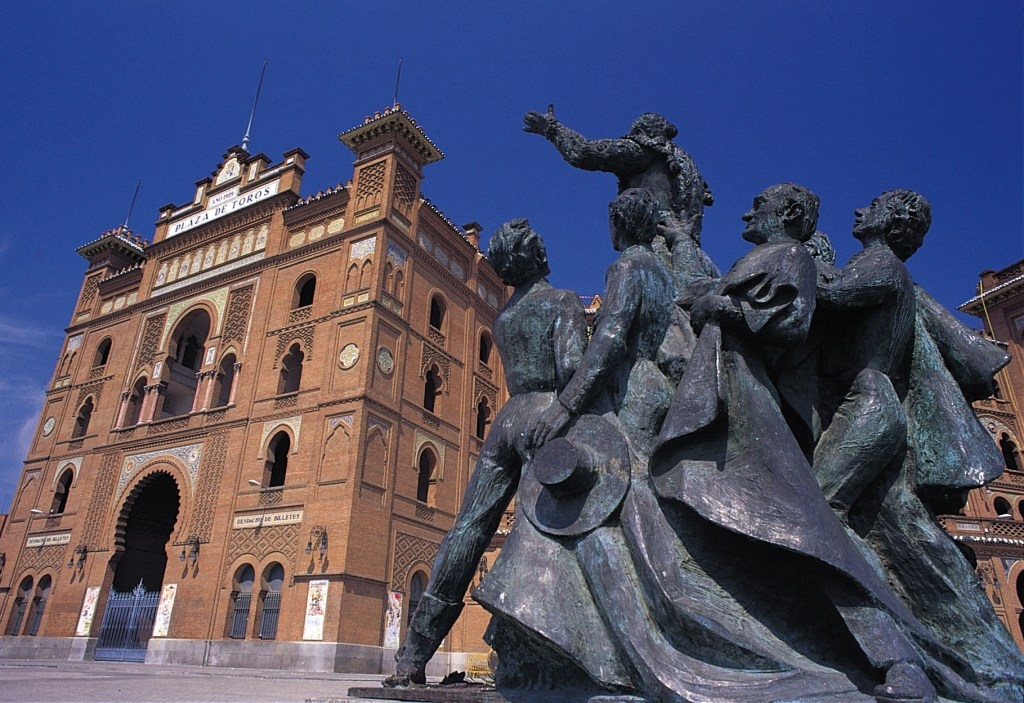
View of the Neo-Mudéjar façade and a neighbouring sculpture by Luis Sanguino.

"Las Ventas" is divided into a ring or arena, and a group of zones called "patios". Its architecture is Neo-Mudéjar, with ceramic representations of the arms of the different Spanish provinces. The arena has a diameter of 60 meters. The seating capacity is divided into 10 "tendidos" (group of 27 rows around the arena), some of them in the shade and the rest in the sun.

The president of the 'corrida' sits in the 10th Tendido. The Royal Box is of outstanding design, with its Mudéjar architecture, a complete bathroom and a lift. Opposite to the Royal Box, in the covered grandstand roof, is the clock. The bullring has five gates, plus three more called "toriles", from where the bulls enter the arena. The gate of the "cuadrillas", between "tendidos" 3 and 4, has access to the horse yard. Inside this door, the "paseíllo" starts and the "picadores" (those who pierce the bull with the lance) come out from here to the arena ("suerte de varas"). The dragging gate, that leads to the skinning room, is between "tendidos" 1 and 2. The famous "Puerta Grande" (Big Gate), also called the Gate of Madrid, is between "tendidos" 7 and 8. Going out through this door, especially during the Fiesta of San Isidro, is every bullfighter's ambition.

There are also a chapel and a small infirmary with two operating rooms.

== Other uses ==
=== Cultural visits ===
Las Ventas bullring is open all year for cultural visits under the name of Las Ventas Tour. The tour includes an audioguide translated into 10 languages and the visit to the bullring and its bullfighting museum.

=== Concerts ===
The Beatles performed here on July 2, 1965. In 1991, Diana Ross performed at Las Ventas for her Here and Now World Tour 1991-92. On July 15, 1993 Depeche Mode performed here during their Devotional Tour. During 1996, Australian rock band AC/DC performed at the bullring for their Ballbreaker World Tour, recording the performance for their concert video, No Bull. In the summer of 2003, Radiohead played a concert at Las Ventas, their only stop in Spain that year. In 2009, Kylie Minogue performed there as part of her KylieX2008 tour, and on October 28, 2011, Coldplay performed at Las Ventas during the American Express Unstaged music series.

=== Red Bull X Fighters ===
The venue has also hosted the Red Bull X Fighters FMX since 2002.

=== Tennis ===
In 2008, the arena was converted into a tennis clay court and the Spanish Davis Cup Team, led by Rafael Nadal, played their semifinal against the United States, and won it in front of their home crowd.

=== Theatre ===
Since 2014, the venue can be set up as a theatre, under the name Gran Teatro Ruedo Las Ventas, with a capacity of 858 seats.

== See also ==
- Spain Davis Cup team
- List of tennis stadiums by capacity
