= List of banks in Gibraltar =

The following is a list of licensed banks currently operating in the British overseas territory of Gibraltar.

== List ==
- Turicum Private Bank Limited
- Bank Jacob Safra (Gibraltar).
- Gibraltar International Bank
- Gibraltar Savings Bank
- Trusted Novus Bank Gibraltar
- IDT Financial Services Limited trading as IDT Finance
- The Royal Bank of Scotland International trading as NatWest International
- SG Hambros Bank (Gibraltar) Limited
- Xapo Bank
- Moneycorp Bank

== Banks no longer established in Gibraltar ==
- Banco Galliano
- Gibraltar Trust Bank - est. 1987 as a joint venture with Credit Suisse. In 1991 Credit Suisse wholly acquired Gibraltar Trust, which is now Credit Suisse (Gibraltar)
- Barclays Bank PLC; The Anglo-Egyptian Bank (later Barclays) opened a branch in Gibraltar in 1888, and withdrew from the Rock in 2015.
- Lloyds, closed in late 2019.
- Newcastle Building Society, now closed
- Norwich & Peterborough Building Society, has now closed
- Credit Suisse (Gibraltar) Limited has now closed its operations
- Leeds Building Society has now closed its operations (2019)
- Jyske Bank has closed

Between 1900 and 1940 there were also four small, family-owned banks:

- Cuby Brothers
- Benzecry (El Banquerito)
- Rugeroni Brothers
- Marrache and Sons

== See also ==
- List of banks in Europe
