= Luis Sanguino =

Spanish sculptor (1934–2026)

- Born: Luis Antonio Sanguino de Pascual; 13 August 1934; Barcelona, Spain
- Died: 12 July 2026 (aged 91); Segovia, Spain
- Occupation: Sculptor
- Years active: 1942–2026
- Spouse(s): Dana Woodward, Curra Álvarez
- Children: Luis Russel, Jordi, Triana Cristina (by Woodward); Curro, Rocío (by Álvarez)
- Parents: Aquilino Sanguino (father); Rosa de Pascual (mother)

Luis Antonio Sanguino de Pascual (Spanish: [ˈlwis anˈtonjo saŋˈɡino ðe pasˈkwal]; 13 August 1934 – 12 July 2026) was a Spanish sculptor who is known for many monumental works, mostly in bronze, both in Spain and in the Americas. After living abroad more than once, including sojourns in other European countries as a child, arising from the Spanish Civil War's upheavals, and periods during his adult life in the United States and Mexico, he later lived near Segovia in the land of his birth.

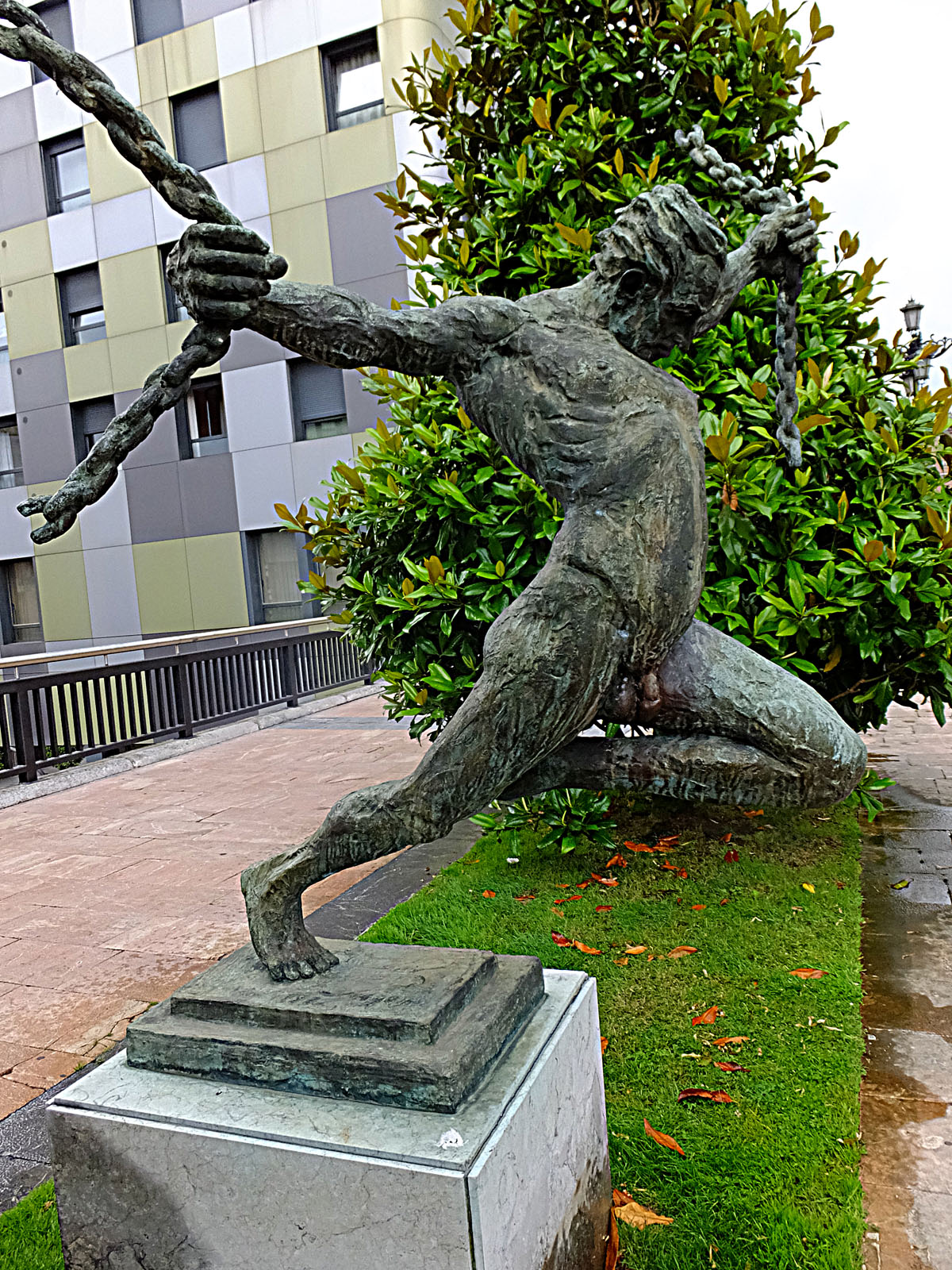
Libertad ("Freedom"), one of Sanguino's works on public display in Oviedo.

== Early life ==
Sanguino's parents, the lawyer Aquilino Sanguino and Rosa de Pascual, were a noble family of Barcelona, while their son was the seventh of eight siblings. When the Spanish Civil War broke out in 1936, they fled Barcelona, leaving behind all their belongings in their rush to take flight.

Their journey both outside and inside the country led to them living in Marseille, Monaco and San Sebastián, but in the end they settled in the Andalusian province of Córdoba, where Sanguino would live his childhood on a farm called La Raña, and he would study at the Salesian college of Pozoblanco.

From earliest childhood, Sanguino showed signs of great artistic gifts. During the Civil War, when his once comfortable family had to use many candles for lack of any better lighting, he took advantage of the melted wax from them to make little sculptures. His skills improved, and he accomplished at the age of only eight a work in terracotta, known as "Las Ruinas", dated between 1942 and 1943. It was made up of a bas-relief in baked clay (terracotta) that depicts a bucolic or pastoral countryside scene in which one sees a shepherd with his flock in the middle of nature, and before the ruins of what must once have been a monastery. In executing this work, Sanguino was inspired by an engraving from an old book that his mother had.

Sanguino's family moved house in 1944, relocating this time to Spain's capital, Madrid, where they would only live for a short time before moving once again, this time to Cádiz. It was during his short time in Madrid, however, that Sanguino's acquaintances put him in touch with the sculptor Mariano Benlliure, who despite considering Sanguino's aptitude in sculpture to be quite great, would not become his teacher owing to his already advanced age (Benlliure was 82 by this time), and instead recommended that fellow sculptor Federico Coullaut-Valera Mendigutia take on the task. Coullaut-Valera's father had also been a sculptor, Lorenzo Coullaut Valera (1876–1932), who had created, among other works, the sculpture "El Quijote", a work representing Don Quijote and Sancho Panza from the well known Spanish epic novel astride their mounts. It stands at the Plaza de España in Madrid as part of the Monument to Miguel de Cervantes.

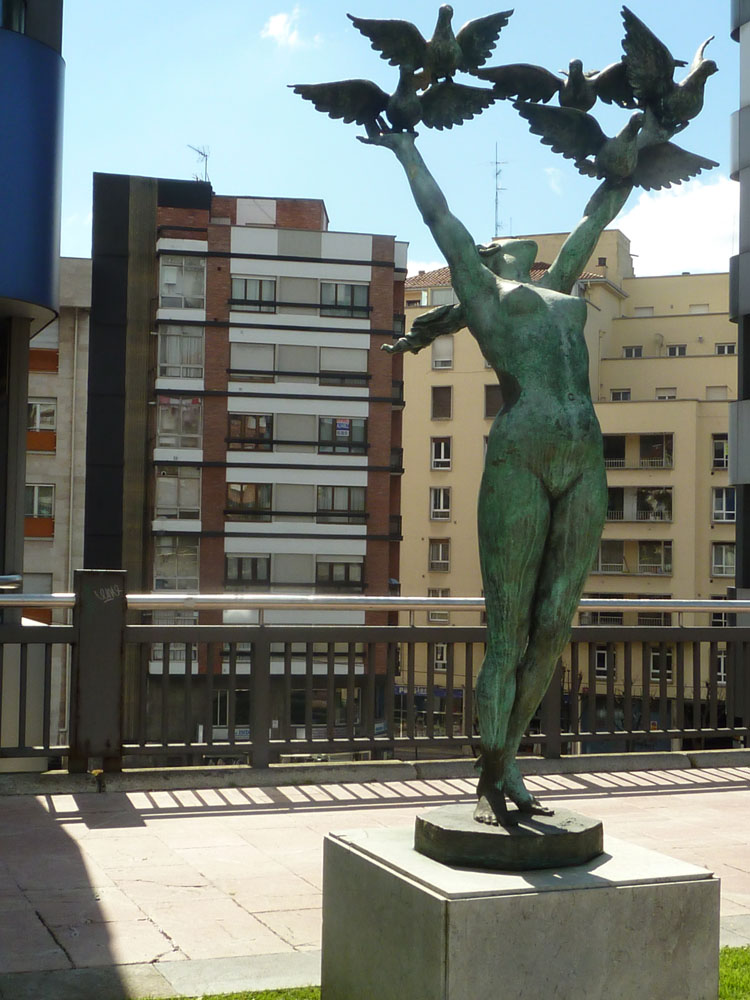
Paz ("Peace"), another of Sanguino's works on public display in Oviedo.

== Artistic career ==
Sanguino presented himself at his first plasterers' contest, which was being held in Cádiz, becoming a finalist (the work that he displayed was entitled "La perezosa", or "The Lazy Woman", made of plaster and one metre in height, and depicted a female figure), subsequently taking part in a further contest in Seville. There his work consisted of an execution of a decorative moulding one metre in height with flower and tear motifs, among other decorative elements. Even given the work's quality, however, he did not win a prize, although he did get chosen to participate in yet another contest, this one to be held in Madrid. This time, he won first prize at the residential college ("Colegio Mayor") "La Paloma", which could be considered the working-class university at that time. It was decided that Sanguino should move to Madrid, where he had already held exhibitions in December 1947 at the "Kebos" art salons, so that he could undertake his studies at Federico Coullaut-Valera Mendigutia's side.

His beginnings as a sculptor were not easy and he gave himself over to making little works to sell so that he could earn a living and at the same time continue his studies. He thus realized in polychrome plaster "Portales de Belén" ("Gates of Bethlehem") which he sold at the Plaza Mayor in Madrid, coming to establish a small industry in which his siblings collaborated. To earn money, he also made small sculptures from baked clay, but instead of selling them, he would himself go to pawnshops and pawn them there. Nevertheless, he rented a small studio on the Calle de la Luna (a narrow lane off the Calle de San Bernardo), a street where other already established artists lived, like the painter Enrique Navarro, Miguel Herrero, José Luis Mazuelos and Demetrio Salgado.

Besides helping his teacher Coullaut-Valera, Sanguino worked for an antiquarian, Arturo Linares, a member of the Cortes Españolas (Francoist Spain's legislature), making statues of saints for him. The antiquarian would size old timbers, while Sanguino would carve and polychrome them, and then put them in the kiln. The resulting works looked thoroughly authentic. He made roughly 17 of these sculptures, whose heights were each between 50 and 60 centimetres, which were meant to simulate works by the great masters of the Spanish Golden Age: Alonso Cano, Gregorio Fernández and other great realist visual artists in Spanish Baroque sculpture.

Motivated by his teacher, Coullaut-Valera, Sanguino presented himself as a sculptor at the contest for the "Valley of the Fallen", submitting a number of draft works on the armed forces of the land, sea and air, and militias; at this time, he was 18 years old. Sanguino's drafts consisted of the following: three in plaster one metre tall, a sculpture measuring 1.75 m, a hand worked in stone (for he wished to show his ability at carving stone), and several drawings. He was chosen to execute the work, although at the time, he found himself having to do the then obligatory military service.

The works for the construction of the "Valley of the Fallen" Basilica (San Lorenzo de El Escorial, Community of Madrid) were begun in 1942, with Director General of Architecture Pedro Muguruza being put in charge of the project. He, however, gave it up in 1949 owing to advanced degenerative paralysis. The project's direction then shifted to Diego Méndez González, who at once set about simplifying parts of the work (for example, Coullaut-Valera's project for a Way of the Cross vanished from the plans). The sculptures that alluded to the armed forces were Sanguino's.

The Armed Forces monument is made up of eight sculptures, each three metres tall, carved in granite with angular, big, flat and stark shapes (which contrast with the polished look seen in the faces and arms), which fit perfectly into the whole complex, which itself is distinguished in its architectural character. It is found on the upper parts of both the walls of the Basilica's nave, which is structurally a crypt (it is underground), symbolizing at once the watch and the grief (representing the theme of a man being half monk and half soldier, and at the same time referring and paying homage to the armed forces: army, navy, air force and militias), before the remains of those who lie within. It took three years to make these sculptures., and Sanguino himself said that he was paid well for his work.

It was at the time when Sanguino and other sculptors were working on models for the project in a room at the Palacio de Oriente (as it was then known) that he actually met Francisco Franco, who came to see them while attending a credentials ceremony. Nobody was brave enough to speak to him. Sanguino said of him "He was a very short man, but he impressed."

=== Move to the United States ===
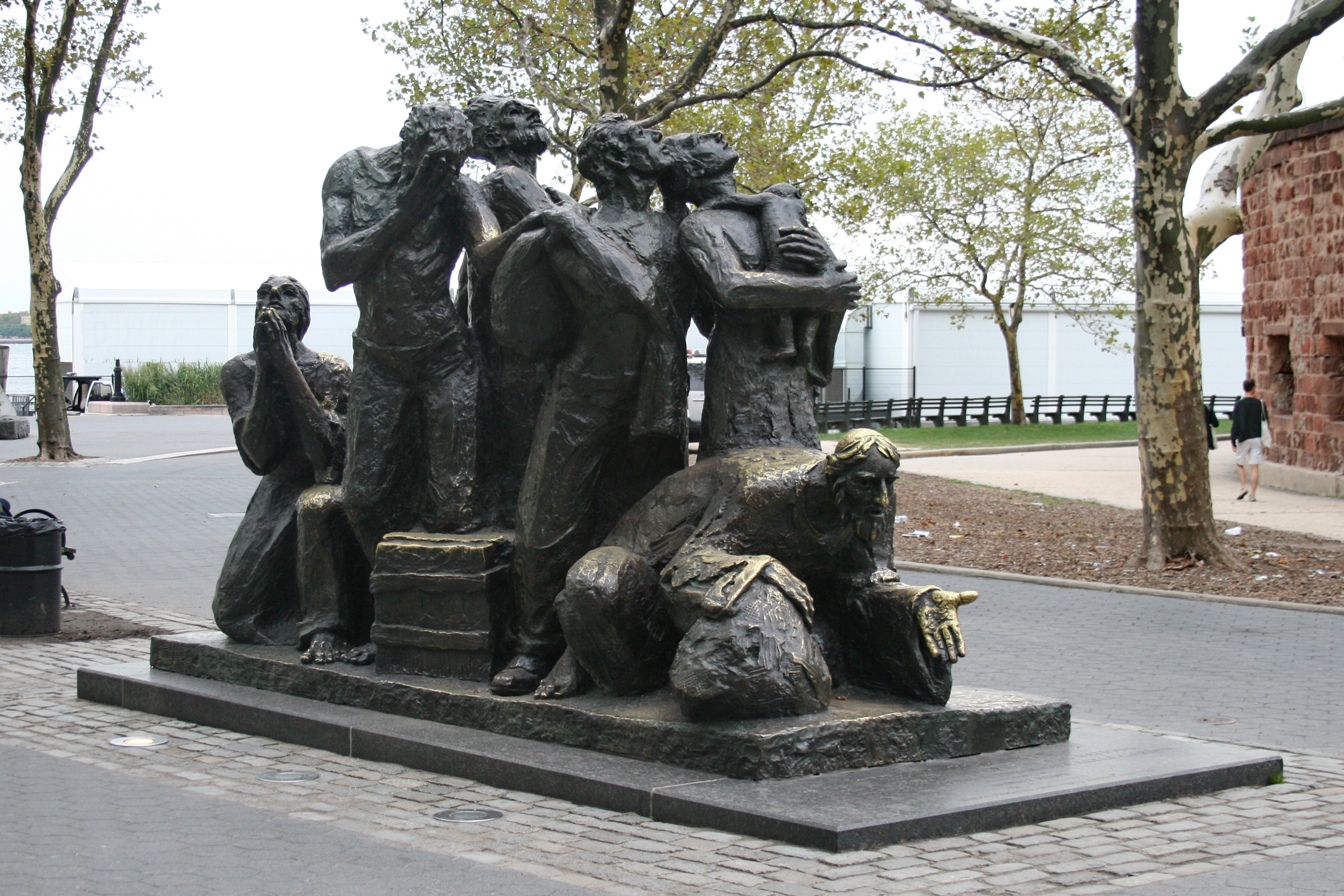
"The Immigrants" at Battery Park in New York, 1975

In 1957, Sanguino wed the American Dana Woodward, with whom he had his first three children Luis Russel, Jordi and Triana Cristina. At this time in his life, he took up residence with his family in the state of New York. Sanguino had arrived in the United States with nothing more than some photographs of some of his works in the Valley of the Fallen, but then nevertheless began a most fruitful stage in his artistic career; he kept making monumental works, ones worthy of drawing attention from the National Sculpture Society of New York, who called him "a classic of the 20th century". It was also in this time that Sanguino got to know Salvador Dalí and many other artists, thus becoming the youngest ever member chosen to be in this association. His acquaintance with Dalí began one weekend morning when the surrealist painter called him on the telephone, saying that somebody had given him Sanguino's references as a sculptor with some impact. At first, Sanguino did not believe that it really was Dalí.

Living in New York was useful to Sanguino for knowing and studying works by great artists such as the Italian painter and sculptor Amedeo Modigliani (1884–1920), Constantin Brâncuși (1876–1957) and Auguste Rodin (1840–1917), and he characterized his first American stage as a seeking phase, which is reflected in works from this time.

In the United States, Sanguino exhibited at various venues, foremost among which were Hammer Galleries of New York and the Palm Beach Gallery in Florida.

Sanguino did not stop taking part in contests, whether organized in Spain (like the one held by Málaga city council, whose objective was a monument to Francisco Franco, at which he won over, with his draft works, sculptors like Juan de Ávalos and Santiago de Santiago, although in the end, he did not come out on top) or in the United States.

Even though Sanguino lived in the United States, in 1967 he bought a farm in Mataelpino, a village lying in El Boalo municipality in the Sierra de Guadarrama, which allowed him to alternate living and working between Spain and New York. Thus, in 1970 he realized an important exhibition at the Grifé&Escoda gallery, this being his first exhibition in Spain.

=== First return to Spain ===
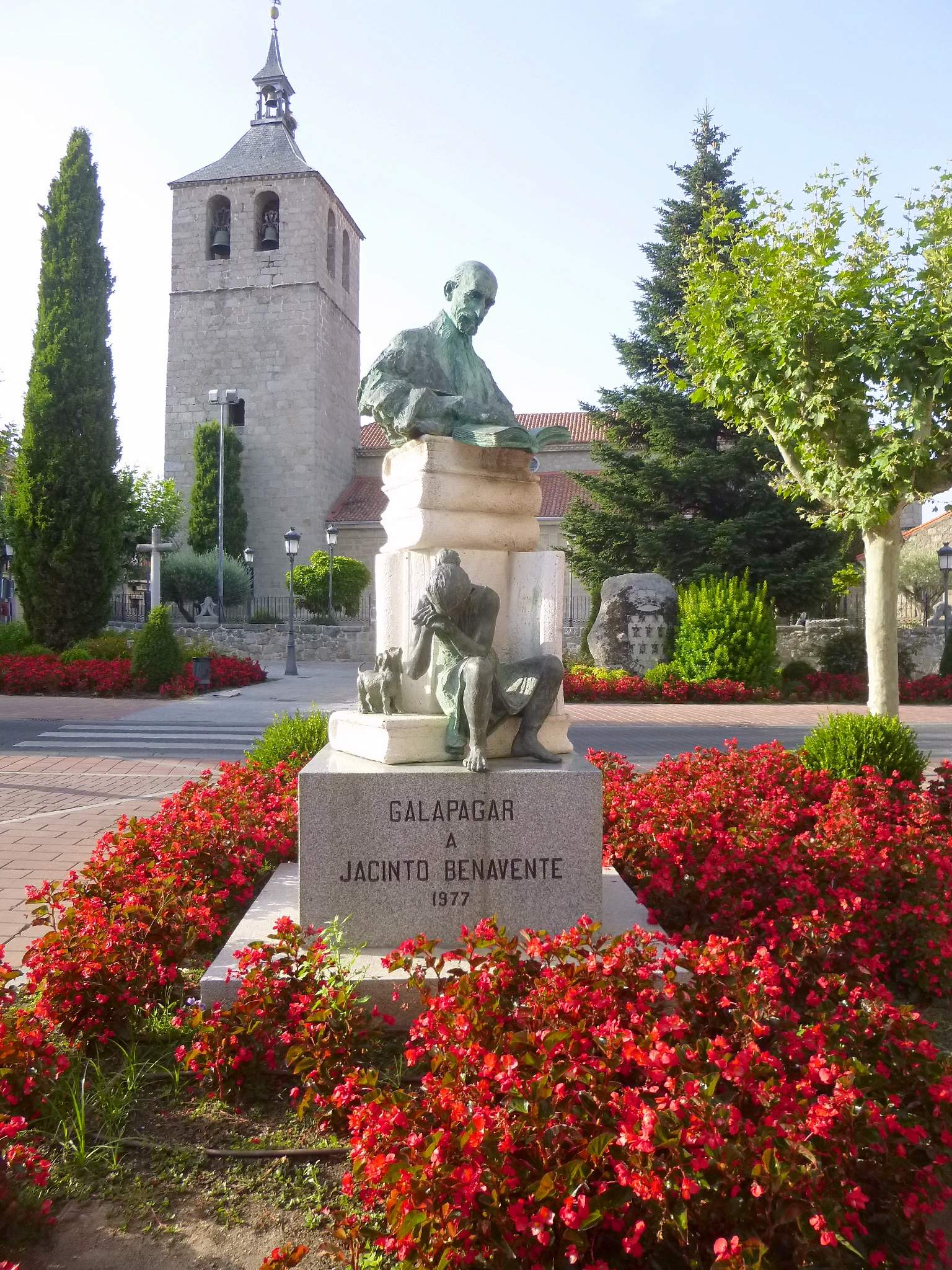
"Monumento a Jacinto Benavente", Galapagar, 1977

Sanguino returned to Spain to live in the land of his birth in 1976 (albeit not definitively), then receiving the Cross of the Order of Isabella the Catholic from His Majesty King Juan Carlos I, for representing and feeling proud of his country wherever he was. This remained obvious in his struggle to get 12 October, traditionally and to this day marked in the United States as Columbus Day, "Day of the Italians", declared "Hispanicity Day" ("día de la Hispanidad") since, according to Sanguino, Columbus, even though it is believed that he was Genoese (although it has never been proved that he was), went on a Spanish expedition, and therefore he should be celebrated with a day called Día de la Raza or Día de la Hispanidad, which is indeed now celebrated in many of the world's countries each year on 12 October. Meeting with a few Spanish friends, he and they together stressed that this day was to be observed as a homage to Spain, and for this they decided at the Commodore Hotel (now called the Hyatt Grand Central New York) adjoining Grand Central Terminal in New York to give a kind of dinner for some 300 people. The event was rather more successful than expected, with more than one thousand people showing up, among whom were some of that time's more prominent figures, including New York's mayor John Lindsay and Spain's ambassador to the United States, at that time the Count of Motrico, José María de Areilza. This led to there being a big parade the next year on Fifth Avenue in honour of Spanish Day. Because Sanguino was one of the movement's main promoters, some, among them a few ambassadors and consuls, proposed that he receive the medal. In the end, it was indeed conferred upon him, even as Francisco Franco still lived. Nevertheless, it was not until 1976 that Sanguino received it from the King of Spain.

=== Move to Mexico ===
In 1978, Sanguino once again moved, making his new home this time in Mexico, there leaving a great mark with his works and beginning a new artistic stage in which he accentuated his sculptures' classicism. In 1979 he wed a young woman from Segovia, Curra Álvarez, mother to his two youngest children, Curro and Rocío. He lived with them in Mexico for thirteen years.

As Sanguino punctuated his living in Mexico with frequent holidays in Spain, in late 1985 he bought a 14th-century Castilian keep in the Segovian locality of Valdeprados. Meanwhile, he continued to execute works on both sides of the Atlantic.

=== Second return to Spain ===
Sanguino returned to Spain in 1990, this time for good, making his home near Segovia, where he lived and worked until his death.

After Sanguino's return to Spain, Madrid became his patron, commissioning the artist with its most important and representative projects, although other cities such as Segovia, Guadalajara, Marbella, Oviedo and Navalcarnero also commissioned important projects from him.

In 2017, Sanguino's workshop at the mediaeval Valdeprados property contained a great bust of former prime minister Adolfo Suárez, which Sanguino was hoping one day to have put on display at the airport at Barajas, now that it bore Suárez's name.

Even though he was now a long way from the New World, it did not stop him working on projects for Mexico and Puerto Rico.

==== Sanguino's keep ====
The keep – or as it is popularly styled, castle – in Valdeprados that Sanguino bought in the 1970s has an illustrious history, having once been a royal inn where Queen Isabella sometimes spent the night on her journeys across the Province of Segovia. It was once held by a nobleman known as the Conde Puñoenrostro ("Count Fist-in-face" — there is a story about the noble house's name). It nowadays houses Sanguino's private collection, which comprises not only his own works, but others by Joaquín Sorolla, Marià Fortuny and Jan de Ruth, among many others. The castle's appointments include a habitable four-storey tower, a throne room, hearths, Gothic windows with their original Romanesque capitals, a great porticoed two-storey hall, gardens and a swimming pool surrounded by sculptures. At the back in the castle's main wing is Sanguino's studio, which has a six-metre-high vaulted ceiling and a hearth that is used for fires. Off the studio is a small apartment with a full bathroom and a loft library, and even a vaulted bedroom with a broad balcony. The main building (there are three outbuildings) has a floor area of some 1850 m^{2}. The castle is continually being restored, and stands 19 km from Segovia itself, in the small municipality of Valdeprados in the province of Segovia and afforded the artist the peace and quiet that he needed for creating his art, but at the same time is near enough to modern facilities that he and his wife also needed for everyday living.

One story – considered legend rather than history – has it that the counts with the unusual name came into ownership of the castle in King Henry IV's time when the king found himself having to fight a duel. The count at the time gallantly offered to take the king's place in the duel and fight it for him. The count apparently won, and he was thanked by the king by being awarded all the land that the count's horse could cover until the animal exhausted himself.

== Death ==
Sanguino died on 12 July 2026, at the age of 91.

== Style ==
Luis Sanguino's style emerged gradually as he increased his studies in plastic and artistic areas, perfecting sculptural techniques such as woodcarving, stone carving, modelling, etc. His artistic education was carried out in different workshops and with various teachers, from Antonio the potter in his childhood hometown Pozoblanco to Federico Coullaut-Valera in Madrid.

Sanguino said this of his own work and how he saw his art:

I am a sculptor and what I make is sculptures, not statues. The statue is a static and cold thing. People neither live by them, nor do they express anything. I believe that we sculptors mark part of history. Our work is long-lasting documents. After centuries, sculptures have been found underground and thanks to them, we know what Pilate, Nero, Seneca and many people were like.

== Artistic activity ==
=== Urban and institutional sculpture ===
- 1959 – Sculpture decoration on façade of Toys Guidance Council company headquarters on Broadway, New York. It is a series of sculptures in artificial stone of children playing different, typical and universal games like skipping rope, and sack racing, etc.
- Undated – Statue to decorate the lobby of a new treatment centre opposite New York's Memorial Sloan Kettering Cancer Center, commissioned by Messrs. Laurance Rockefeller and William Hutton, who had attended one of Sanguino's exhibitions and known his work in marble. The work consisted of a family: mother, father and son together, a symbol of man's struggle for family, executed in red marble from Alicante.

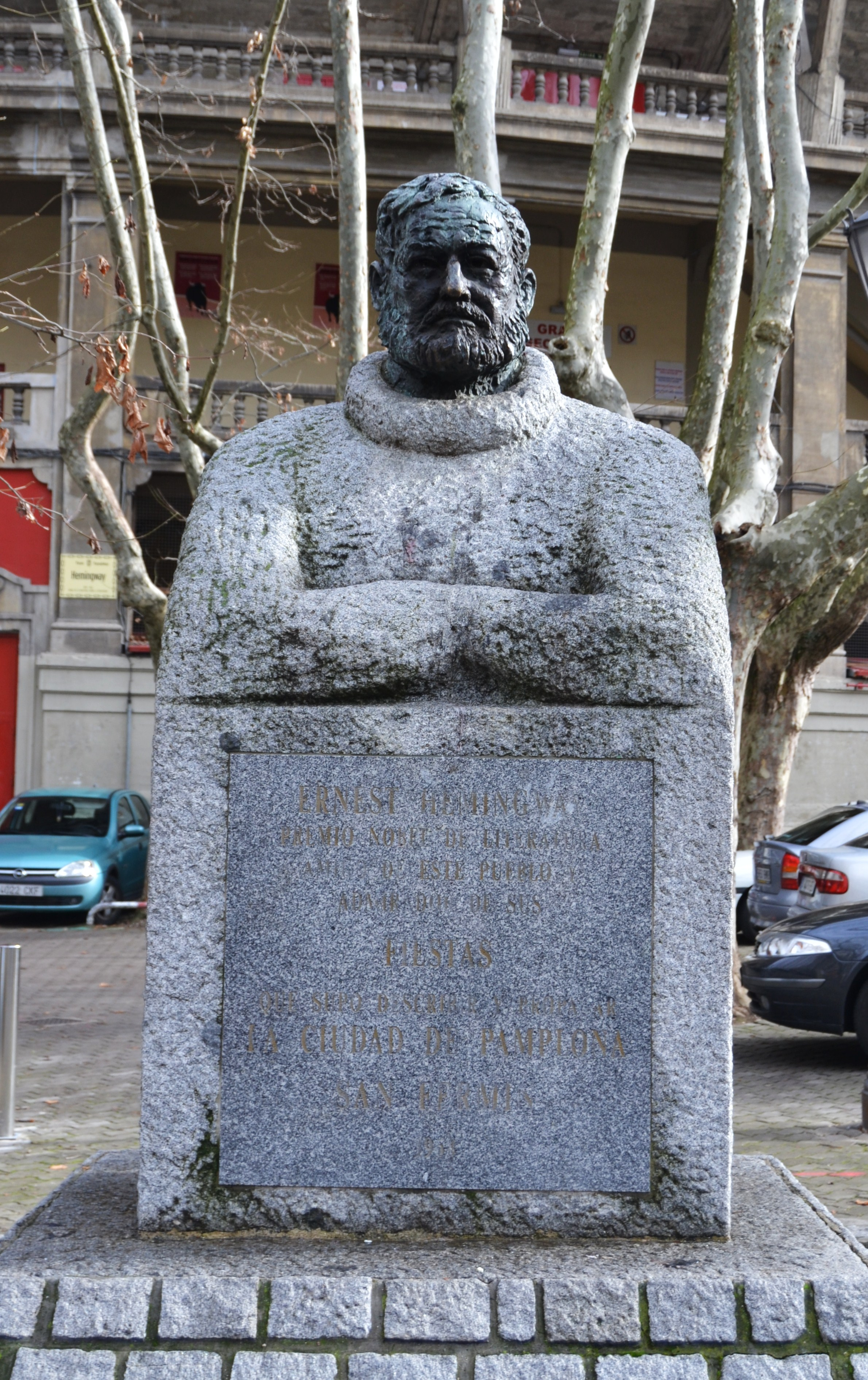
Ernest Hemingway Monument, Pamplona, 1968

- 1968 – "Monument to Ernest Hemingway", Pamplona. This is a great bronze bust, with the shoulders and base in granite. The bust was executed in New York and was then brought to Spain. For Hemingway's face, Sanguino worked from photographs provided by the writer's widow, Mary. The work stands on a street named after Hemingway.
- 1971 – "The Kiss", a work on display in the entrance to 345 Park Avenue, New York realized for an important real estate developer from this city, Samuel Rudin, in red marble from Alicante.
- Undated – Different sculptures commissioned by the builder Samuel Rudin such as: "The Future"; sited in the lobby of the building at 845 Third Avenue, part of which was later rented for the Embassy of the United Nations and for the British Consulate. It is a work in bronze that consists of a set formed of the Earth with a nude man emerging therefrom, whose raised hand touches the Moon, which is joined to the whole by some orbits.
- Undated – "Monument to New York", for 110 Wall Street. It is a kind of bridge with several people crossing it, each representing a different sector: the worker, industry; the teacher, culture; the child, family values and the future. Thus, they are the human beings who make cities.
- 1975 – "The Immigrants", in Battery Park, New York, bronze work with hardly any granite pedestal, sited at the end of the street at the same height as the passerby. The whole, formed by a total of eight figures among which can be seen a persecuted Jew in old Europe, a mother and father with a child, a man in rags, an African slave with his chains already broken, is held to represent the moment when these people came out of Castle Clinton to enter America, the Land of Opportunity, bringing along with them all their illusions and hopes for a new and better life. It was executed in Spain, and was once again one of Samuel Rudin's commissions. His parents had been immigrants from Belarus, and he wished to remember his father, Louis Rudinsky (who shortened his name), and all immigrants to the United States.
- 1975 – "Monumento al matador de toros Juan Montero Navarro", Albacete Cemetery, commissioned by his kin. The monument is a sculptural set of a bullfighter giving an Espaldina Monterina, a pass invented by him and typical of his fights. Work executed in bronze.
- 1976 – "Monumento a Don Diego de Gardoqui", Philadelphia, commissioned in connection with the United States Bicentennial and with the goal of remembering those Spaniards who somehow participated in the American Revolution. Diego de Gardoqui was a professor from Salamanca and the first Spanish Ambassador to the United States. It is a bronze sculpture of the whole body. 3.5 m tall, clad in period jacket. A bust has been made of this work and can be found at the United States Capitol in Washington, D.C. The original currently stands in Sister Cities Park; the inscription reads "1735-1798 Envoy of the King of Spain".
- Undated – "La pensadora" ("The Thinking Woman"), commissioned by Julio Rodríguez Martínez, Minister of Education and Professor of Crystallography, to mark Franco's death and the establishment of the Spanish monarchy, as a gift to King Juan Carlos I on his Coronation Day. It is an onyx carving.
- 1977 – "Monumento a Jacinto Benavente", in Galapagar's Plaza de la Constitución; The Nobel Prize-winning writer lived in the town and was buried there. Cast in bronze and carved in limestone.
- Undated – "Monumento a Antonio Bienvenida", just outside Las Ventas, Madrid. Sculptural group made up of eight bronze figures on a low granite pedestal on which is inscribed "Madrid a Antonio Bienvenida". Commissioned in 1975 by the company Jardón, which was the one that built Madrid's bullring, on the occasion of the bullfighter's death (which was not bullfighting-related).
- Undated – As part of José López Portillo's first visit to Spain after the reestablishment of diplomatic relations with Mexico after Franco's death, two busts were commissioned, one of King Juan Carlos I and the other of the Mexican president to be placed in the Casa de Campo, where a fair was held promoting products from both countries.
- Undated – "Monumento ecuestre del doctor Gustavo Baz", bronze equestrian monument, Mexico.
- 1979–1989 – Whole-body bronze statues of former presidents Miguel Alemán Valdés, Adolfo López Mateos and Lázaro Cárdenas, for the (now former) Presidential Residence "Los Pinos", Mexico City.
- 1979 – "El Caminero", sculptural group made up of a globe with three 12-metre sculptures, one of which is using a lever to push the world forwards, towards progress; the whole stands on a tall pedestal, reaching a combined height of 35 m. It can be found on the highway to Toluca, México. Commissioned by Mexico's Ministry of Communications and Transport for the highway's inauguration.
- 1984 – "Unión del Norte y del Sur" ("Union of the North and the South"). Commissioned by Mexico's Ministry of Communications and Transport for another highway in the state of Veracruz. It is made up of two great bronze figures, one 9 and the other 10 metres tall holding out one hand and, with a small-scale model of the highway bridge, symbolizing the union of Mexico's north and south over the Coatzacoalcos River, which hitherto had been a real impediment to communications.

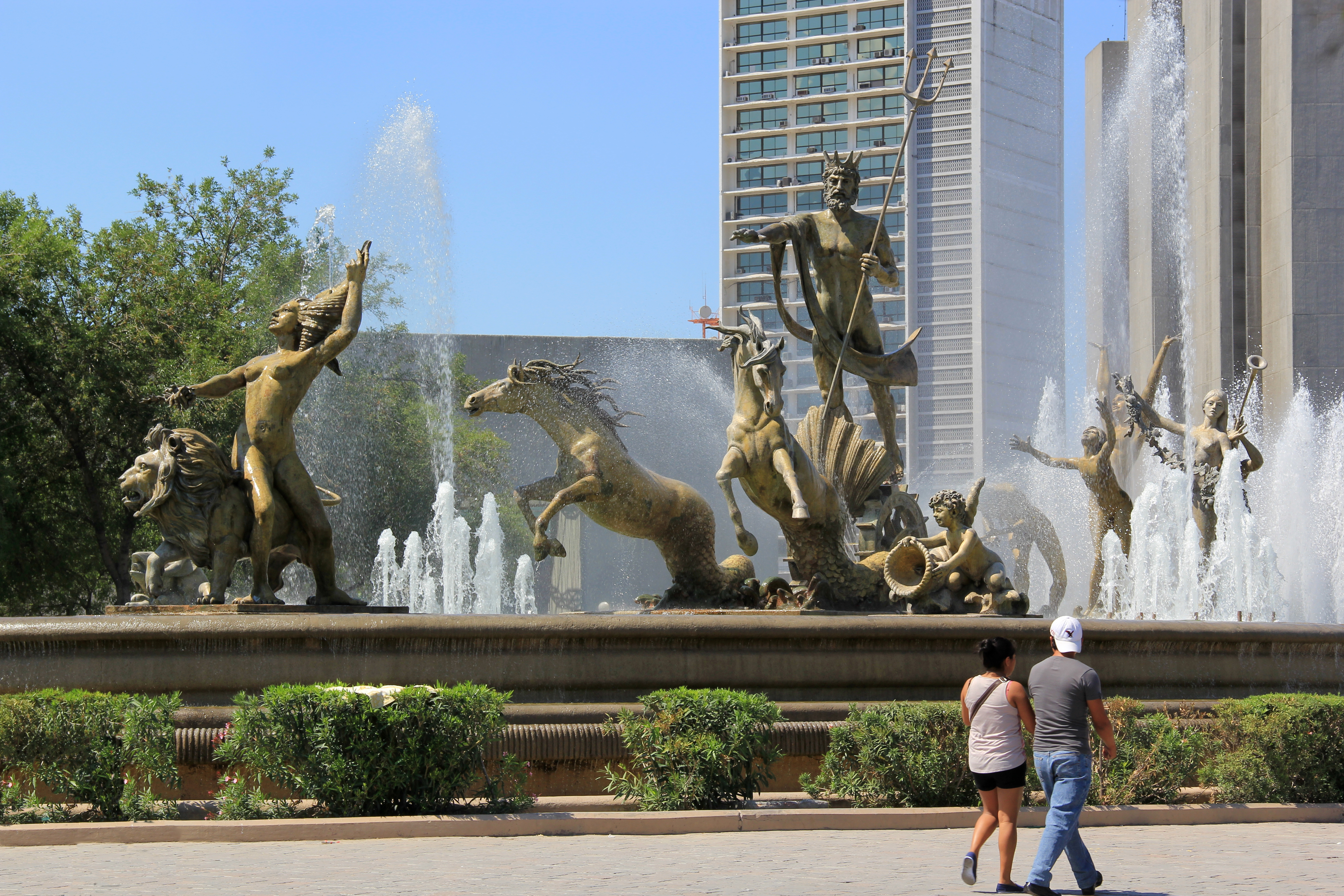
Gran Fuente de La Vida, Monterrey, Mexico, 1984

- 1984 – "Gran Fuente de La Vida" ("Great Fountain of Life"), sited in Monterrey, Nuevo León, Mexico. It is a set with classical-art features incorporated into the modernity otherwise seen at the Gran Plaza, where it stands. This fountain symbolizes the Nuevo León people's struggle to secure an adequate urban water supply, which after great efforts they got, through the much needed pipelines that were laid. The figures are bronze. The central figure is the god Neptune, associated with water, who is driving a carriage pulled by seahorses coming forth from the water. Another sculptural set is made up of five female figures depicting some nymphs in various poses. The foremost figure is a goddess crowning a lion (a state symbol in Nuevo León) for his triumph in the water battle. It was criticized for the choice of the god Neptune from Western classical mythology rather than the Aztec god of water and rain, Tláloc.
- 1984 – Equestrian statue to José López Portillo, then President of Mexico; it was made on a commission from the government of the state of Nuevo León then headed by Alfonso Martínez Domínguez. At first it was thought to put it at the Cerro Prieto dam, and a hill – the one for which the dam is named – even had its top cut off to make way for it. Later, however, it was put at the crossing of the Avenida Sendero and the highway to Laredo within the limits of the municipalities of San Nicolás and Escobedo, where it stayed until 1995 when it was taken down and ended up at a scrapyard in Cadereyta Jiménez. Currently, the initial version of this work belongs to a Monterrey businessman.
- Undated – "Monumento a los Tres Reyes Aztecas" ("Monument to the Three Aztec Kings"), in Ciudad Nezahualcóyotl, Mexico. It is made up of exact reproductions that can be seen at the National Museum of Anthropology.
- 1985 – "Monumento a los Niños Héroes de Chapultepec" ("Monument to the Boy Heroes of Chapultepec"), in the state of Nuevo León.
- 1986 – "Monumento a Manolete, Manuel Rodríguez Sánchez", in bronze and roughly 2 m tall. It stands together with Mexico's three most important bullfighters at the Great Gate of the San Luis Potosí Bullring.
- 1987 – Replica of the "Monumento a Manolete, Manuel Rodríguez Sánchez" on the Calle de Alcalá, Madrid, Spain.
- 1987 – "Monumento a Emiliano Zapata", in San Luis Potosí.
- 1987 – "Monumento a José Cubero, El Yiyo", outside Spain's foremost bullring, Las Ventas in Madrid. Done in bronze, its height is seven metres.
- 1992 – "Raíces" ("Roots"), a fountain on the Paseo de la Princesa, Old San Juan, Puerto Rico. Commissioned by the Puerto Rican government, it represents a boat's bow in the shape of a horse ridden by a child looking at the beautiful horizons, while on the mainmast is a female figure, a goddess symbolizing freedom, and at the stern a nymph is riding two dolphins as a game, decorated with garlands as if welcoming the viewer, on the right side (starboard) there is a Puerto Rican family, father, mother and son, nucleus of every society, and on the left of the group (to port) a native of the land represents culture, folklore, dance and music. The whole set, which is about eight metres tall, was done in bronze.
- 1993 – "Monumento a Juanita Cruz". The first woman who donned the suit of lights and fought bulls in Spain, she had to go into exile and fight bulls in Latin America, where she knew success. Commissioned by her husband out of his own pocket as a homage and in her memory. Sited at the Cementerio de la Almudena in Madrid.

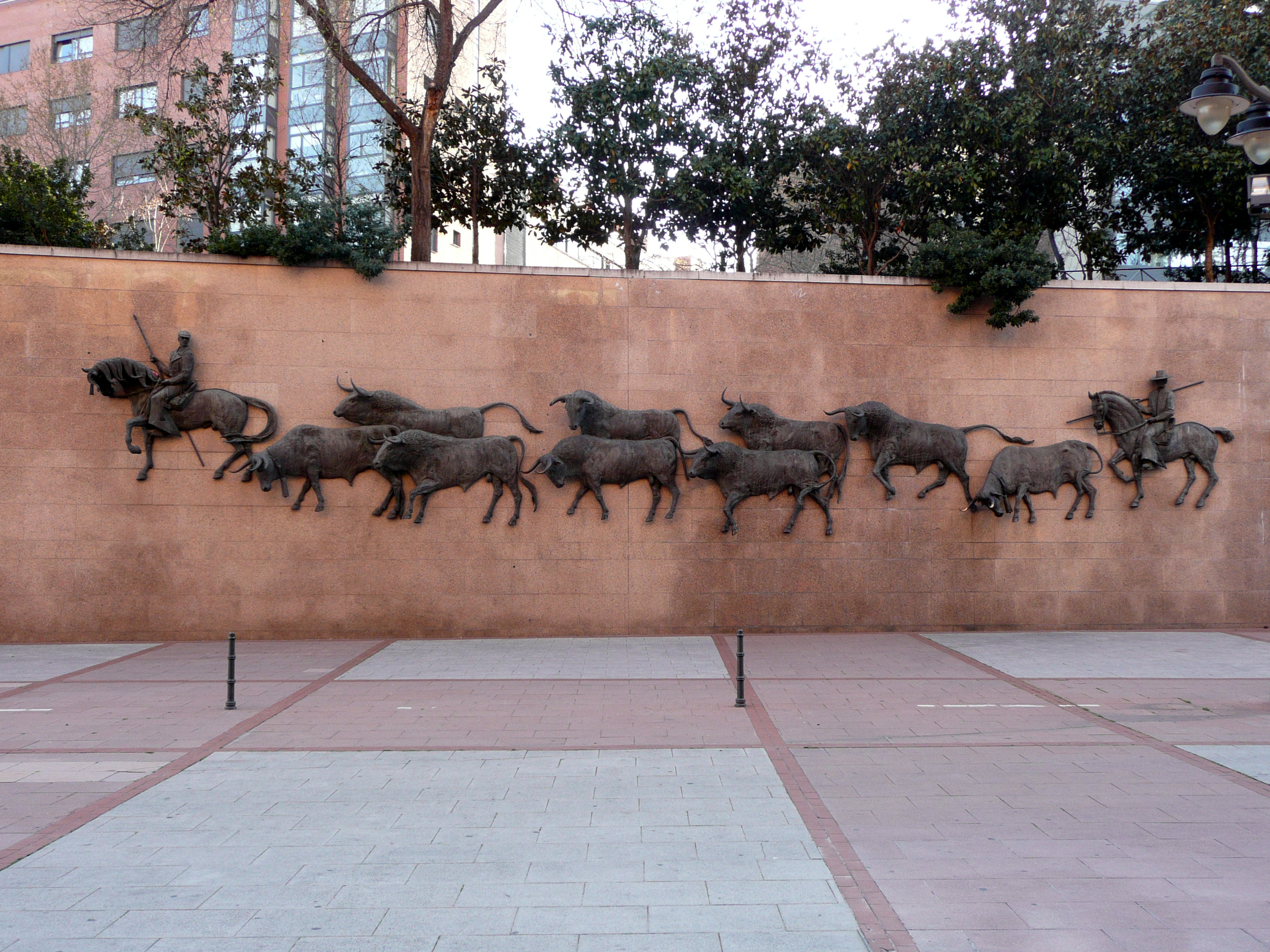
"El Encierro", Las Ventas, Madrid, 1994

- 1994 – "El Encierro", a retaining wall around the Las Ventas bullring in Madrid. High relief in bronze made up of seven bulls, two leading bulls and two overseers directing the herd in the field.
- 1995 – "El Mesonero Mayor de Castilla" ("The Elder Hotelkeeper of Castile"), at the Plaza del Santo Espíritu, Segovia, done in bronze on a commission from the Castilian-Leonese Hostelry Federation, it gives shape to the hotelkeeper as a full body as he carves a suckling pig.
- 1999 – "Despedida del Siglo XX y entrada en el Siglo XXI" ("Farewell to the 20th Century and Entry Into the 21st Century") was placed in 1999 in Madrid's San Blas neighbourhood. Free commission. Uses symbolism to show passing from the old to the new, in both the representations and the materials, bronze and stainless steel.
- 1999 – "Monumento a Miguel de Cervantes". On the Vicálvaro highway at the junction with the Avenida Arcentales in San Blas, Madrid. Executed in bronze with a sketchy finish, as if made of clay, very characteristic of the artist's way of working. The plaque on the pedestal reads: Don Miguel de Cervantes, Príncipe de las letras, en homenaje a la Lengua Española, mayo de 1999 ("Don Miguel de Cervantes, Prince of Letters, in homage to the Spanish Language, May 1999"). It shows Cervantes himself seated in a Renaissance-period chair with a great book in his lap, pen in hand, about to write something by candlelight from a candlestick beside him, while diminutive figures of Don Quijote tilting at the windmills, and Sancho Panza behind him are seen, each astride their mounts. The piece seems to have been inspired by one of Gustave Doré's works.
- 1999 – "El Sol de Marbella", City of Marbella. Executed in bronze with brass, reaches a height of 9 metres.
- 1999 – In this year, the City of Oviedo placed three of Sanguino's sculptures in the city's streets: "Vida" ("Life"), "Libertad" ("Freedom") and "Paz" ("Peace").

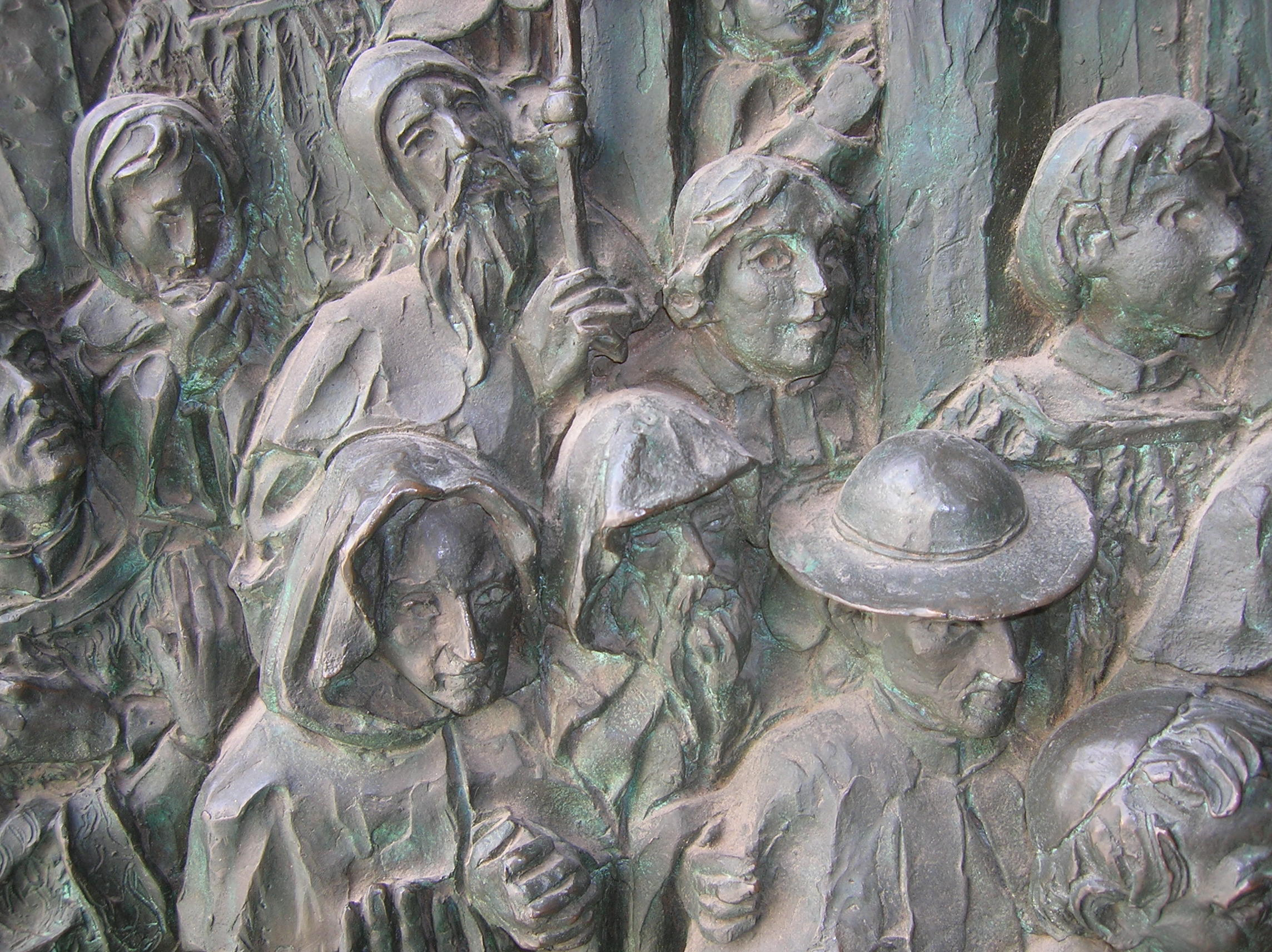
Detail of Sanguino's work on the Almudena Cathedral's doors

- 2000–2001 – Doors to the Almudena Cathedral:
  - 2000 – Those facing the Plaza de la Armería. Made of bronze with a Pompeian green patina. The main door is at the Plaza de La Almudena, and is the one known as the Door of the Most Holy Trinity, as it has on its upper part representations of the Father, the Son and the Holy Ghost. Below appear the Virgin of the Almudena as Madrid's patron ringed by a halo of angels announcing the arrival of the third millennium. The two side doors, Evangelization of the Americas (on the left: a representation of the discovery, that is, Columbus's arrival in the Americas along with his sailors and two representatives of the Catholic Church) and Memory of the History of Spain or Kings' Door (on the right: a representation of all the kings of Spain who, beginning with Pelagius of Asturias and Saint Hermenegild, fought for the Cross from the time of the Reconquista down to the present day).
  - 2001 – Those facing the Calle de Bailén. Made of bronze with a Pompeian green patina. At the central door on the Calle de Bailén, the Door of the Cathedral's Consecration, His Holiness Pope John Paul II consecrated the cathedral in the presence of Cardinal Suquía and Their Majesties the King and Queen of Spain (although this was in 1993, eight years earlier). The side doors represent the apparition of Our Lady of the Almudena and the Holy Virgin blessing Madrid.

Some of Sanguino's models for these doors were scheduled for auction on 23 March 2023.

- 2001 – "Los Doce Apóstoles: San Andrés, Santo Tomás, San Simón, San Juan, San Mateo, San Pedro, Santiago Menor, San Matías, San Judas Tadeo, Santiago Apóstol, San Bartolomé y San Felipe" ("The Twelve Apostles: Saint Andrew, Saint Thomas, Saint Simon, Saint John, Saint Matthew, Saint Peter, Saint James the Less, Saint Matthias, Saint Jude, James the Apostle, Saint Bartholomew and Saint Philip"). Each one bears the symbology and attitude fitting his story. They stand on the twelve pillars that surround the outside of the cathedral's cupola. Done in bronze and finished with a patina of silver nitrate and limestone.
- 2001 – "Monumento a Mariano Barberán y Collar", standing in La Concordia Park, commissioned by Guadalajara city council. Mariano Barberán was a captain and an aviator born in Guadalajara, teacher and director at the School of the Observers of the Four Winds, who together with Lieutenant Joaquín Collar Serra undertook a flight from Seville to Mexico (10 June 1933), whose first non-stop leg of 8,095 kilometres was to Camagüey in Cuba, done in 39 hours and 50 minutes, which broke all records. Appearing in the monument are two stainless steel aircraft wings, and busts of the two protagonists over the aircraft in which they performed their feat. The plaque on the granite pedestal says: "La ciudad de Guadalajara al Capitán Barberán y al Teniente Collar. Héroes del vuelo Transoceánico del Cuatro Vientos en 1933. 20 de junio de 2001." ("The City of Guadalajara to Captain Barberán and Lieutenant Collar. Heroes of the Transoceanic flight of the Cuatro Vientos" in 1933. 20 June 2001."). Sadly, Barberán and Collar, along with their aircraft, vanished somewhere in Mexico before reaching their final destination, and no trace of them has ever been found.

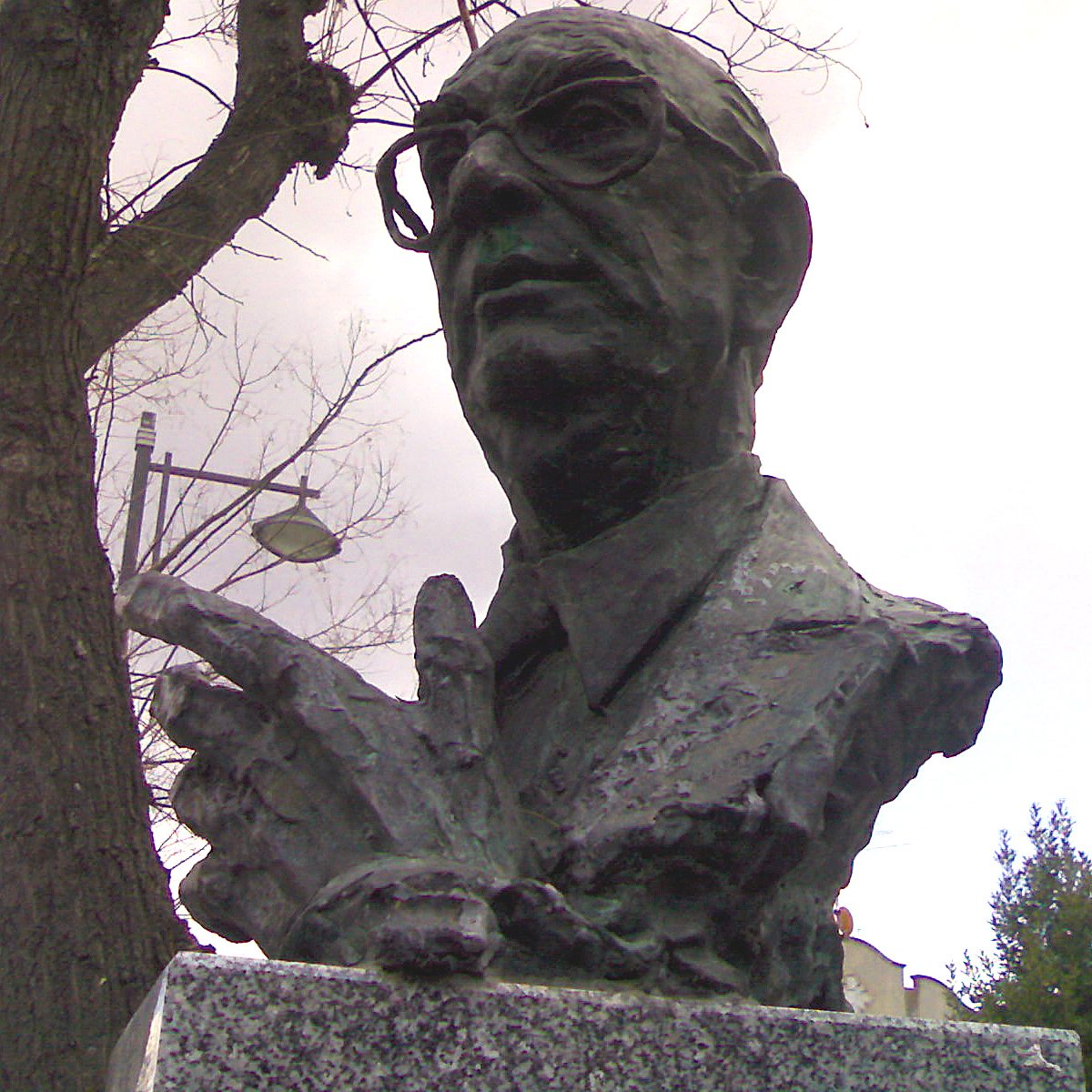
Bust of Camilo José Cela Trulock, Guadalajara, 2003

- 2002 – Sculpture of Bret Hanover, an American Standardbred racehorse (1962–1992), in bronze, originally stood outside Castleton Farm's office, but now stands at Bret Hanover's grave at the Champions Cemetery at the Kentucky Horse Park.
- 2003 – Busts on the Avenida de Francisco Fernández Ipazaguirre, commissioned by Guadalajara city council. They are a series of nine busts in bronze on a granite pedestal which bears an explanatory plaque as to who those depicted were and their relationships with the city:
  - Bust of Izraq Ibn-Muntil on whose plaque it says: "Gobernador de la ciudad Árabe y nacido en Guadalajara." ("Governor of the Arab city and born in Guadalajara.")
  - Bust of Alvarfayez de Minaya, Christian warrior who reconquered the city of Guadalajara.
  - Bust of Mose Ben Sen Tob de León (13th century), philosopher and rabbi born in Guadalajara, author of Zohar, a Kabbalistic text.
  - Bust of Íñigo López de Mendoza, 1st Marquis of Santillana (1398-1458), poet, writer of Las Serranillas (a serranilla being a kind of poem).
  - Bust of Nuño Beltrán de Guzmán (1499-1544), conquistador and founder of the like-named city of Guadalajara in Mexico.
  - Bust of Francisco Fernández Iparraguirre (1852-1889), pharmacist, founder of the Scientific, Literary and Artistic Athaenium of Guadalajara and culture promoter in said city.
  - Bust of María Diega Desmaissieres y Sevillano, duchess in the late 19th and early 20th centuries whose works include one of Guadalajara's most emblematic: the pantheon that bears her name, loved in the city for her many beneficent works.
  - Bust of Guadalajara's own Antonio Buero Vallejo (1916-2000). Playwright, academic, Premio Nacional de Teatro and Miguel de Cervantes Prize.
  - Bust in homage to Camilo José Cela Trulock, whose relationship with Guadalajara was established beginning with his journeys through La Alcarria, which gave rise to his like-named novel, written in 1948. On his plaque it says: "Escritor, Premio Nobel de Literatura, Premio Nacional de las Letras Españolas y Premio Cervantes" ("Writer, Nobel Prize in Literature, Premio Nacional de las Letras Españolas and Miguel de Cervantes Prize").

A replica, although of greater size, of the bust of Buero Vallejo was made for the Teatro de Buero Vallejo in Guadalajara.

- Undated – "La Virgen de La Antigua", outside her hermitage, sited in Guadalajara. Executed in bronze on a granite column.
- Undated – "Busto de San Juan Bosco", found in the park that bears his (John Bosco's) name, also in Guadalajara. Executed in bronze on a granite pedestal with an explanatory plaque.
- 2003 – "Monumento al torero Félix Colomo", found in the roundabout of the Puerta Grande De Navalcarnero which bears the bullfighter's name, Madrid, a torero who saw himself withdraw from the bullfighting world owing to political problems, thereafter giving himself over to hostelry with much success. Sculptural set in bronze with figures of a bull and the bullfighter.
- 2004 – "Monumento a Vicente Ruiz", Elder Hotelkeeper of Navalcarnero. Sculptural set in bronze.
- 2006 – "Monumento a la Constitución y a la Democracia", stands at Navalcarnero's Plaza del Nuevo Ayuntamiento ("New Town Hall Square"). It is a granite monolith some 10 m tall at whose bottom is found the town's first democratically elected mayor in elections held after the Francoist dictatorship.
- 2007 – "Monumento Mausoleo de Rocío Jurado". Direct commission from Rocío Jurado's family. It is a bronze figure of the artist seated on her grave. The Mausoleum is completed with a shrine made of white marble from Macael which is topped with a pyramidal cupola with a crystal roof. It stands in Chipiona. In 2023, another work of Jurado by Sanguino, this one a bronze bust commissioned by Jurado herself, went for auction at the Fernando Durán auction house. Jurado and Sanguino were good friends.
- 2008 – "Monumento al Arrastre" ("Arrastre" is the dragging of a dead bull from the bullring), at the Félix Colomo de la Villa bullring in Navalcarnero. It is a sculptural set in bronze with brown patina that represents the moment when the bull is dragged out after the bullfight by a team of mules accompanied by the mule drivers.
- 2010 – Murals that complete the portico that will open onto the Plaza de la Almudena at Almudena Cathedral in Madrid. They represent with their bronze reliefs the Virgin's Five Joyful Mysteries: the Annunciation, the Visitation, the Birth of Jesus, the Presentation of Jesus at the Temple and the Finding of Jesus in the Temple.
- 2015 – "Monumento a la Guardia Civil", stands before Civil Guard Headquarters in Segovia. About this sculpture, Sanguino quipped "I have created the only Guardia Civil who does not impose fines." The Civil Guard's director general, Arsenio Fernández de Mesa, travelled to Segovia to preside over the unveiling.
- 2017 – "Bust of Saint Anthony", installed at Saint Anthony's shrine in Navas de San Antonio, a bronze bust of Saint Anthony of the Hill ("San Antonio del Cerro") holding the Christ Child. It is about 55 cm tall. This project's main promoter was the parish priest Don Juan Pérez. The inscription on one side reads "En homenaje a Don Juan, por su gran dedicación y su labor pastoral con enorme devoción a San Antonio bendito" ("In homage to Don Juan, for his great dedication and his pastoral work with enormous devotion to Blessed Saint Anthony"). Don Juan had been the parish priest for 32 years by this time.
- Undated – Figure of bullfighter Julio Robles fighting a bull, on public, outdoor display in Ahigal de los Aceiteros.

=== Portraits ===
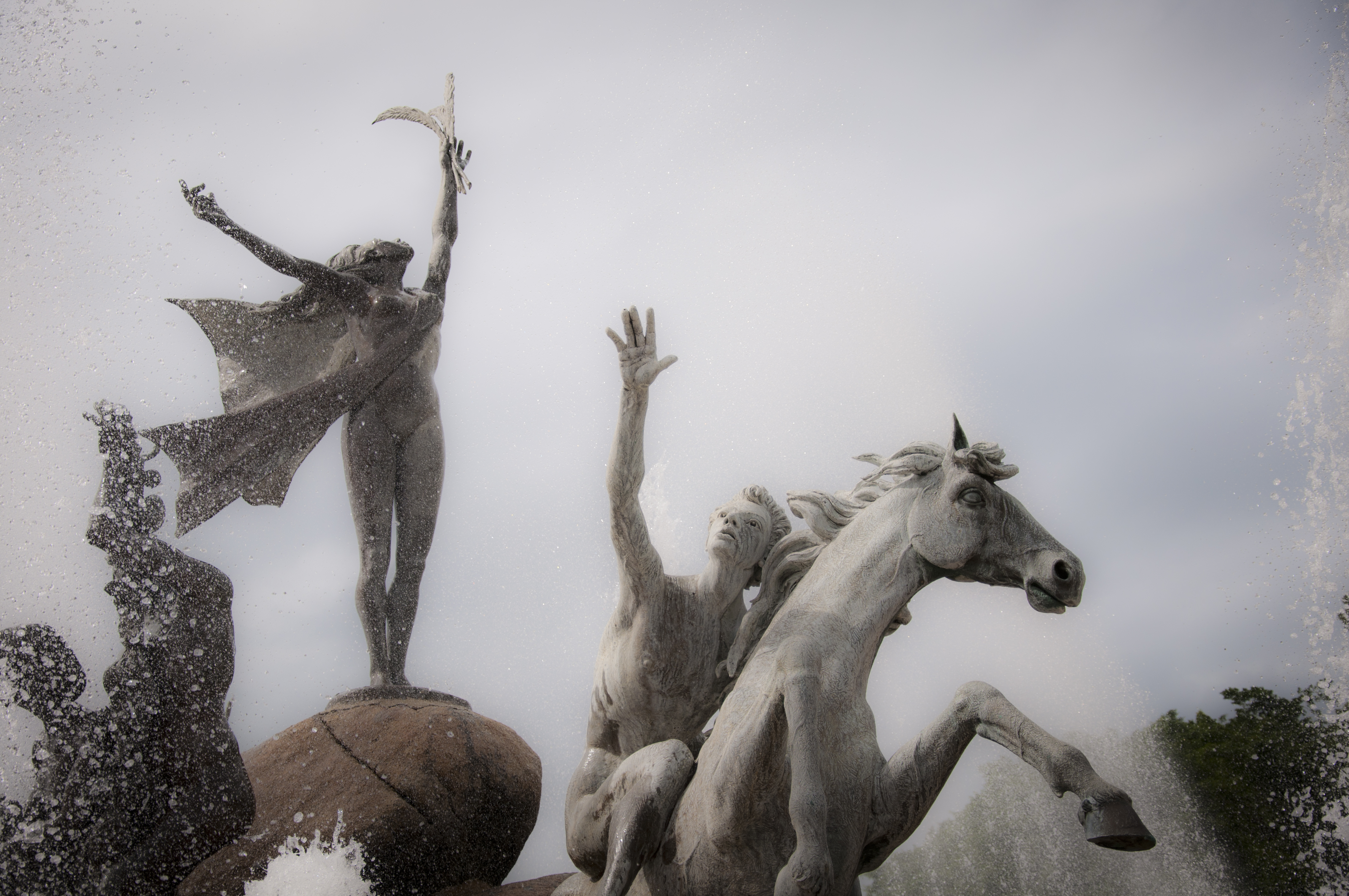
Statue I on the Paseo de la Princesa in San Juan, Puerto Rico.

Throughout his career, Sanguino executed a considerable number of busts or portraits, to perhaps a total of some five or six hundred busts. The people whom he rendered in sculpture range from presidents of countries to cardinals, writers, kings and queens, bullfighters, singers, musicians, actors, popes and those who were otherwise prominent.

==== United States ====
After Sanguino's appearance on an American television programme that enjoyed the country's greatest audience – The Tonight Show, then hosted by Johnny Carson – on which he executed a portrait of the host live, and was interviewed afterwards by him, the commissions would not stop.

In 1961 Sanguino executed in bronze a bust of Donald W. Douglas, founder of the Douglas Aircraft Company, on commission from the aeronautical company that bears his name, in Los Angeles, California.

The next year, Sanguino did a bust of John Fitzgerald Kennedy to put it in one of his exhibitions. In the end, it was acquired by the Kennedy family. The work was commissioned by the then United States President's brother Robert F. Kennedy.

In 1963, the New York Port Authority commissioned from Sanguino a colossal marble bust of Fiorello La Guardia, New York's ninety-ninth mayor, to stand in LaGuardia Airport's central lobby. This job took him eighteen years.

==== Spain ====
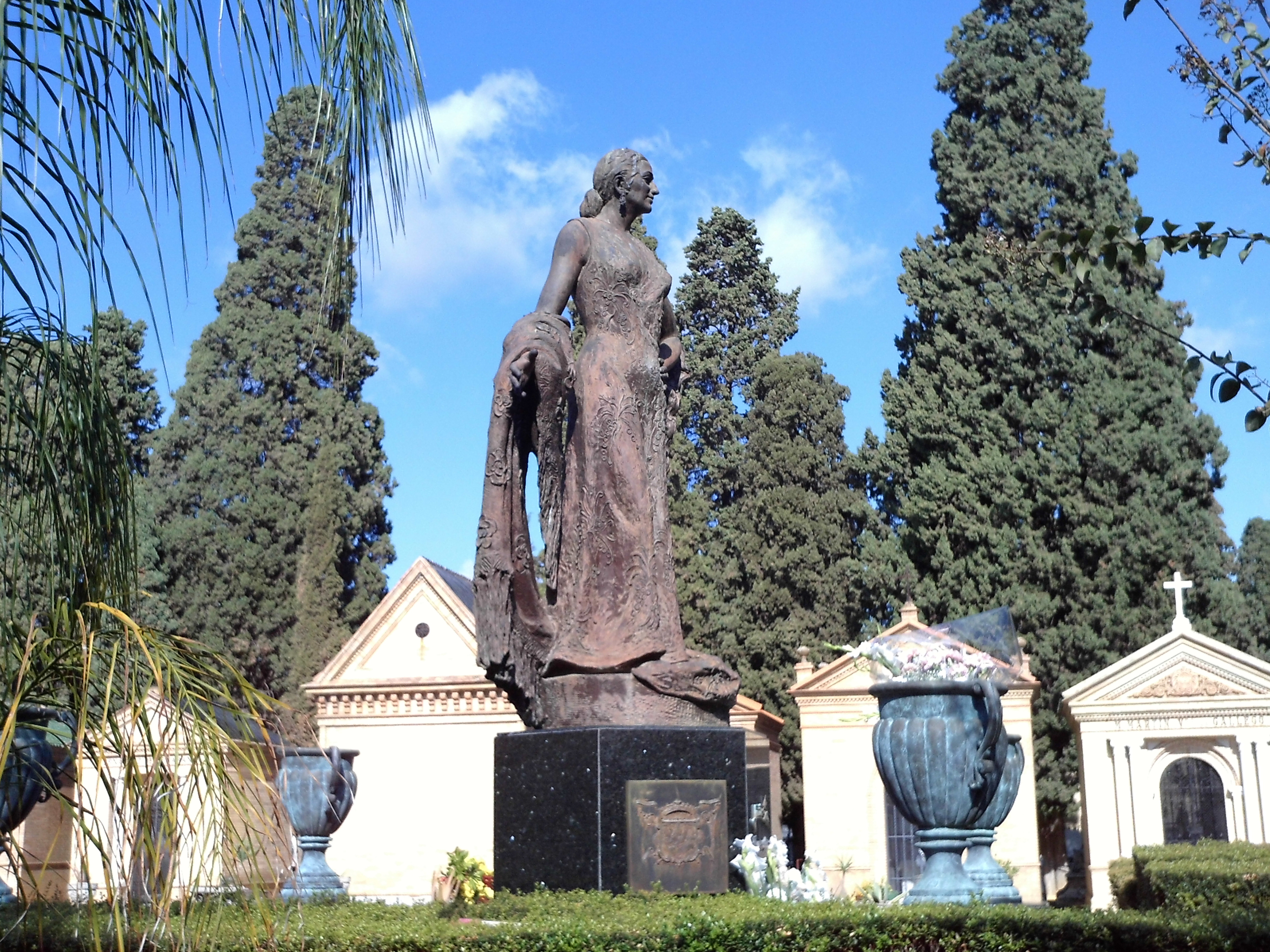
Monumento a Juanita Reina, Cemetery of San Fernando, Seville

At the Museo Taurino de Madrid (a bullfighting museum), which is found on the Patio de Caballos at the Las Ventas bullring, visitors may contemplate busts of Serranito, Andrés Vázquez and Falcón (a Mexican bullfighter), along with Juan Belmonte's media-verónica (a bullfighting move) and bust, all in bronze.

At the Museo Taurino de la Real Maestranza de Sevilla (another bullfighting museum) in Seville are other of Sanguino's works, the Monument to Ángel Peralta Pineda and the Bust of Juanita Reina.

At the Cemetery of San Fernando in Seville, visitors may see the "Monumento a Juanita Reina", a whole-body figure executed in bronze by Sanguino.

In 1991 Sanguino's bronze bust of the singer Pedro Vargas was unveiled at the Jardines del Retiro de Madrid, by commission from the singer's friends and family.

In 1996, the Castilian-Leonese Hostelry Federation commissioned from Sanguino a bronze bust of Cándido, a famous local restaurateur, to be put before his inn next to the Aqueduct of Segovia. It was unveiled in 2003.

Sanguino had busts of Their Majesties Juan Carlos I of Borbón (four copies can be found at: Agencia EFE, the Club Financiero Génova in Madrid, the Ministry of Tourism; another was bought by the Banco de Alfonso Fierro) and Queen Sofía.

Also prominent are: the bust of Miguel de Unamuno, commissioned by President of Mexico José López Portillo; the bust of Federico García Lorca; the bust of Pío Baroja, a commission from San Sebastián city council; all were executed in bronze.

==== Mexico ====
Given that Pope John Paul II was to make the first apostolic visit to Mexico during José López Portillo's presidency, Sanguino executed by commission two busts of the Pontiff by which to remember his visit. Even though he was commissioned to make only two busts, he made three bronze copies: one for Toluca Cathedral in the capital of the state of México, another for President López Portillo's mother's private chapel at the then Presidential Residence "Los Pinos", and a third, which Sanguino himself kept, even though he had been asked to have it placed next to the Church of Our Lady of the Fuencisla in Segovia. Later, he had to make another to put in a square in Huelva.

In 1989, Sanguino executed a bust of President Carlos Salinas de Gortari.

== The woman in Sanguino's work ==
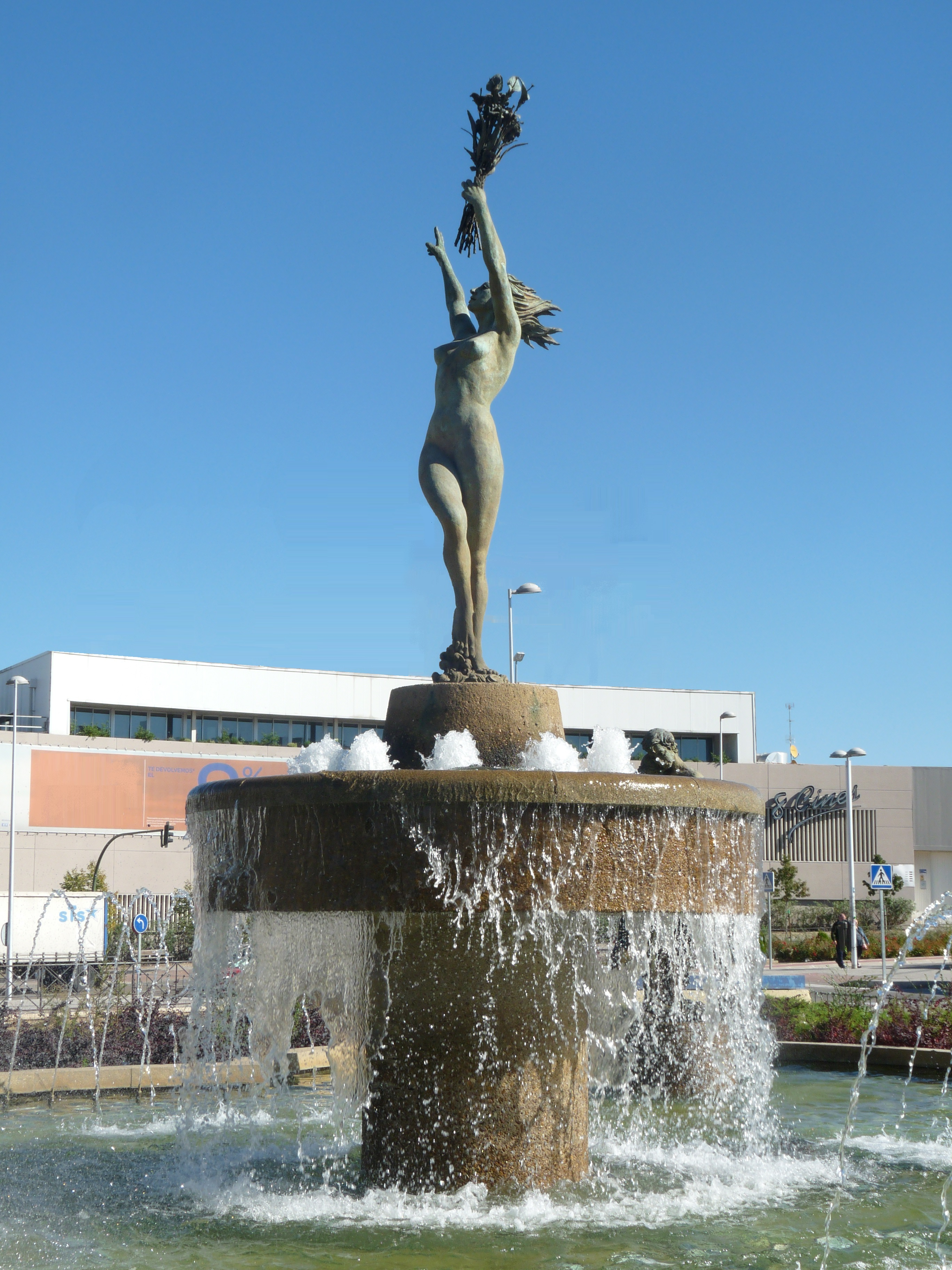
The central figure in Sanguino's work "En Homenaje a la Mujer", San Blas, Madrid, 1998

The artist saw in the woman life's wellspring, continuity, the procreator of new generations and the best medium of expression for all human feelings. Furthermore, one can see how the artist returned to the woman in all instances when he was not referring concretely to male characters, but rather to ideas, such as the seasons of the year, life's wellspring, "Raíces", "El Sol de Marbella", etc.

A direct example of homage to the woman might be "En Homenaje a la Mujer" ("In Homage to the Woman"), a fountain sculpture dating from 1998, found in Madrid's San Blas neighbourhood (on the Calle Hermanos García Noblejas), commissioned by the San Blas District Councillor, Isaac Ramos, to pay homage to the woman in a residential area called "Las Rosas". The fountain was conceived as five sculptural sets, each representing the woman at different ages, always beautiful and free. The first group is the mother with her newborn child, representing both childhood and motherhood; the second group is the woman playing sports and games, representing youth through an adolescent girl; the third shows infatuation, putting the woman together with the man to whom she gives herself when she loves him; the fourth group represents maturity through a mature woman together with her granddaughter with whom she begins a new life to which she passes down her wisdom and vital experience. In the centre and raised above a bowl of water is the woman in her fullness, bearing a bunch of flowers, a symbol of the woman's triumph.
