= Joséf Pagés =

Joséf Pagés, who was born circa 1740 and died after 1822, was a Spanish guitar maker of the Cádiz school.

== Life and work ==
Joséf Pagés was probably born in Ecija, Sevilla around 1740. His brother Juan Pagés also became a notable guitar maker. It is thought that Joséf was the first of the brothers to go to Cádiz around 1760. He established his workshop in "Calle de la Amargura, nº 13", by 1809. A leading member of the Cádiz school, Joséf, followed very closely all the innovations that Francisco Sanguino had introduced, but with the additional development of doming the soundboard with the struts, an approach that later makers such as Jose Recio, Antonio de Torres, and Francisco Gonzales also adopted. Pagés started with systems of three braces, like the early guitars of Sanguino and Benedid; his later instruments used five.

His guitars greatly influenced Louis Panormo, who used similar fan strutting designs and similar proportions for the body of the guitar.

The great Spanish composer and guitarist Fernando Sor thought highly of Pagés's guitars, stating 'The guitars to which I have always given preference are those of Alonso of Madrid, Pagés and Benediz of Cádiz, Joseph and Manuel Martinez of Malaga...' The composer Dionisio Aguado also mentions the Pagés brothers as among the makers he would recommend. Joséf Pagés's known surviving guitars date from the 1790s to 1822.

== Guitars ==
This is an incomplete list of guitars made by Joséf Pagés.

- 1791 - A six course Juan Pages instrument in the Granary-Guitars museum, UK.
- 1805 - In the collection of the Royal Academy of Music, London.
- 1809 - (no. 70) Plucked, struck and fretted guitar labeled "Josef Pages Me Hizo En Cadiz Ano de 1809 Calle de la Amargura N.70". Length of back 455mm (17 15/16in), the soundhole surrounded by concentric circular dotted wood, with 16 nickel frets to soundhole, with later tied bridge, with some inked manuscript lining on the inner back and ribs, the head cut down with machines added for 6 strings, in lined and fitted mahogany brass mounted case. Sold 15 December 2009 for £8,160, inclusive of Buyer's Premium, at Bonhams.
- 1810 - (no.30) In the private collection of Timothy Lawrence Williams (MA).
- 1811 - In the collection of Ringve Museum, Trondhjem, Norway. (images, technical drawing / construction plan)
- 1813 - The University of Edinburgh Collection of Historic Musical Instruments Item #282 is a 6-course: (6 x 2) strings, 12 strings guitar.
- 1818 - Mentioned in Romanillos, J.L., Bream, J. Antonio de Torres: Guitar Maker, His Life and Work (Bold Strummer, 1997) p. 94

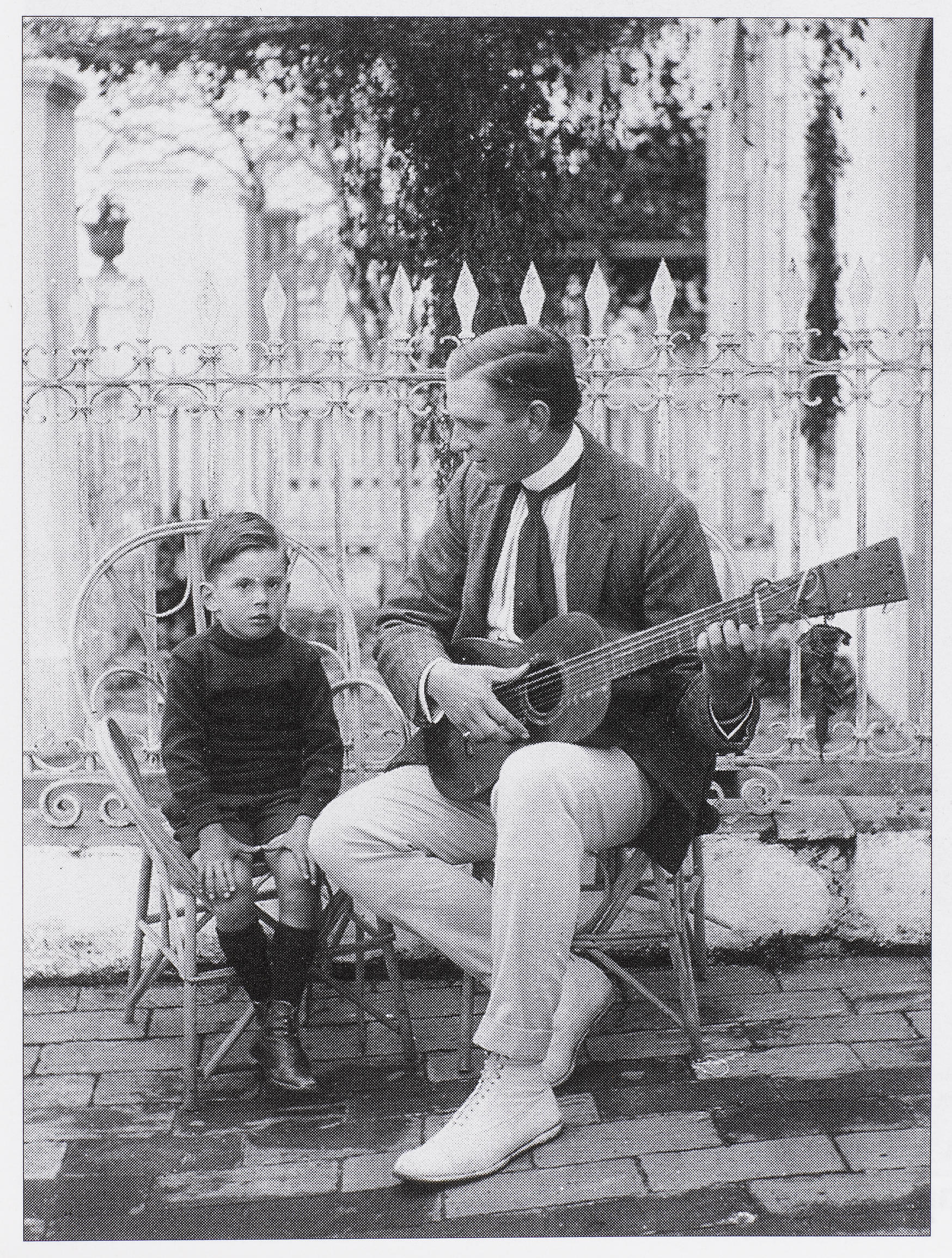
Andrew Galliano, playing a guitar by Joséf Pagés.

- 1822 - (no.177) Spanish Six-course guitar, labeled "Josef Pages Me Hizo En Cadiz ano de 1822" and inserted over top of label in script Calle del Sacramento in print no. 70 and inscribed over no 177. Length of back 455mm (17 15/16in); Upper bouts 217mm; Middle bouts 177mm; Lower bouts 281mm. The soundhole is surrounded by a band of inlaid white circles on a black ground with further concentric circles surrounding the sound hole. The six course head has 12 pegs, with 10 brass frets to the body with later bridge with an inlaid cartouche under the bridge. The back and ribs is made of various coloured wood and shows some slight wear and tear due to use and age. The guitar has a soft black case. The guitar previously belonged to Antonio Maria Galliano (1841–1903) of the Galliano Bank. The guitar passed from Antonio Maria Galliano to his eldest son, Andrew (1875–1939). When Andrew died in 1939, the guitar passed to his only son, Jacinto, who died in 1967 without issue. Andrew's widow, Ana Bonell de Galliano (1880–1969) gave the guitar to her nephew Francis (Paco) Galliano OBE, ex-Chairman of A.L. Galliano Bankers Ltd. On 10 March 2008, Francis Galliano sold the guitar for £6,600 at auction via Bonhams.

== See also ==
- Classical guitar making
