= Sanguino =

Sanguino is a surname. Notable people with the surname include:

- Jhohan Sanguino (born 1998), Venezuelan weightlifter
- Luis Sanguino (born 1934), Spanish sculptor

== See also ==
- Savore Sanguino, Italian sauce
