= Gibraltar International Bank =

State-owned bank of Gibraltar

- Company type: Government-owned corporation
- Industry: Banking financial services
- Founded: 2015
- Headquarters: Gibraltar International Bank Ltd, Ince's House, 310 Main Street, Gibraltar, GX11 1AA
- Area served: Gibraltar
- Key people: Peter Horton (chief executive officer); Kathy Castle (chief operating officer); David Bruce (Chief Business Officer)
- Products: Retail banking Commercial banking
- Website: www.gibintbank.gi

The Gibraltar International Bank (GIB), also referred to as Gib Bank, is a public bank in Gibraltar. It was established in 2015 and is wholly owned by the Government of Gibraltar.

== History ==
Gibraltar International Bank was conceived in the 1990s. Plans to make this a reality occurred in 2012 after a major international retail bank pulled out of Gibraltar. The Government of Gibraltar decided to open a local bank to replace the one that had left the territory. The bank would be owned by the government but would be run by an independent board of directors and would be run commercially with staff recruited privately. The bank would be located in Ince's Hall, a Georgian-era garrison armoury that had formerly been a nightclub and was the only building in Gibraltar that existed prior to the Siege of Gibraltar that had not been substantially modified.

Gibraltar International Bank's opening was delayed and was contingent upon Barclays Gibraltar closing their operations to allow the Gibraltar International Bank to replace them. The bank was eventually opened for public business in March 2015. It would later adopt the corporate shorthand of "Gib Bank" in the 2020s.

== Controversies ==
The bank has had a number of technical controversies. In 2022, Gibraltar International Bank customers were being charged repeatedly for the same transaction. This was attributed by the bank as a fault with an external card transaction processor. In 2025, the Royal Gibraltar Police warned customers to be aware of phishing scams claiming to be from the bank.

== See also ==
- List of banks in Gibraltar
