= Navas de San Antonio =

- Municipality
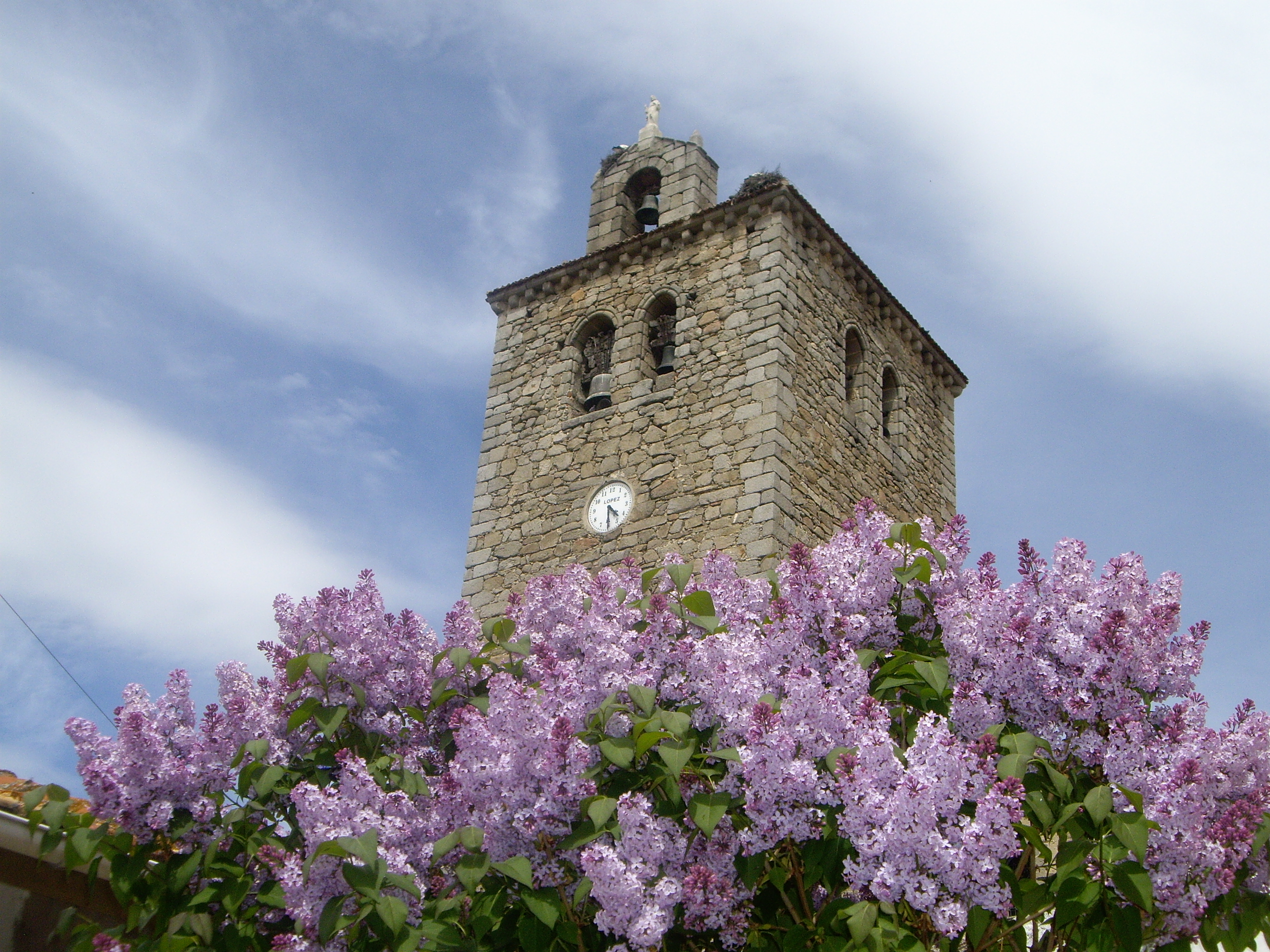
- Church of San Nicolas de Bari in Navas de San Antonio.

- Flag Coat of arms

- Location in Spain. Navas de San Antonio (Spain)
- Coordinates: 40°45′40″N 4°19′48″W
- Country: Spain
- Autonomous community: Castile and León
- Province: Segovia
- Municipality: Navas de San Antonio

Area
  - Total: 69 km^{2} (27 sq mi)

Population (2025-01-01)
  - Total: 368
  - Density: 5.3/km^{2} (14/sq mi)
- Time zone: UTC+1 (CET)
  - Summer (DST): UTC+2 (CEST)
- Website: Official website

Navas de San Antonio is a municipality located in the province of Segovia, Castile and León, Spain. According to the 2004 census (INE), the municipality has a population of 327 inhabitants.
