= Valdeprados =

- Municipality
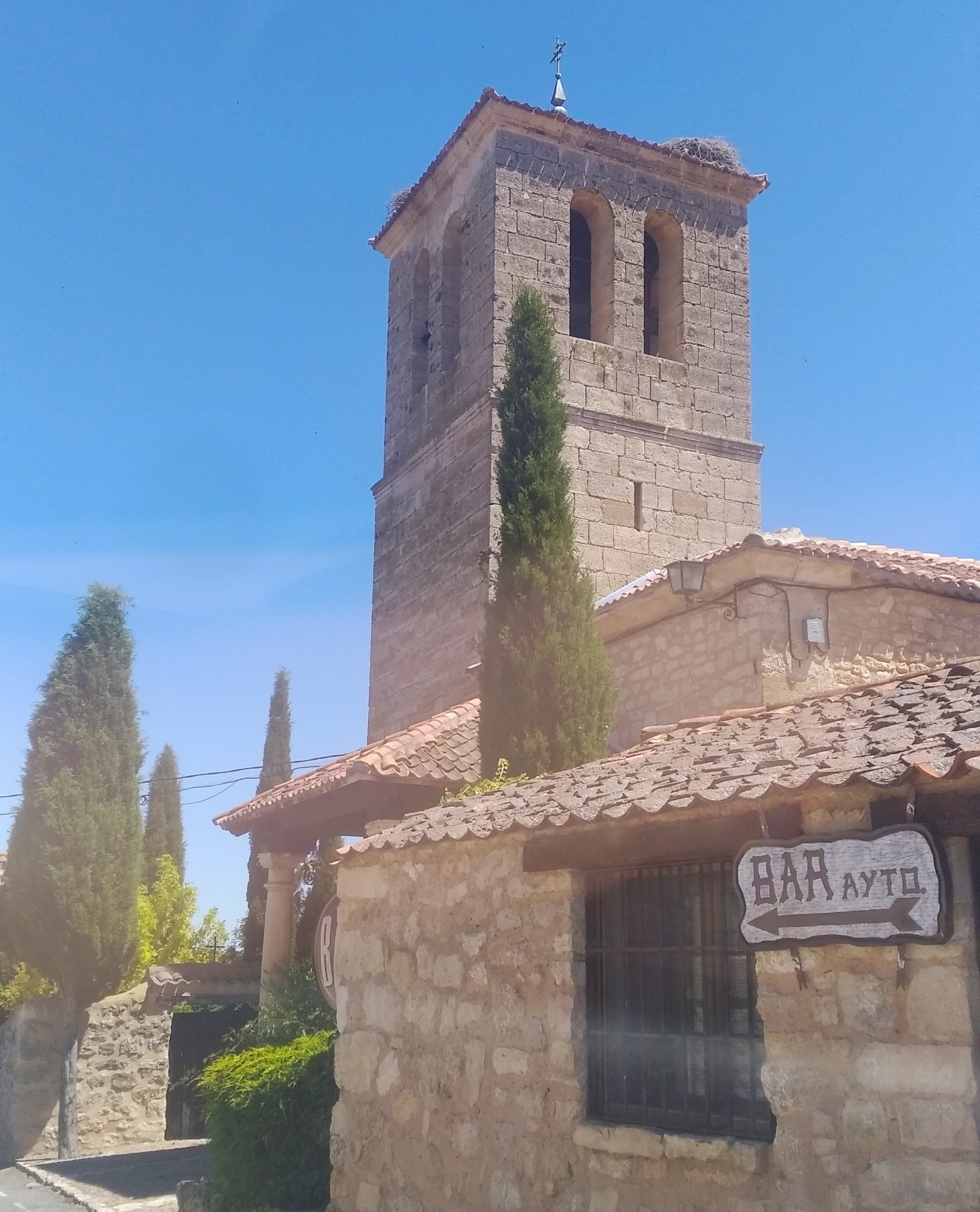
- Church of Saint Eulalia of Mérida in Valdeprados (Segovia, Spain).

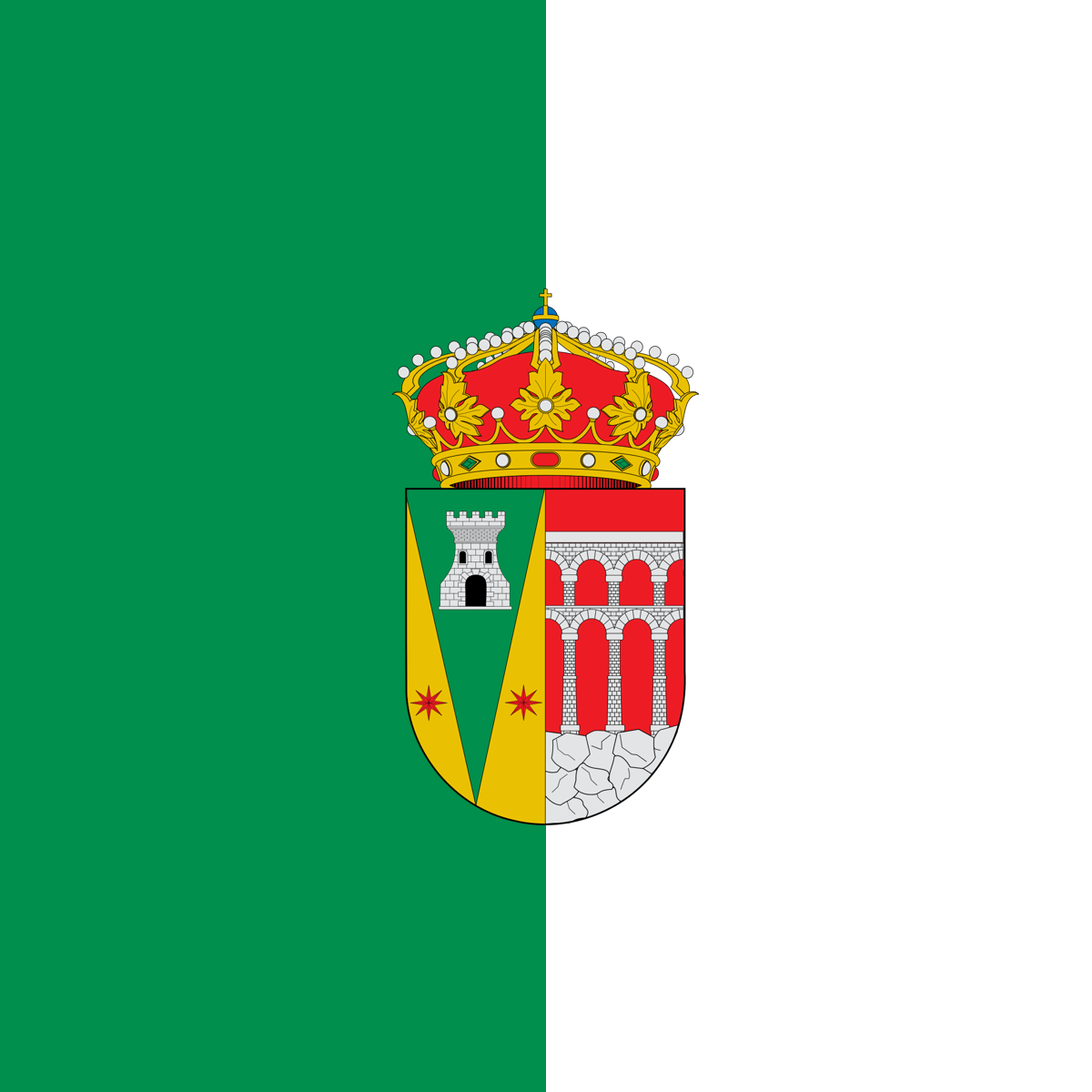
- Flag Coat of arms

- Location in Spain. Valdeprados (Spain)
- Coordinates: 40°49′03″N 4°15′25″W
- Country: Spain
- Autonomous community: Castile and León
- Province: Segovia
- Municipality: Valdeprados

Area
  - Total: 19 km^{2} (7.3 sq mi)

Population (2025-01-01)
  - Total: 63
  - Density: 3.3/km^{2} (8.6/sq mi)
- Time zone: UTC+1 (CET)
  - Summer (DST): UTC+2 (CEST)
- Website: Official website

Valdeprados is a municipality located in the province of Segovia, Castile and León, Spain. According to the 2020 census (INE), the municipality has a population of 69 inhabitants.
