= Savore Sanguino =

Florentine sauce

Savore Sanguino is a rich and red Florentine sauce originating in the 14th century. Literally translated the name of the sauce is Taste (Savore) of Blood (Sanguino). Main ingredients were raisins, cinnamon, sandal and sumac. Other possible ingredients were meat and wine.
