= Jyske Bank =

Danish bank

Jyske Bank A/S

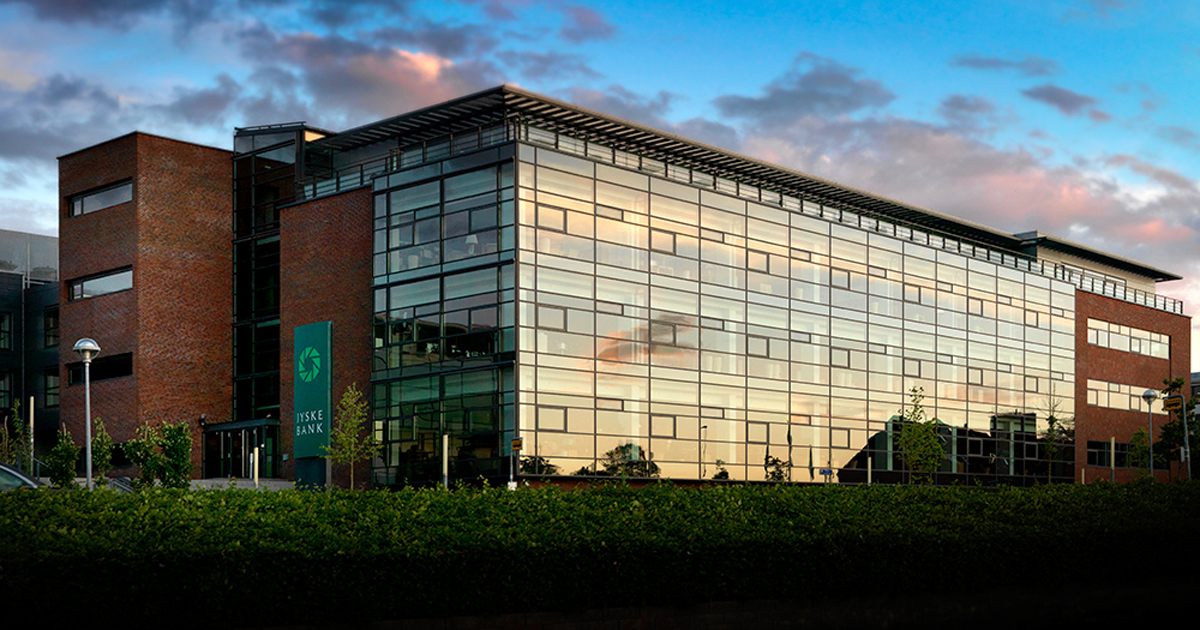
- Jyske Bank's headquarters in Silkeborg, Denmark.
- Type: Aktieselskab
- Traded as: Nasdaq Copenhagen: JYSK
- Industry: Financial services
- Founded: 1967; 59 years ago
- Headquarters: Silkeborg, Denmark
- Key people: Kurt Bligaard Pedersen (Chairman), Lars Mørch (CEO)
- Products: Retail, private and business banking
- Revenue: DKK 6.067 billion (2010)
- Net income: DKK 757.2 million (2010)
- Total assets: DKK 750.2 billion (end 2024)
- Total equity: DKK 13.35 billion (end 2010)
- Number of employees: 3,363 (FTE, end of Q3 2020)
- Website: jyskebank.com

Jyske Bank A/S is the third largest Danish bank in terms of market share.

The headquarters are located in Silkeborg, and the bank has 98 branches, in Denmark, and a single one in Hamburg, Germany. It is listed on the Copenhagen Stock Exchange, and it is headquartered outside of Copenhagen.

== History ==
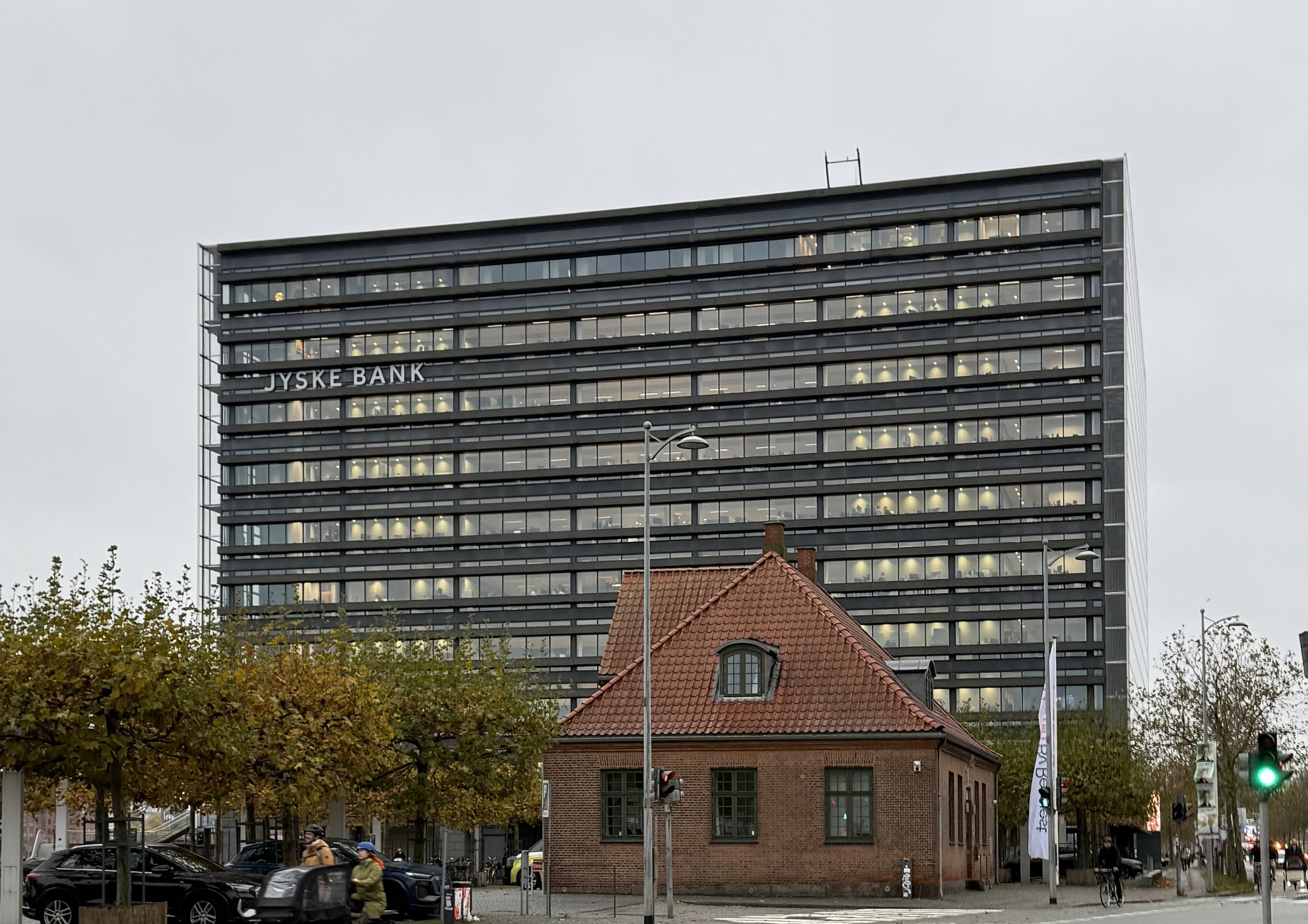
Jyske Bank building in Copenhagen

Jyske Bank is the result of the merger in 1967 of four banks from the mid-Jutland area: Silkeborg Bank, Kjellerup Bank, Kjellerup Handels- og Landbobank, and the Handels- og Landbrugsbank in Silkeborg. These banks trace their roots back to the mid-19th Century.

- 1968 – Jyske Bank acquired Banken for Brædstrup og Omegn.
- 1970 – Jyske Bank acquired Samsø Bank.
- 1970 – Jyske Bank acquired Odder Landbobank.
- 1981 – Jyske Bank acquired Copenhagen-based Finansbanken.
- 1983 – Jyske Bank acquired Vendelbobanken.
- 1989 – Jyske Bank acquired Holstebro Bank.
- 2011 – Jyske Bank acquired most of Fjordbank Mors.
- 2013 – Jyske Bank acquired Spar Lolland201.
- 2014 – Jyske Bank acquired BRFkredit A/S.
- 2022 – Jyske Bank acquired the Danish branch of Svenska Handelsbanken.

== International expansion ==
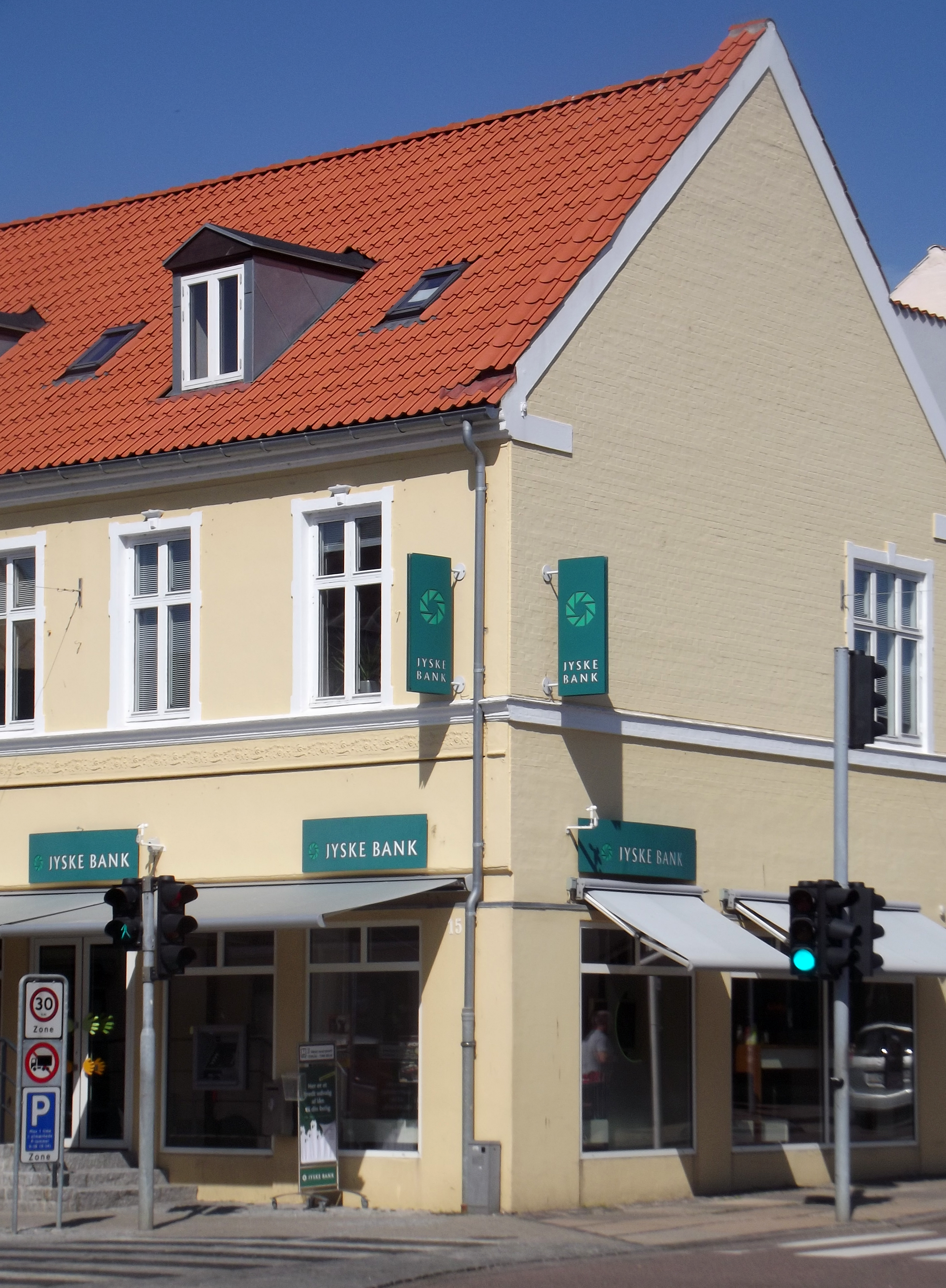
Jyske Bank, Frederikssund.

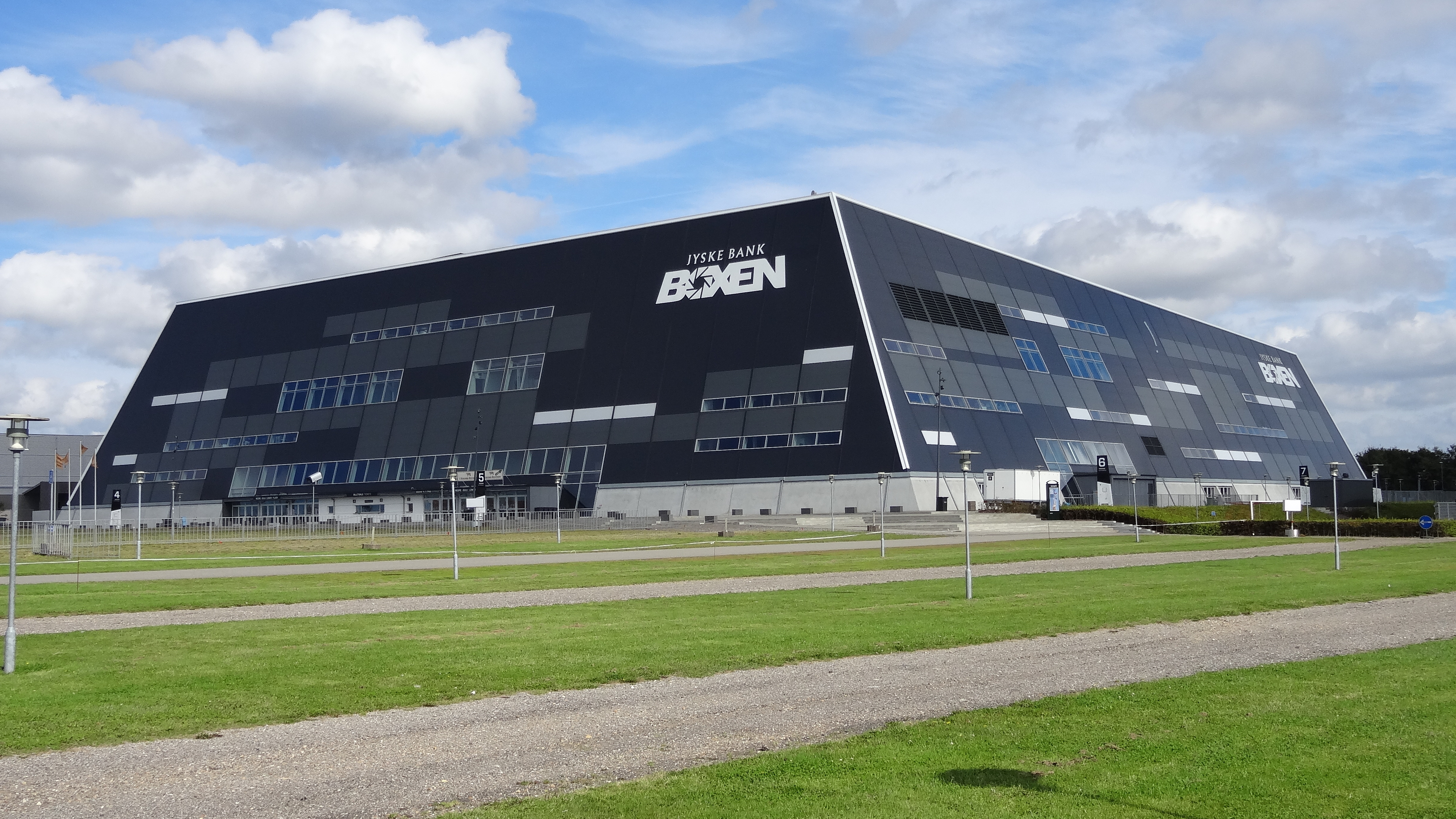
Jyske Bank Boxen arena in Herning.

- 1981 – With its merger with Finansbanken, Jyske Bank acquired the subsidiary in Zurich, Switzerland, that Finansbanken had established in 1970 under the name Finanz- und Investmentbank.
- 1983 – Jyske Bank established an office in London and three years later upgraded it to a branch.
- 1984 – Jyske Bank established a representative office of Jyske Bank Private Banking in Fuengirola on the Spanish Costa del Sol.
- 1987 – Jyske Bank acquired Banco Galliano (est. 1855), a family-owned bank and the oldest bank in Gibraltar.
- 1987 – Jyske Bank acquired Hamburger Handelsbank (est. 1921), giving it a branch in Hamburg.
- 1988 – Jyske Bank converted its representative office in Spain into a subsidiary that it later converted back to a representative office.
- 2002 – Jyske bank formed a strategic alliance with Nykredit.
- 2003 – Jyske Bank established representative office for Jyske Bank Private Banking in Cannes, on the French Côte d'Azur.
- 2004 – Jyske Bank established a representative office in Poland to conduct private banking.
- 2004 – Jyske Bank acquired 60% of Berben's Effectenkantoor in Echt, Netherlands.
- 2007 – Jyske Bank Private Banking closed the offices in Warsaw and Fuengirola.
- 2008 – Jyske Bank closed its branch in London.
- 2014 – Jyske Bank sells Berben's Effectenkantoor.
- 2015 – Jyske Bank closes Jyske Bank Schweiz.
- 2020 – Jyske Bank sells Jyske Bank (Gibraltar) Ltd.
- 2022 – Jyske Bank confirm discussions on the acquisition of Handelsbanken Danish Operations.

== International branches ==
- Jyske Bank, Filiale, Hamburg (Germany).

== Controversies ==
Jyske Bank was mentioned in the Panama Papers and the bank was used by Sergei Pugachev for money laundering. In 2018 the Danish Financial Supervisory Authority criticised the bank for insufficient measures to prevent money laundering.

== See also ==
- List of banks in Denmark
