= Banco Galliano =

Coordinates: 36.142691°N 5.353321°W

A.L. Galliano Bankers
- Industry: Banking
- Founded: Gibraltar (1855)
- Founder: Antonio Luis Galliano
- Defunct: 1997
- Fate: Acquired
- Successor: Jyske Bank
- Headquarters: Main Street, Gibraltar
- Area served: Gibraltar
- Key people: Francis Galliano

Banco Galliano was the oldest bank in the British overseas territory of Gibraltar.

== History ==
In 1855, Antonio Luis Galliano (1803–1866) and his family, immigrants from Genoa via Cádiz, established A.L. Galliano Bankers in Gibraltar, better known as Banco Galliano in Spanish, or Galliano's Bank in English. This family-owned bank was Gibraltar's oldest bank, though it did not incorporate until August 1978. (Before that it was a partnership.) In 1987 Jyske Bank acquired Banco Galliano renaming it Jyske Bank (Gibraltar) Limited.

From the latter half of the 19th century, Galliano's bank started to face competition. The Anglo-Egyptian Bank (later Barclays) opened a branch in 1888, and Credit Foncier (later Crédit Agricole) entered in 1920. There were also, by the start of the 20th century, four other small, family-owned banks – Cuby Brothers, Benzecry (El Banquerito; established 1882), Rugeroni Brothers (established 1919), and Marrache and Sons – but by 1940 these had ceased operating.

A.L. Galliano Bankers survived the Great Depression, the Spanish Civil War, and both world wars, albeit with difficulty. Gibraltarian Francis (Paco) Galliano OBE, the last Galliano to own and run the bank, entered the bank in 1944 at the age of 17. He became a partner in 1953 and the senior partner in 1964. His son, Frank Galliano was General Manager until the takeover.

== Trivia ==
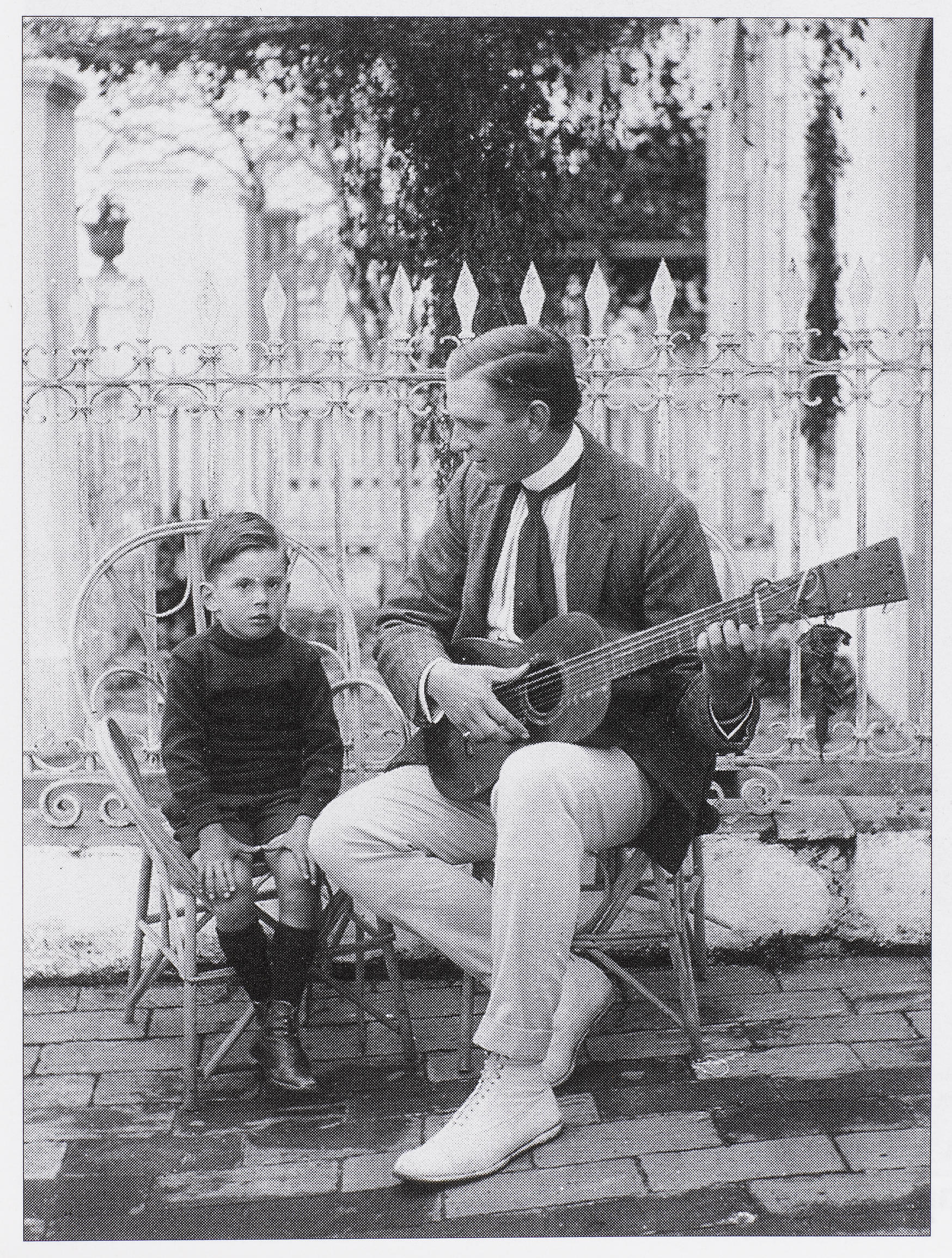
Andrew Galliano, ex Senior Partner, playing a Spanish guitar by Joséf Pagés.

In 1822, the spanish guitar-maker Joséf Pagés made a Spanish guitar that came to belong to members of the Galliano family. Paco Galliano sold it in 2008 for £6,600.

== Citations and references ==
Citations

References

- Galliano, Paco (2003). History of Galliano's Bank (1855 - 1987): The Smallest Bank in the World.
