= List of male bullfighters =

The following is a list of notable male bullfighters which includes bullfighters by country. The list of female bullfighters catalogues the spread of women in the sport.

== Colombia ==
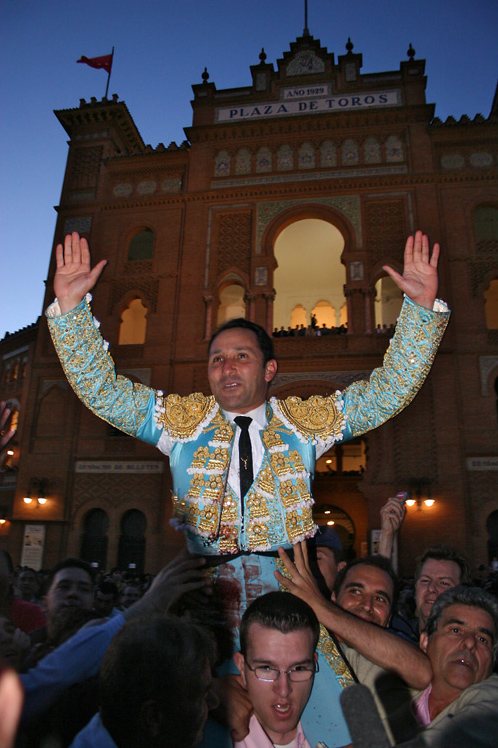
César Rincón

- Pepe Cáceres (1935–1987).
- Edgar García, El Dandy (1959/1960–2020).
- Henry Higgins (1944–1978).
- César Rincón (born 1965).

== France ==
- Sebastián Castella (born 1983).
- Thomás Cerqueira (born 1989).
- Clement Dubecq Clemente (born 1995).
- Jean Baptiste Jalabert Juan Bautista (born 1981).
- Steeven Jean Groux Leal Juan Leal (born 1992).
- Christian Montcouquiol, Nimeño II (1954–1991).
- Adrien Salenc (born 1997).

== Mexico ==
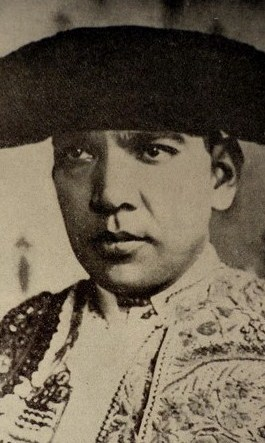
Rodolfo Gaona

- Alejandro Amaya
- Carlos Arruza El Ciclón
- Jaime Bravo
- Guillermo Capetillo
- Manuel Capetillo
- Manuel Capetillo hijo
- Eloy Cavazos
- José Flores Pepillo
- Rodolfo Gaona El Califa de León
- Ricardo Moreno El Estudiante
- Silverio Pérez El Faraón de Texcoco
- Luis Procuna El Berrendito de San Juan
- Leandro Quiroga Machaquito
- Carmelo Torres
- José Torres ''El Pajarito''

== Mozambique ==
- Ricardo Chibanga

== Peru ==
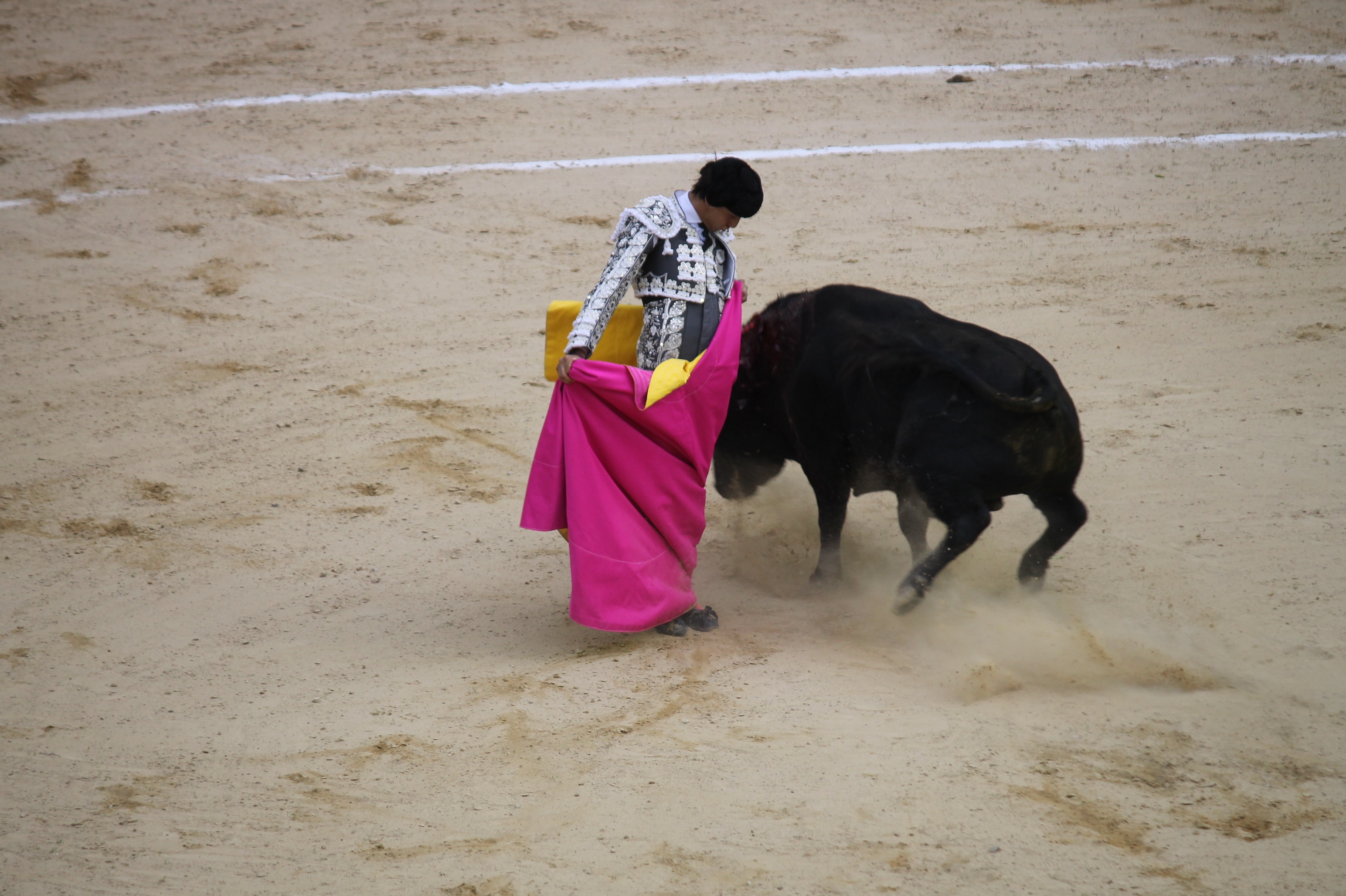
Andrés Roca Rey

- Raúl Acha (1920–2007).
- Joaquín Galdós (born 1995).
- Andrés Roca Rey (born 1996).
- Rafael Santa Cruz (1928–1991).

== Portugal ==
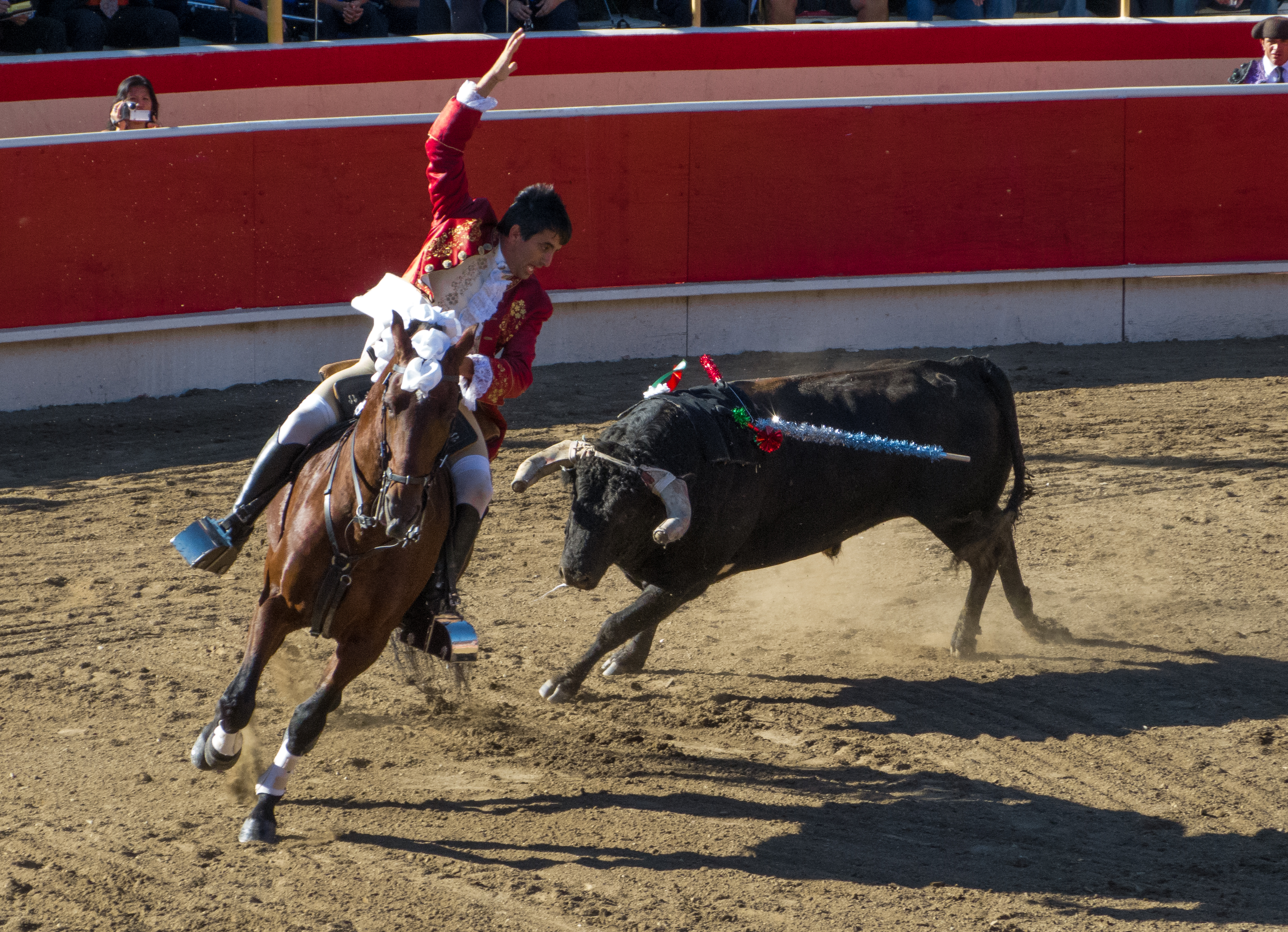
Luís Rouxinol

- Mário Coelho
- Manolo Dos Santos El Lobo
- José Falcão
- João Branco Núncio
- Luis Rouxinol
- José Júlio
- Mário Coelho

== Puerto Rico ==
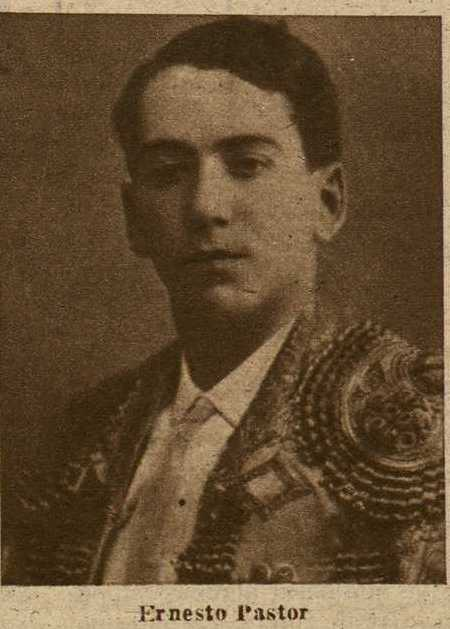
Ernesto Pastor

- Arturo Siemon Aparicio “El Pio”
- Ernesto Pastor (1892–1921)
- Gilberto Morales
- Isaac Olivo
- Juan Ramon Fernandez
- Pepito Algarin
- Wilfredo Morales

== Spain ==
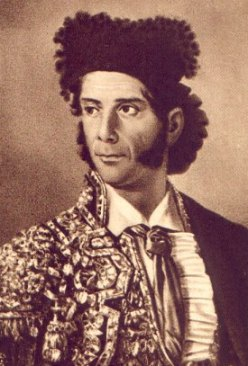
Francisco Montes Reina - Paquiro

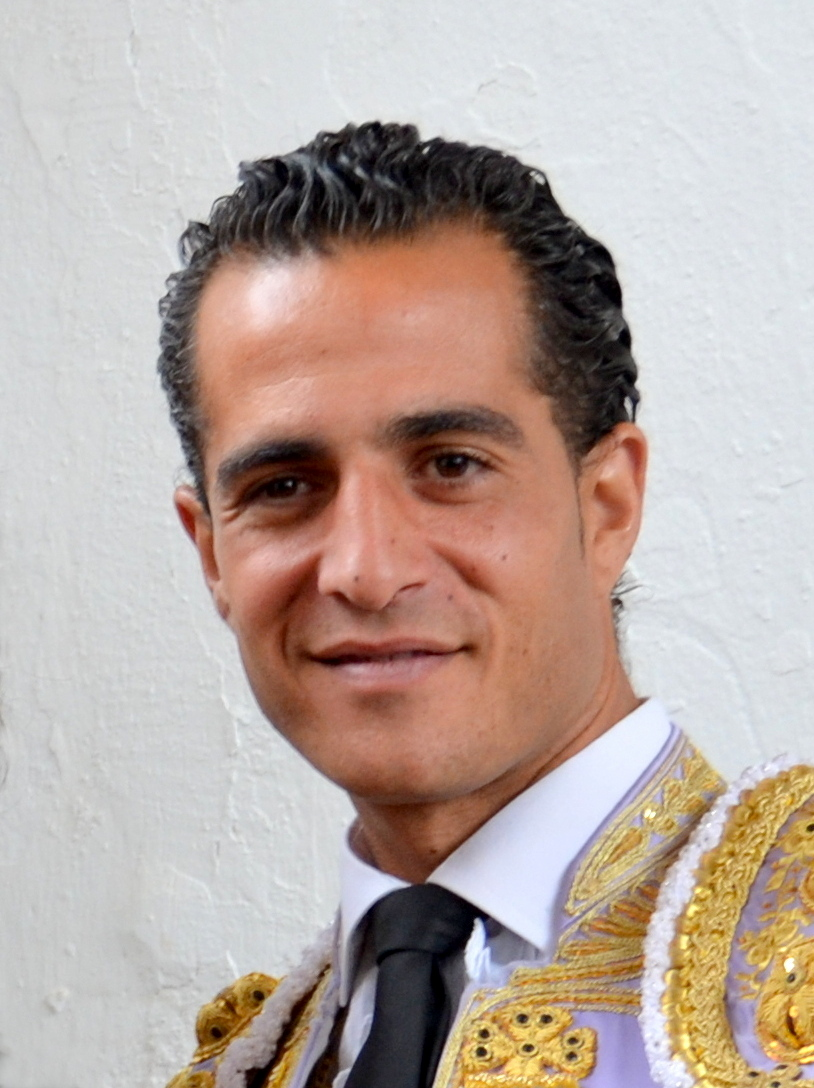
Iván Fandiño

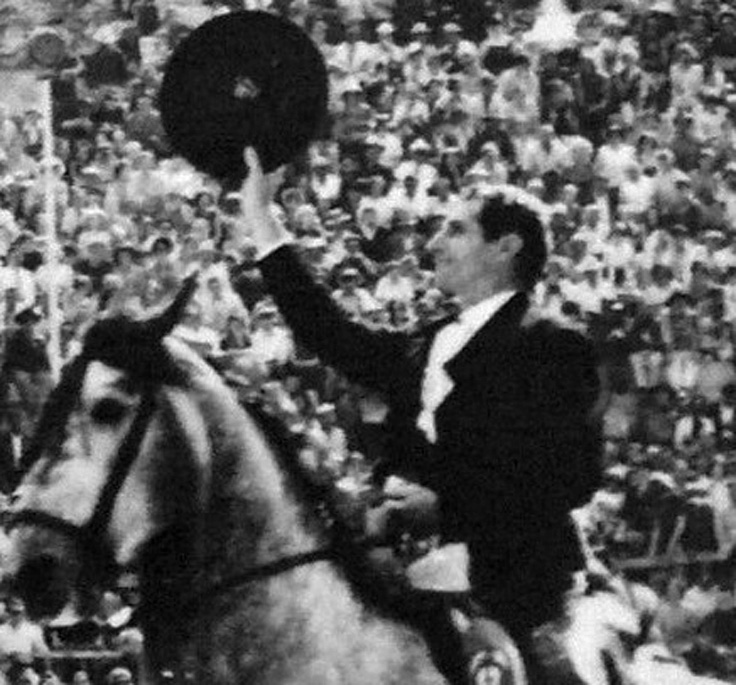
Ángel Peralta

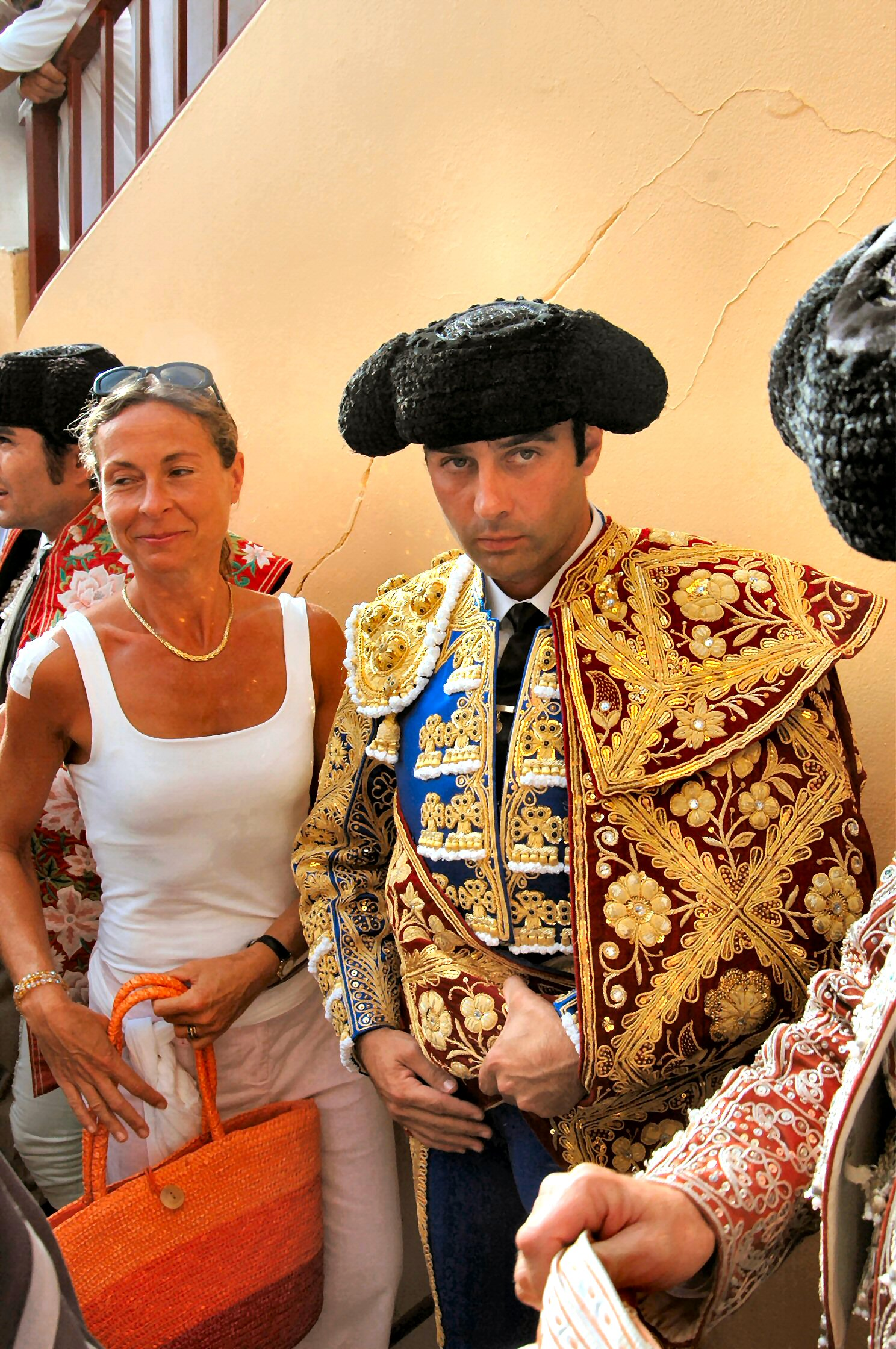
Enrique Ponce

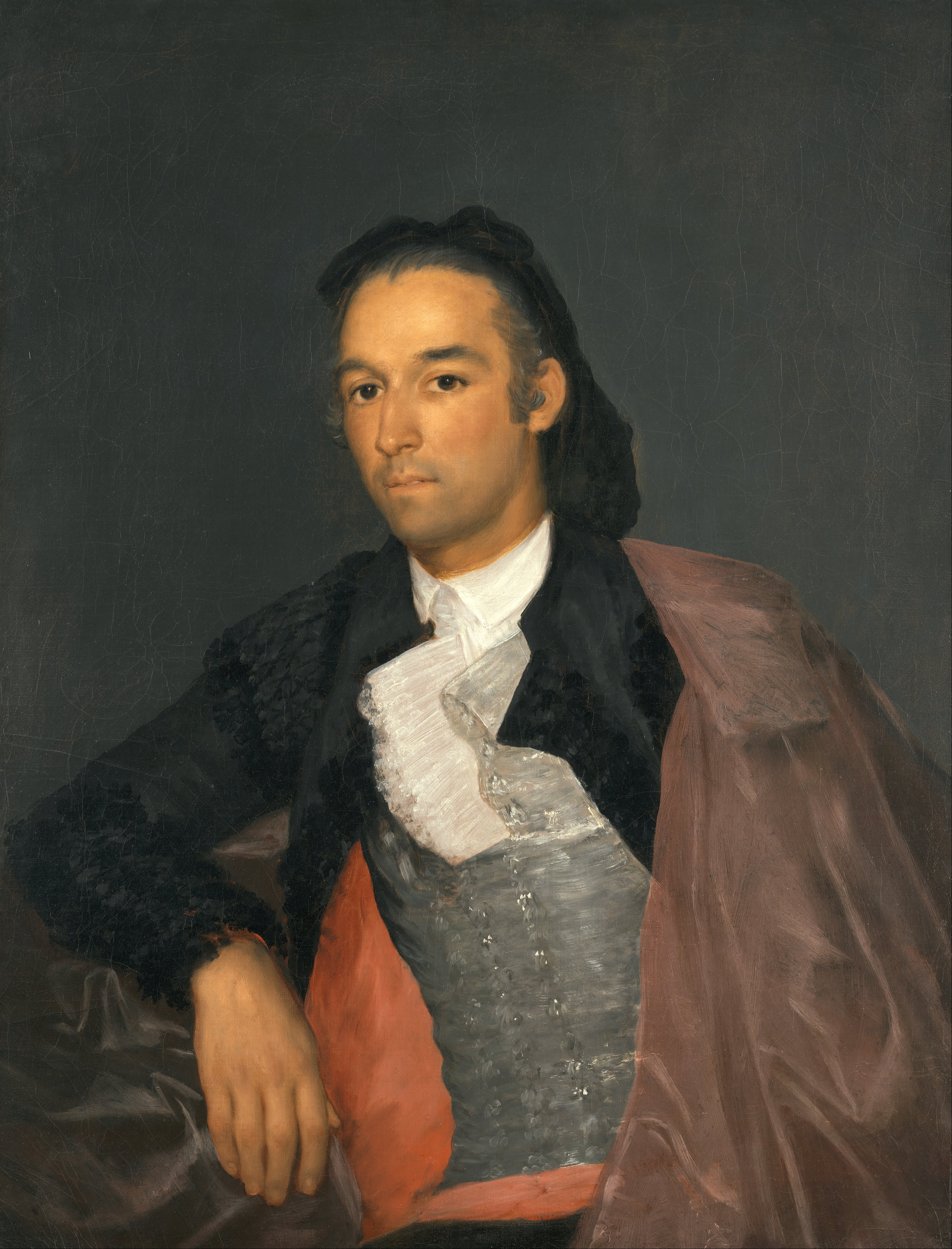
Pedro Romero, by Francisco Goya

- Félix Almagro (1907–1939)
- Julio Aparicio Díaz Julito Aparicio (born 1969)
- Julio Aparicio Martínez (born 1932)
- José Miguel Arroyo Delgado, Joselito (born 1969)
- Juan Belmonte, El Pasmo de Triana (1892–1962)
- Manuel Benítez Pérez, El Cordobés (born 1936)
- Alfonso Cela, Celita (1885–1932)
- Antonio Chenel Albadalejo, Antoñete (1932–2011)
- Javier Conde (born 1975)
- José Cubero Sánchez (1964–1985)
- Marcos de Celis (1932–2018)
- Manuel Díaz González, El Cordobés (born 1968)
- Luis Miguel González Lucas, Luis Miguel Dominguín (1926–1996)
- David Fandila Marín, El Fandi (born 1981)
- Iván Fandiño (1980–2017)
- José Gallego Mateo, Pepete III (1883–1910)
- Juan José García Corral (1952–2020)
- José Gómez Ortega, Joselito (1895–1920)
- Rafael Gómez Ortega, El Gallo (1882–1960)
- Dámaso González (1948–2017)
- Rafael Guerra Bejarano, Guerrita (1862–1941)
- Julián López Escobar, El Juli (born 1982)
- Pablo Lozano, La Muleta de Castilla (1932–2020)
- José Martínez Ahumada, Limeño (1936–2015)
- Jesús Martínez Barrios Morenito de Aranda (born 1985)
- Jairo Miguel (born 1993)
- Francisco Montes Reina, Paquiro (1804–1851)
- Emilio Muñoz El pequeño Mozart del toreo (born 1962)
- Manolo Navarro (1926–2020)
- Antonio Ordóñez (1932–1998)
- Cayetano Ordóñez Niño de la Palma (1904–1961)
- José Ortega Cano (born 1953)
- Jaime Ostos (1931–2022)
- Juan José Padilla Ciclón de Jerez (born 1973)
- Ángel Peralta Pineda, El Centauro de las Marismas (1926–2018)
- Enrique Ponce (born 1971)
- Cayetano Rivera Ordóñez (born 1977)
- Francisco Rivera Ordóñez (born 1974)
- Francisco Rivera Pérez, Paquirri (1948–1984)
- José Rivera Pérez, Riverita (1947–2021)
- Enrique Robles, Chicorrito
- Julio Robles (1951–2001)
- José Rodríguez Davié, Pepete II (1867–1899)
- Joaquín Rodríguez Ortega, Cagancho (1903–1984)
- Manuel Laureano Rodríguez Sánchez, Manolete (1917–1947)
- José Dámaso Rodríguez y Rodríguez, Pepete (1824–1862)
- Curro Romero (born 1933)
- José Ruiz Baos Calatraveño (1946–2022)
- Ignacio Sánchez Mejías (1891–1934)
- Ángel Teruel (1950–2021)
- Andrés Vázquez (1932–2022)
- Pepe Luis Vázquez Garcés (1921–2013)
- Pepe Luis Vázquez Silva (1957–2024)

== United States ==
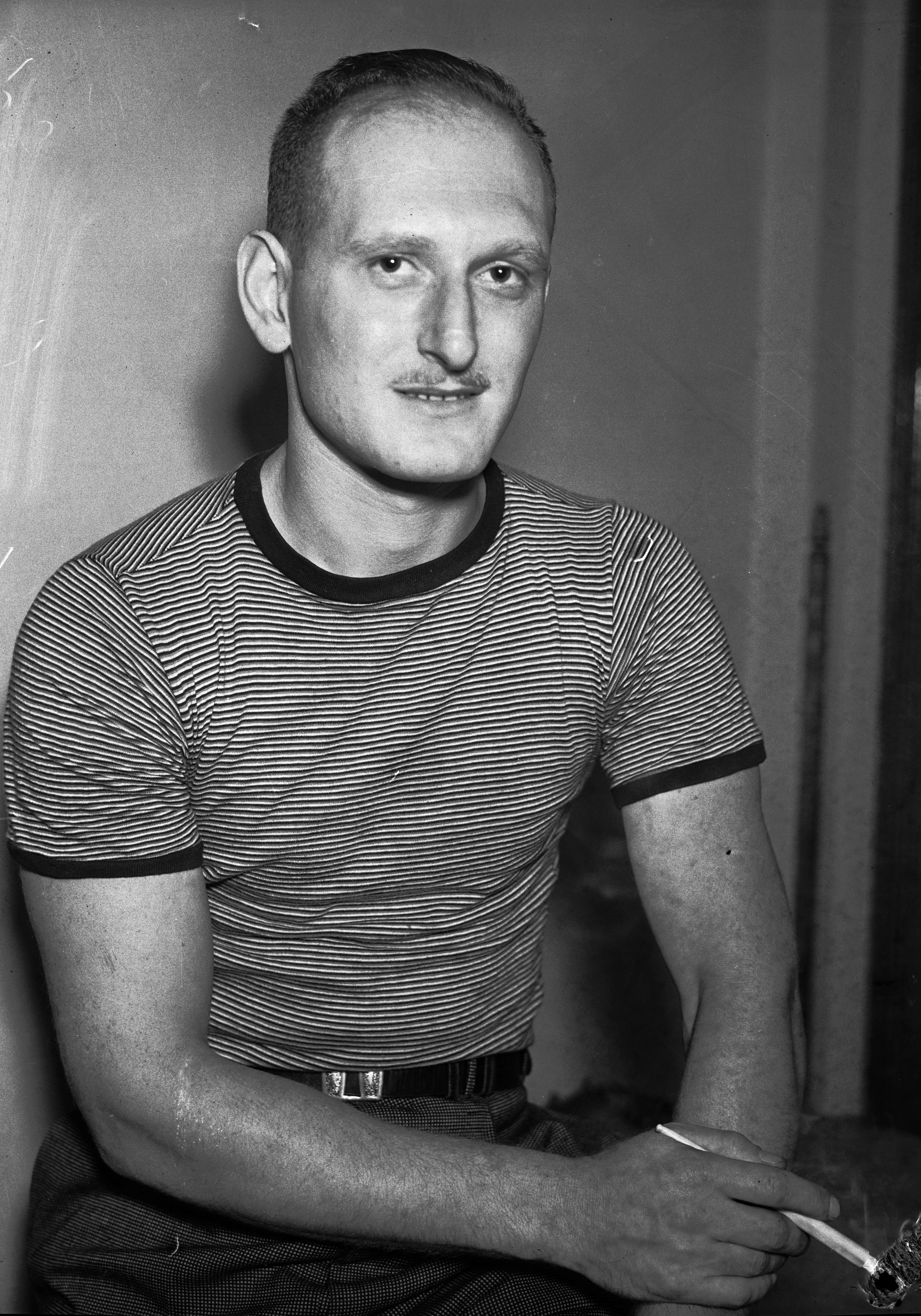
Sidney Franklin

- Baron Clements Jr. (born 1938)
- Sidney Franklin (1903–1976).
- John Fulton (1932–1998).
- David Renk El Texano (1963–2018).

== United Kingdom ==
Frank Evans

- Frank Evans
- Alexander Fiske-Harrison
- Henry Higgins

== Fictional bullfighters ==
Emile Stiebel as Escamillo in Carmen

- Escamillo, in Bizet's opera Carmen and the short story by Prosper Merimée on which it was based
- Don Flamenco, Spanish boxer and bullfighter in the video game Punch-Out!!
- Juan Gallardo, in Blood and Sand both the 1908 novel and several movies based on the novel
- Grampa Simpson, in The Simpsons episode "Million Dollar Abie"
- Lydia González, in 2002 Spanish drama film Talk to her by Pedro Almodovar
- Paco Pedro, regarded as the world's greatest matador and seducer, has appeared in three short films to date
- Raul Bourneau, minor character in Hortensia Papadat-Bengescu's classic novel Fecioarele despletite (The Disheveled Maidens)
- El Gargo, a bullfighter doppelgänger of Gargamel apperearing in The Smurfs’ episode "Papa Loses His Patience".
- Vega, one of the bosses in the video game Street Fighter
- El Primero, legendary but egotistical bullfighter who's the main antagonist in the movie Ferdinand
- Luis Montoya, retired, legendary Mexican bullfighter and antagonist in the television series Columbo, Season 5, Episode 4 "A Matter of Honor".

== See also ==
- List of female bullfighters
- Bullfighting
