= Pepete =

Pepete was the nickname of three Spanish matadors, all of whom died in the bullring.

- José Dámaso Rodríguez y Rodríguez (1824–1862)
- José Rodríguez Davié (1867–1899)
- José Gallego Mateo (1883–1910)
