= Spanish settlement of Puerto Rico =

Total population
- 2,676 Born in Spain (2010); 83,879; 2.1% Self-identified as Spaniard (2000)

Languages
- Spanish; English

Religion
- Predominantly Roman Catholicism & Large minority of Protestants

Related ethnic groups
- Spanish people; White Puerto Rican; Mediterranean

Spanish settlement of Puerto Rico (Spanish: Puertorriqueños españoles) began in the early 1500s continuing until 1898. Spanish settlement of Puerto Rico can be understood in two senses: ethnic Spanish settlement and Spanish colonial settlement – this article covers both.

The most significant Spanish immigration wave occurred during the colonial period, continuing with smaller numbers arriving during the 20th century to the present day. The Spanish heritage in Puerto Rico is palpable today in its customs and many traditions, language, and in the old and new architectural designs.

== Landing and first settlement ==
On 25 September 1493, Christopher Columbus set sail on his second voyage with 17 ships and 1,200–1,500 men from Cádiz, Spain. On 19 November 1493 he landed on the island, naming it San Juan Bautista in honor of Saint John the Baptist.

The first Spanish settlement, Caparra, was founded on 8 August 1508 by Juan Ponce de León, a lieutenant under Columbus, who later became the first governor of the island. Vicente Yáñez Pinzón is considered the first appointed governor of Puerto Rico, but he never arrived on the island.The following year the settlement was abandoned in favor of a nearby islet on the coast, named Borinquen, which had a suitable harbor. In 1511, a second settlement, San Germán, was established in the southwestern part of the island. During the 1520s the island took the name of Puerto Rico while the port became San Juan.

== Spanish administration ==
As Spain cemented their authority in the American continents, they established the Viceroyalties of New Spain and Peru in 1535 and 1542, respectively. Puerto Rico, and other Spanish colonial possessions in the West Indies fell under the administration of New Spain. Though the viceroys were the ultimate representatives of the monarchy, authority was often delegated to the regional governors. In periphery territories, such as Puerto Rico, the viceroy rarely intervened in local governance with regards to minor appointments, judicial matters, and other clerical duties of administration. In the case of Puerto Rico, the governor also carried the title of captain general, meaning they were simultaneously military commanders and territorial administrators.

Though the colonies were afforded a small degree of autonomy in local affairs, the Spanish crown still retained a high level of control. The crown, with the assistance of The Council of the Indies, approved the yearly budgets, most appointments, fleet and military allocations, among other facets.

Puerto Rico was targeted by various privateers and pirates over the course of Spanish rule due to the island's strategic location and because it was one of the first ports established by the Spanish. To protect against attacks, the Spanish constructed an impressive set of defensive walls around San Juan, most of which are intact today. In 1598, the city was unsuccessfully sieged by Francis Drake in the Battle of San Juan.

The island had previously been inhabited by the Taíno people. Following Spanish colonization, the Taíno population declined dramatically as a result of introduced diseases, forced labor under the encomienda system, warfare, and other colonial-era disruptions. Many surviving Taínos were also absorbed into the emerging mixed population through intermarriage and assimilation. By 1514, an official survey found that approximately 40% of Spanish men had Indigenous wives, reflecting the extensive intermarriage between Spanish settlers and Taíno women during the early colonial period. As the Indigenous population declined, the Spanish increasingly relied on enslaved Africans as a source of labor. The importation of enslaved people from Africa contributed to the development of Puerto Rico's colonial economy and facilitated the expansion of plantation agriculture, including sugar production. Despite the profitability of sugar and the widespread exploitation seen on many other Caribbean colonies, Puerto Rico did not become a major exporter of sugar; this can be seen through the island's demographics which, in 1765, only 11.2% of the island's populace was African, a very low ratio as Jose Monge writes.

Puerto Rico was elevated by the Spanish Constitution of 1812 from a colony to a province, affording the island more rights and later granting the island seats in the Spanish legislature.

== Spanish settler waves, 1500–1898 ==
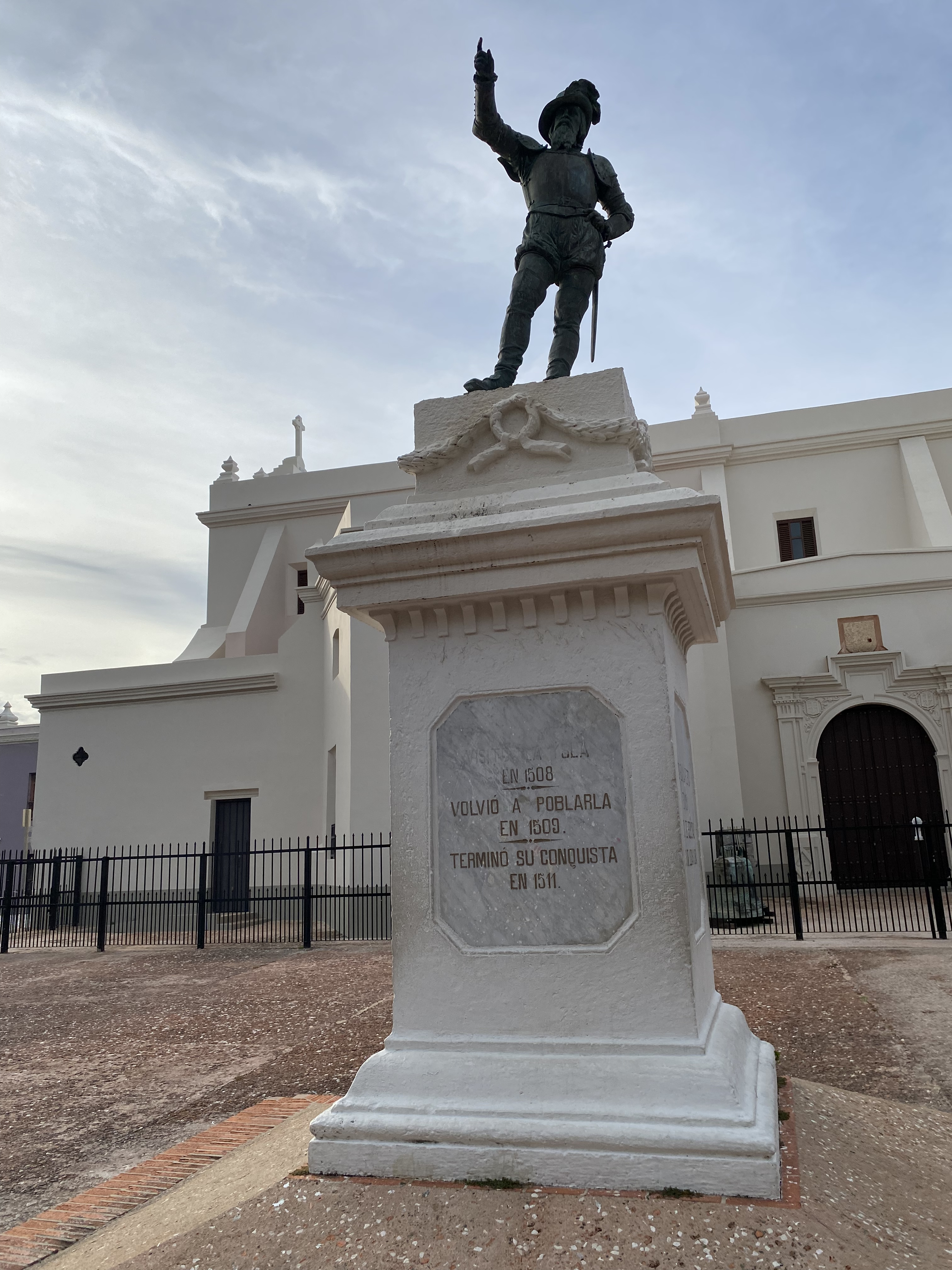
Bronze statue of explorer Juan Ponce de León in Plaza de San José, San Juan.

From the start of the conquest of Puerto Rico, Castilians ruled over the religious (Catholicism) and political life. Some came to the island for just a few years and then returned to Spain. However, many stayed.

Among Puerto Rico's founding families were the Castilian Ponce de León family. Their home was built in 1521 by Ponce de Leon but he died in the same year, leaving "La Casa Blanca", or "The White House", to his young son Luis Ponce de León. The original structure didn't last long; two years after its construction a hurricane destroyed it and it was rebuilt by Ponce de León's son-in-law Juan García Troche. The descendants of Ponce de León's family lived in La Casa Blanca for more than 250 years when in 1779 the Spanish Army took control of it. Finally, the American military moved into La Casa Blanca in 1898. The southern city of Ponce is named after Juan Ponce de León y Loayza, the great-grandson of the island's first governor.

The Spanish heritage of Puerto Ricans comes from the many regions of Spain (including Canary Islanders, Asturians, Catalans, Majorcans, Galicians, Castilians, Andalusians, and Basques)

=== Canarian migration ===
The first wave of Canarian migration to Puerto Rico seems to be in 1695, followed by others in 1714, 1720, 1731, and 1797. The number of Canarians that immigrated to Puerto Rico in the first three centuries of Iberian rule is not known to any degree of precision. Still and all, Dr. Estela Cifre de Loubriel and other scholars of the Canarian migration to America, such as Dr. Manuel González Hernández of the University of La Laguna, Tenerife, agree that they formed the bulk of the Jíbaro, or peasant stock, of the mountainous interior of the island.

The Isleños increased their commercial traffic and immigration to the two remaining Spanish colonies in America, Puerto Rico and Cuba. Even after the Spanish–American War of 1898, Canarian immigration to the Americas continued. Successive waves of Canarian immigration continued to arrive in Puerto Rico, where entire villages were founded by relocated islanders. In the 1860s, Canarian immigration to America took place at the rate of over 2,000 per year, at a time when the total island population was 237,036. In the two-year period 1885–1886, more than 4,500 Canarians emigrated to Spanish possessions, with only 150 to Puerto Rico. Between 1891 and 1895 Canarian immigrants to Puerto Rico numbered 600. These are official figures; when illegal or concealed emigration is taken into account, the numbers would be much larger.

=== Immigration to Puerto Rico: 1800–1898 ===
Immigration to the island caused the population to grow rapidly during the 19th century. In 1800, the population was 155,426 and the century ended with almost one million inhabitants (953,243), multiplying the population by about six times. The major impetus for the massive European immigration during the 1800s was the Spanish Crown's proclamation of the Royal Decree of Graces of 1815 (Real Cédula de Gracias), which led to the arrival of primarily Catholic immigrants from some seventy-four countries. Included were hundreds of Corsican, French, Irish, German, Scottish, Italian, Lebanese, Maltese, Dutch, English and Portuguese families moving to the island. Some countries were represented by only a few immigrants, e.g., fifty-one Chinese immigrants during this century. The country that still sent the most people was Spain.

From the start of colonization other groups from Andalusia, Catalonia, Asturias, Galicia, and Majorca had also immigrated, although the Canarian people formed the basis. Once the 19th century came, things changed drastically. According to Puerto Rican scholar Dr. Estela Cifre de Loubriel, who did extensive research publishing books on distinct immigration patterns to the island, during the 19th century the greatest number of Spaniards that came to the island with large families were Catalans and Mallorcans.

Spanish business ownership in the late 19th Century
City / Municipality San Juan
Asturians	26%
Basques	24%
Galicians	17%
Mallorcans	12%
Catalans	10%
Canary Islanders, Castilians; Valencians, Andalusians; Santanderinos	10%
Others	1%
Total	100%
City / Municipality Mayagüez / Ponce
Catalans	Majority
French, Corsicans, Italians, Germans	Minority

The next regions with the largest number of immigrants were Galicia and Asturias, followed by the Canary Islands, the Basque Country and Andalusia. The Catalans, Galicians, Mallorcans, and Asturians typically arrived with large extended whole families. There were regions of the island that attracted some immigrants more than others which was mainly due to political or economic reasons.

=== Areas of settlement ===
Many Catalans, Mallorcans and Galicians joined the population of the interior, the west and the southern coast of the island (along with large numbers of Corsicans) because of their independent personalities and their desire to stay away from the San Juan area which was dominated by the Spanish. They felt more comfortable by maintaining some distance from San Juan. However, Asturians, Basques, Galicians and Castilians stayed in the capital and owned several businesses, such as banking, coffee and tobacco industry in the surrounding area. In the case of Ponce and Mayagüez the business ownership was dominated by Catalans, with other immigrant groups (see table) such as French, Italians and Germans being represented.

== 20th and 21st centuries ==
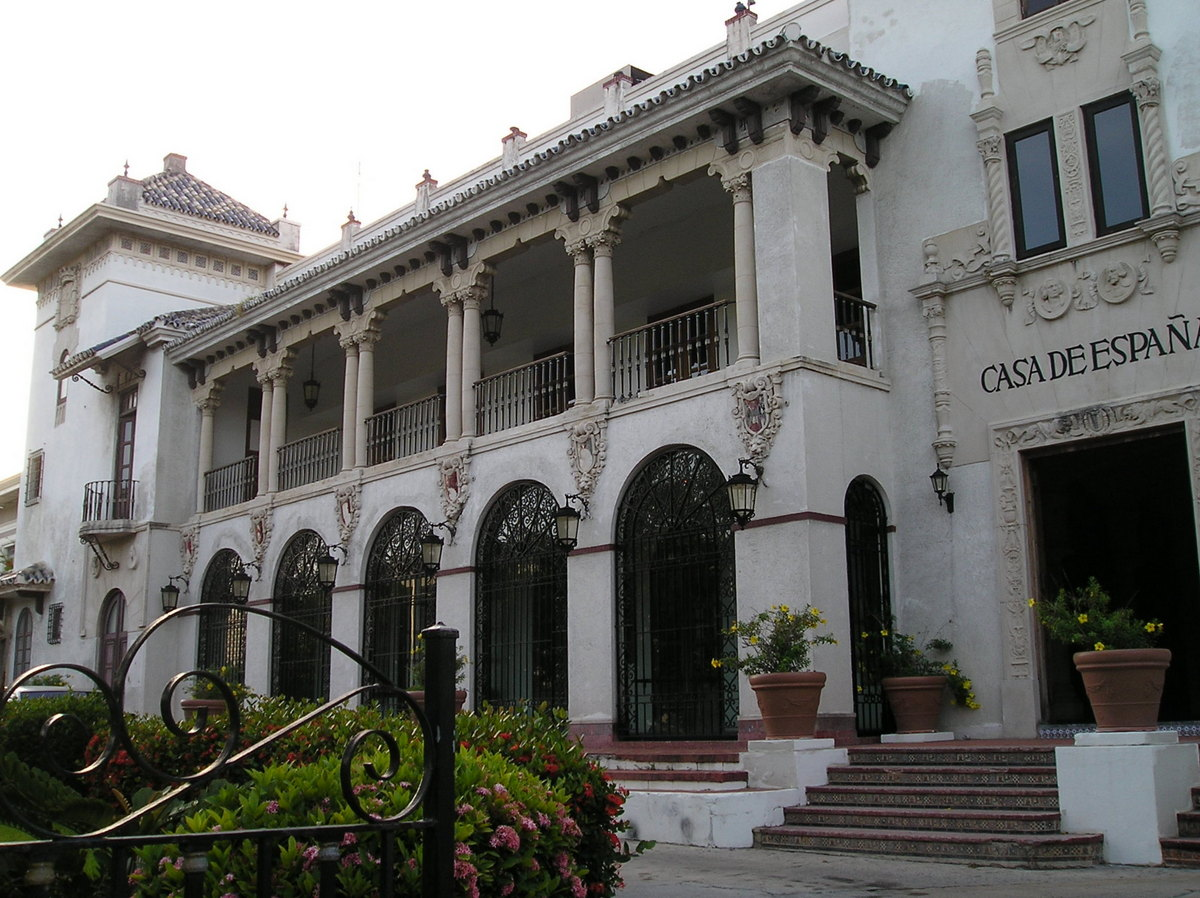
Casa de España in Old San Juan (built in 1934) is the headquarters and social organization for those of Spanish heritage.

After 1898, although many left, the majority decided to stay. While they continued to be an influence, their numbers however, continued to steadily decline under the occupation of the United States. In 1897 a year before the US invasion, there were 19,686 Spanish-born which fell to 7,690 in the census of 1899. This trend continued into the following decades of the early twentieth century but with less intensity. For example, in 1910 there were 6,630 Spaniards which dropped to 4,975 in 1920. Even with these numbers, they still formed a majority of the total immigrant population with 56.5% and 60.9%. Immigration flows slowed because of laws by the United States government but large flows continued to other countries such as Argentina, Brazil, Cuba and Mexico which offered more opportunities. The majority of Spaniards lived in San Juan.

Foreign-born population in Puerto Rico
Year	Total	% of total	% of foreign-born (born in Spain)	Population (born in Spain)
1897	24,700	-	79.7	19,686
1899	13,872	1.5	55.45	7,690
1910	11,766	1.1	56.5	6,630
1920	8,167	0.6	60.9	4,975
1930	6,017	0.4	59.75	3,595
1940	5,039	0.3	50.25	2,532
1950	8,453	0.4	27.8	2,351
1960	10,224	0.4	25.0	2,558
1970	80,627	3.0	5.1	4,120
1980	70,768	2.2	7.35	5,200
1990	79,804	2.3	5.7	4,579
2000	109,581	2.9	3.5	3,800
2010	105,593	-	-	2,676
Source:1897

Note: Data in table excludes those born in the United States.

In 2009, there were 520 Galician-born people in Puerto Rico.

== Language ==
Spanish is the predominant language inherited from the Spaniards among Puerto Ricans residing in the island; however, its vocabulary has expanded with many words and phrases coming from the English, Taíno, and African influences of the island. Since 1901, English is taught in both public and private schools.

The linguistic contributions of Canary Islanders are difficult to separate from those of Andalusia, given considerable similarities as well as the close linguistic and cultural contacts between Andalusia and the Canaries. For example, the endings -ado, -ido, -edo often drop intervocalic /d/ in both Seville and San Juan: hablado > hablao, vendido > vendío, dedo > deo (intervocalic /d/ dropping is quite widespread in coastal American dialects). Another Andalusian trait is the tendency to weaken postvocalic consonants, particularly /-s/: 'los dos > lo do, 'buscar' > buhcá(l). Pronouncing "l" instead of "r" at the ends of words ending in "r" is also a trait of Puerto Rican Spanish that has its origin in southern Spain.

Canarian Spanish also made a contribution to Puerto Rican Spanish as many Canarios came in hopes of establishing a better life in the Americas. Most Puerto Rican immigration in the early 19th century involved Canary Islands natives who, like Puerto Ricans, had inherited most of their linguistic traits from Andalusia. Canarian influence is most present in the language of those Puerto Ricans who live in the central mountain region, who blended it with the remnant vocabulary of the Taíno. Canarian and Caribbean dialects share a similar intonation which, in general terms, means that stressed vowels are usually quite long. Puerto Rican and Canarian Spanish are strikingly similar. When visiting Tenerife or Gran Canaria, Puerto Ricans are usually taken at first hearing for fellow Canarians from a distant part of the Canarian archipelago.

== Religion ==
The Catholic Church has been historically the dominant religious institution in Puerto Rico. The first diocese in the Americas was erected in Puerto Rico in 1511. All municipalities in Puerto Rico have at least one Catholic church (building), most of which are located at the town center or "plaza". Protestantism, which was suppressed under the Spanish regime, has been encouraged under American rule, making modern Puerto Rico interconfessional.

On 8 August 1511, Pope Julius II created two dioceses in La Española (Santo Domingo and Concepción de la Vega) and a third in the principal city of Puerto Rico, the bishops of which were all suffragans of the archbishopric of Seville. The Canon of Salamanca, Alonso Manso, born in Palencia, was appointed bishop of the Puerto Rican diocese and took possession in 1513 — the first bishop to arrive in America. The Island at that time had two Spanish settlements with 200 white inhabitants and 500 Christian aborigines.

The Catholic Church in Puerto Rico is part of the worldwide Catholic Church, under the spiritual leadership of the Pope in Rome.

=== Present ===
Presently, Catholics constitute 75% of the island's total population while adherents of Protestant, Pentecostal Christianity, Islam, Judaism, and animists make up the remaining 25%.

== Cultural influences ==
Spanish influence is the most notable of all cultural influences in Puerto Rican culture. Spanish heritage has left a mark on the island, and signs of this cultural exchange can be found everywhere, from the official language, Spanish architecture, musical genres to the local culinary styles.

=== Art ===
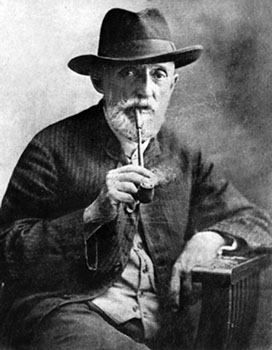
Francisco Oller.

Francisco Oller was a Puerto Rican visual artist. Oller is the only Latin American painter to have played a role in the development of Impressionism. He was the third of four children of aristocratic and wealthy Spanish parents.

=== Bullfighting ===
Bullfighting was performed although it never became popular on the island. It was mainly performed in larger cities such as San Juan and Ponce. Be that as it may, it did have a short-lived rebirth in the 1950s and 1960s with bullfighting events performed in the Estadio Francisco Montaner as late as 1967, with others held in the Hiram Bithorn Stadium and Estadio Sixto Escobar in San Juan. The first Puerto Rican bullfighter was Ernesto Pastor, the other being Juan Ramón Fernandez.

=== Cockfighting ===
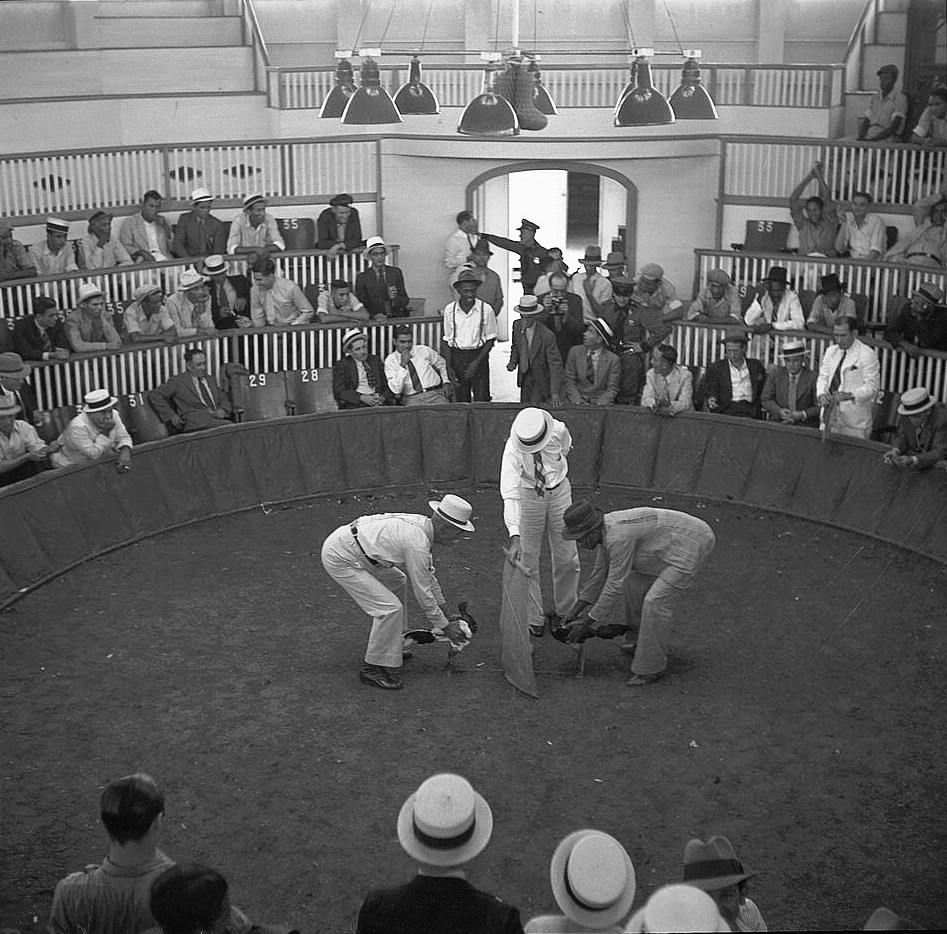
Cockfighting club in Puerto Rico, 1937.

Cockfighting is a tradition dating back more than five centuries ago with it being legal in Spain's Canary Islands, a major influence on Puerto Rico. There is a cockfighting arena in every major town or city. Cockfighting had been legal in Puerto Rico since 1933 but in 2019, cockfighting was made illegal by the United States administration.

=== Cuisine ===
Arguably considered to be the Puerto Rican unofficial national dish, arroz con pollo, or "rice with chicken", is supposedly native to Puerto Rico. The dish has roots in the motherland of Spain. Arroz con pollo dates back to the eighth century when the Moors occupied Spain and influenced the way they imported and exported goods along with the way they ate. Among the other foodstuffs introduced by the Spaniards were beef, pork (chorizo), rice, wheat, and olive oil. Caldo gallego is a dish imported from Spain's northwestern province of Galicia.

=== National anthem ===
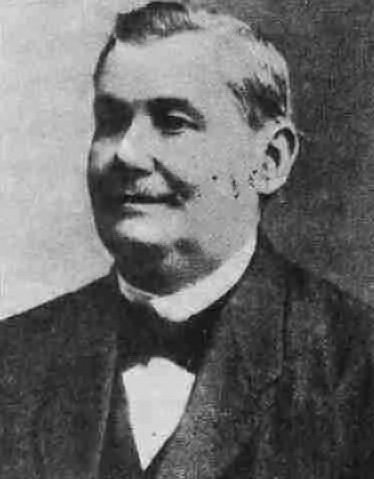
Manuel Fernández Juncos wrote the official lyrics in 1903.

La Borinqueña is the national anthem of the Commonwealth of Puerto Rico. Two Spaniards, Félix Astol Artés and Manuel Fernández Juncos, wrote the official music (1867) and lyrics (1903) to the anthem. Astol Artés adapted the music of an earlier tune, "Bellísima Trigueña", while Fernández Juncos changed the lyrics to the piece in the early years of the 20th century, supposedly to suppress any zeal for political independence among the Puerto Rican people. This change in the anthem's lyrics was in reaction to the revolutionary lyrics penned by Lola Rodríguez de Tió, patriot and poet, at the time of El Grito de Lares in September 1868, the most important uprising against Spanish colonial rule in the history of Puerto Rico.

=== Official beverage ===
The world-famous piña colada is the official beverage of Puerto Rico since 1978. One claim to the creation of the piña colada was that in 1963 when Don Ramón Portas Mingot, a Spaniard, with a plaque in San Juan commemorating his creation of the beverage in La Barrachina, a restaurant bar.

=== Rum producers ===
Sebastián Serrallés was a wealthy Spaniard from Girona, Catalonia, who settled in Ponce in the mid-1830s and bought a small plot of land known as Hacienda "La Teresa". Eventually, Sebastián Serrallés left Puerto Rico for Barcelona and turned over the management of the growing estate to his Puerto Rico-born son Don Juan Serrallés Colón. In 1865, Juan Serrallés Colón (1845–1921) founded Destilería Serrallés, a rum producer located in Ponce, Puerto Rico, known for its Don Q (from Don Quixote) rum brand. Don Q is one of several rums made in the island archipelago. Five-generations on, it is still run by the Serrallés family over a century after its founding.

== Spanish surnames ==
There are approximately 1,700 surnames in existence in Puerto Rico. Of these, the majority are of Spanish origin. After these, the most common ones are Corsican (Italian origin) with 8%. The remainder are of various origins. Thus, most surnames in Puerto Rico originated in Spain, with Puerto Ricans following the Spanish tradition of using two surnames. The first surname is inherited from the father's first surname and the second is inherited from the mother's first surname (maiden name).

The most common Puerto Rican surnames in 2014 (compared to the top surnames in Spain) are as follows:

Rank	Name	Number	Country of origin	Spain (2015)
1	Rivera	153,304	Castilian, Spain	García
2	Rodríguez	118,311	Spain	González
3	Torres	68,586	first found in Castile, Spain	Rodríguez
4	González	67,431	Spain	Fernandez
5	Ortiz	60,908	Spain	López
6	Santiago	59,685	first found in Galicia, Spain	Martínez
7	Pérez	59,223	Spain	Sánchez
8	Colón	50,132	Spain	Pérez
9	López	49,724	Spain	Gómez
10	Díaz	43,962	Spain	Martín

== Notable people ==
=== Entertainment ===
- Kany García
- Ricky Martin

=== Governors ===
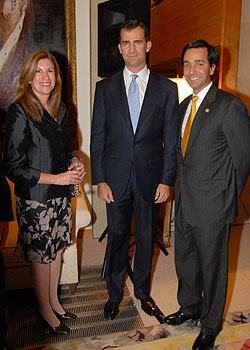
Felipe VI of Spain and Fortuño with his wife.

Most of the Governors of Puerto Rico have had Spanish ancestry, although the extent of Spanish heritage varies. Later ancestry can often be traced to ancestors from other nations in Europe. They come from many regions within Spain, for example, at least three governors have origins in the Balearic Islands. The first person Governor to officially occupy the position was Spanish conquistador Juan Ponce de León in 1508.

- Jesús T. Piñero, 1946–1949: (Canarian) descent.

1949 to present

- Luis Muñoz Marín - Palencia roots.
- Roberto Sánchez Vilella
- Luis A. Ferré Aguayo - Catalan.
- Carlos Romero Barceló - Balearic Islander descent.
- Pedro Rosselló González - Balearic Islander.
- Sila María Calderón Serra - Balearic Islander.
- Aníbal Acevedo Vilá
- Luis Fortuño Burset - Catalan.
- Alejandro García Padilla - Asturian.
- Ricardo Rosselló Nevares - Balearic Islander.

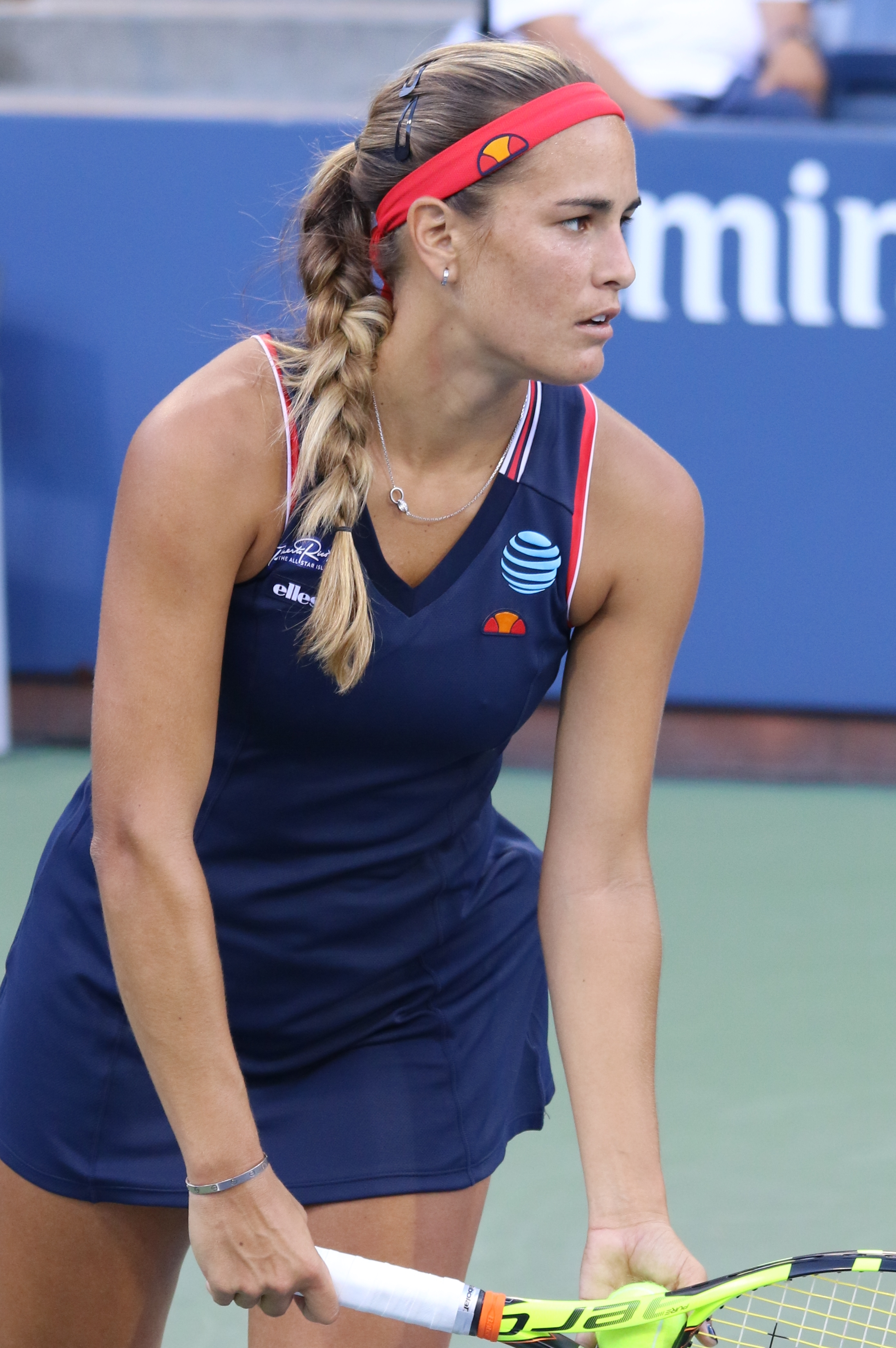
Monica Puig in 2016.

=== Military ===
- Ángel Rivero Méndez

=== Models ===
- Mariana Vicente

=== Poets ===
- Luis Lloréns Torres

=== Sport ===
- Monica Puig of Catalan descent.

== Place names ==
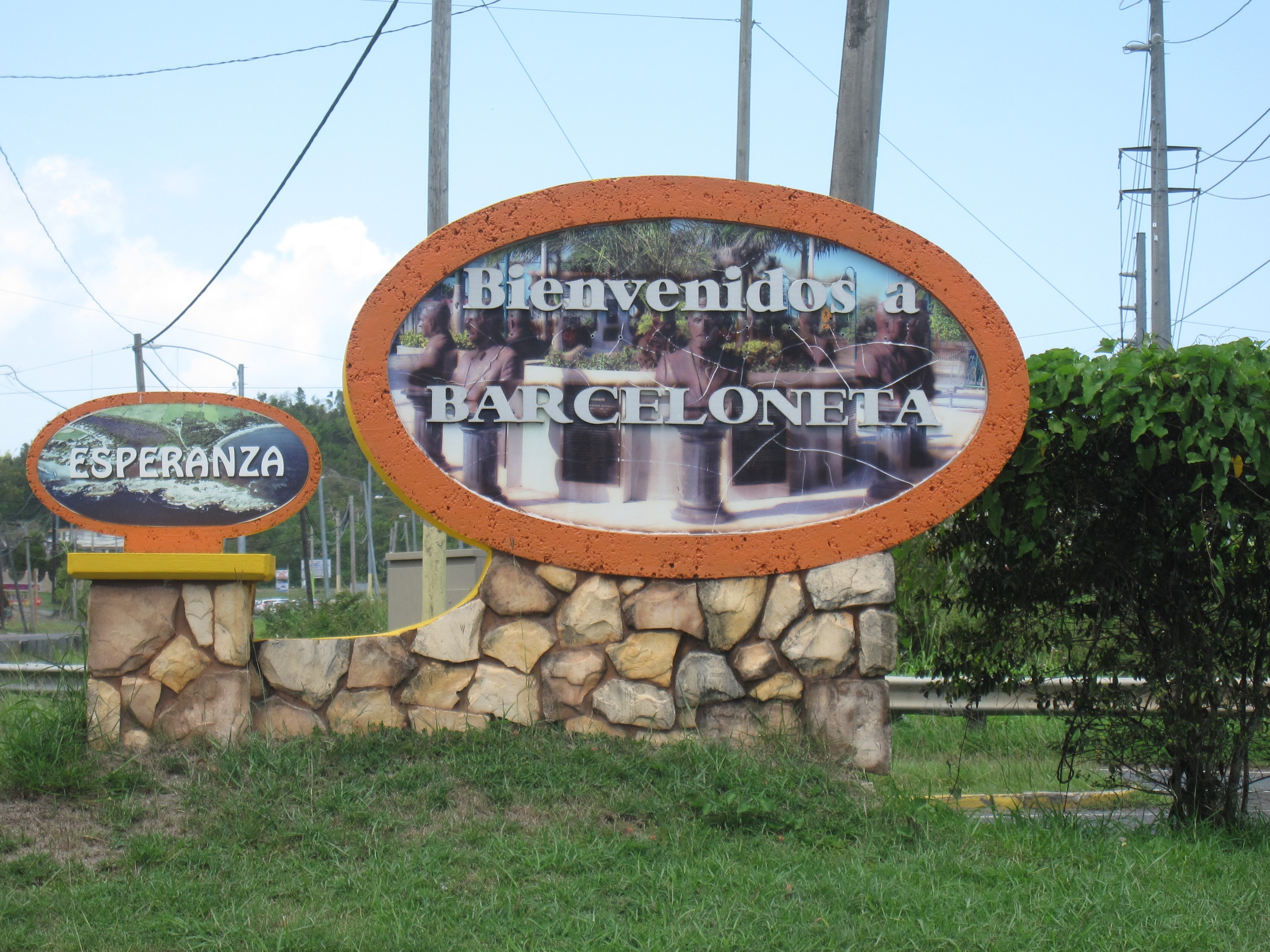
Barceloneta named after Barcelona.

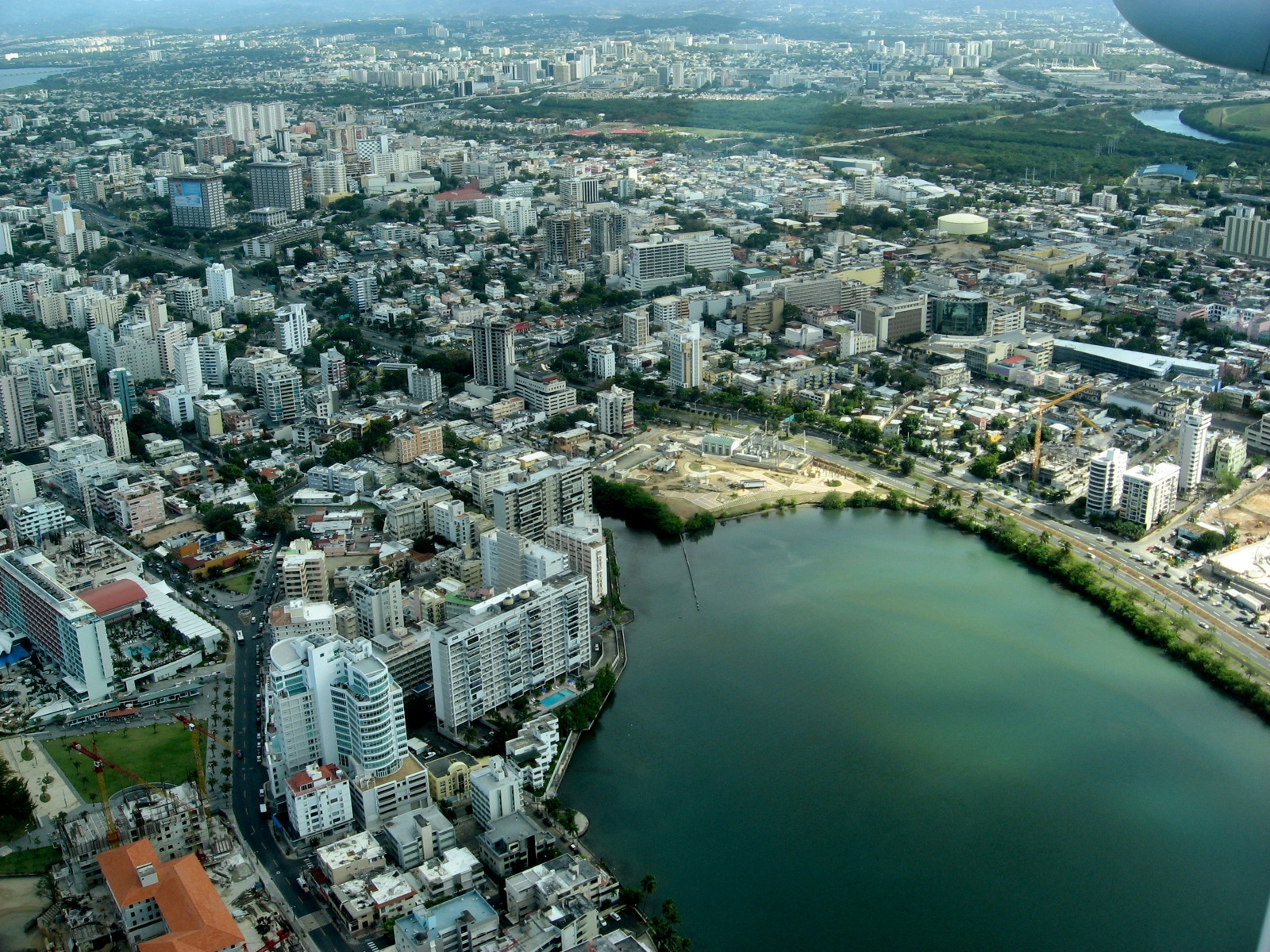
Santurce district of the city of San Juan, derives its name indirectly from Santurtzi, Basque Country.

There are many places in Puerto Rico named after places in Spain or have Spanish names due to the centuries of Spanish colonialism, Spanish settlers and explorers.

By municipality:

- Añasco – named after the Spaniard Don Luis de Añasco from Extremadura;
- Arroyo
- Barceloneta – founded by the Catalan Don Bonocio Llenza Feliú and named after the Barcelona district of La Barceloneta or the city itself;
- Cataño – founded in 1927 by Hernando De Cataño
- Isabela – named for Queen Isabela of Castile in 1819
- Ponce – named for Juan Ponce de León y Loayza of the Ponce de León family
- Rincón – "Corner", founded by Don Luis de Añasco;
- San Juan – from "Saint John the Baptist"
- San Germán – named after the queen consort of Aragon and second wife of Ferdinand II of Aragon, whom he married in 1506 after the death of his first wife, Isabella I of Castile.
- San Sebastián – named after a resort town on the Bay of Biscay in northern Spain.
  - Santurce district – Pablo de Ubarri Capetillo was granted the title of 'Count of Santurce' (which is the Hispanicized equivalent of Santurtzi) by the Spanish Crown. With his newly acquired title and influence, the district was renamed after his title.
- Vieques
  - Isabel Segunda – the "town of Vieques", named after Queen Isabel II of Spain.

== See also ==
- Cultural diversity in Puerto Rico
- List of Puerto Ricans
- Puerto Ricans
- Spaniards
- Spanish immigration to Cuba
- European Puerto Ricans
- Spanish Americans
