= Marcos de Celis =

Spanish bullfighter (1932–2018)

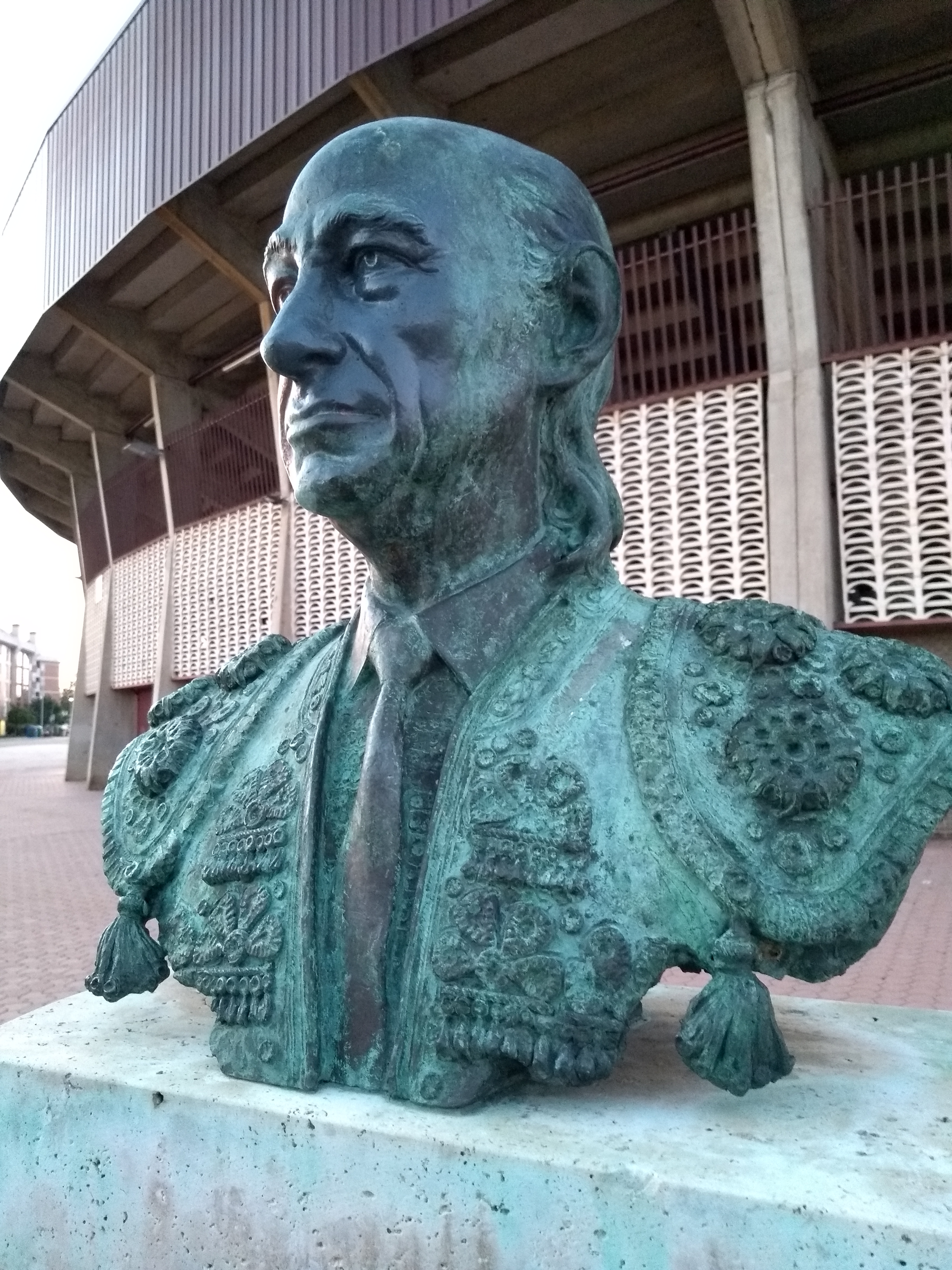
- Born: 23 March 1932; Villamoronta, Spain
- Died: 27 May 2018 (aged 86); Palencia, Spain
- Occupation: Bullfighter

Marcos de Celis Salvador (23 March 1932 – 27 May 2018) was a Spanish bullfighter.

== Biography ==
Born in the small town of Villamoronta, de Celis moved to Palencia when he was four years old. His career began in 1952 in Herrera de Pisuerga (Province of Palencia) and in 1955 he fought throughout Spain. Take the alternative on Sunday 18 March 1956 in the Plaza de Toros de Valencia, during Falles, by bullfighter Julio Aparicio Martínez handing him the tackle of killing and the bull "Espartero", in the presence of Antonio Ordóñez, and confirming it on 29 April in Madrid, fighting 30 corridas during that year. The following years were those of his consecration, having the habit of entering to kill without a crutch, or changing the same for a pañolillo or for the montera, but without arriving, for different reasons, to triumph fully as originally promised.

He married Luisa Gato on 10 December 1958.

He fought several times in Madrid and his greatest success was on 12 April 1959, when he came out of the big door.

In 1961 he left the ring and emigrated to Belgium to work in a mine for two years. On his return, he returned to fight, triumphing in his reappearance on 1 May 1964 in San Sebastian de los Reyes (Madrid). Subsequently, he only fought sporadically. His last run was in Palencia on 1 September 1972 at the Fairs and Festivals of San Antolín. In June 2006, on the occasion of the 50th anniversary of his alternative, he was paid a tribute in the Palencia Bullring, exposing several snapshots of the diestro and presenting a book about his life and art.

The City Council of Palencia agreed, in 2008, to dedicate the name of a street in a recently built area. In August 2009, the residents of his hometown placed a plaque in the place where the house he was born.

== See also ==
- List of bullfighters
