= Pablo Lozano =

Spanish bullfighter and cattle rancher (1932–2020)

Pablo Lozano Martín (29 August 1932 — 29 October 2020), commonly known as La Muleta de Castilla, was a Spanish bullfighter and fighting bull cattle rancher, owner of cattle raising Alcurrucén and "Hermanos Lozano".

== Biography ==
=== Career as bullfighter ===
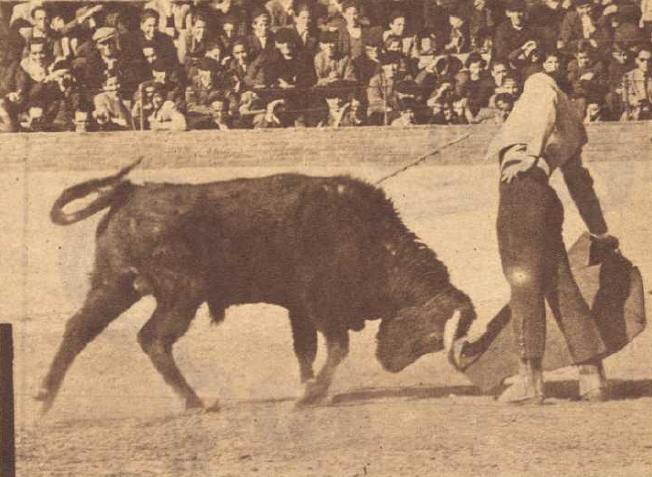
Lozano performing as a novillero in Mora in 1953. The original caption said that Lozano left this bull calf "without appendages" (that is, he was awarded both ears and the tail as trophies).

Lozano was born in Alameda de la Sagra, Province of Toledo, Spain in a wealthy Toledan family on 29 August 1932 and began in the world of bullfighting in the summer of 1949 and premiered on 26 August of that year in Orgaz's bullring while he was training as a novillero (novice bullfighter). He made his debut with picadors in the bullring of Mora, Toledo a month later, on 16 September 1949 and presented himself to the fans of Toledo a few days later, on 28 September, with a bullfight of the Eugenio Ortega bull-ranch, from Añover de Tajo. Lozano took the alternative on 25 September 1951 in La Monumental bullring in Barcelona with Luis Miguel Dominguín as godfather and Manuel González Cabello and José María Martorell as witnesses. La Vanguardia reported that day The young bullfighter toasted the audience and wasted his will throughout the course of a somewhat nervous muleta mane, ending with a jab without abandoning the steel and a whole volapié slightly detached. He confirmed his alternative in Las Ventas, Madrid on 18 May 1952.

He retired in 1963 to dedicate himself to other facets of the bullfighting world.

=== Career as cattle rancher and businessman ===
From the 1960s onwards, Pablo Lozano, together with his brothers, was in charge of the "Alcurrucén" cattle ranch. An agricultural exploitation, destined to the breeding of the fighting bull, which he bought in 1967 from the heirs of the Salamanca cattle breeder Juan Sánchez Tabernero and which, at present, graze between the provinces of Cáceres and Toledo. Likewise, at present this cattle farming is considered as one of the maximum exponents of the Encaste Núñez and has been a winner, on repeated occasions as one of the bravest cattle ranches of the San Isidro Fair in Madrid. Likewise, since 2006, he was one of the co-owners of the second cattle farming owned by the family, "Hermanos Lozano".

Pablo Lozano had an active career in the world of management and operation of bullrings in Spain and America. With his brothers, he was co-owner of the company Toresma II. In 1989, they were awarded by the Community of Madrid the exploitation of the Las Ventas bullring, where Pablo Lozano was especially in charge of the selection and contracting of cattle ranches. In 2002, they again won the tender for the awarding of the contract.

They managed the bullring until 2004 when the public tender was won by José Antonio Martínez Uranga and in 2006 the Supreme Court annulled the 2002 concession after being appealed by two businessmen.

He was one of the most representative managers ("apoderados") of the sector, managing the professional careers of some important bullfighters such as Curro Romero, Palomo Linares, Juan Antonio Ruiz «Espartaco», César Rincón, Manuel Caballero (torero), Vicente Barrera Simó, Eugenio de Mora, Sebastián Castella, José María Manzanares (the elder and the younger) and in his last years of Álvaro Lorenzo.

== "Pablo Lozano" pasodoble ==
As a result of his success as a bullfighter in the 1950s, Lozano even had his own pasodoble, dedicated to him by the composer Lázaro Nájera. A composition, prepared for band, which ran with the instrumentation for this type of musical formation by Santiago Berzosa.

== Personal life and death ==
Pablo Lozano was widowed when his wife, with whom he had three children: Pablo, Luis Manuel and Fernando, died in April 2008. The first two sons are also bullfighters and manage bullrings such as the Toledo's.

He died on 29 October 2020, at the age of 88, in Madrid from COVID-19 during the COVID-19 pandemic in Spain.
