= Jairo Miguel =

Jairo Miguel (born Jairo Miguel Sanchez Alonso, March 5, 1993) is a bullfighter child prodigy.

Miguel first began practicing bullfighting at the young age of six. He was signed to professionally fight bulls at the age of 12 in Mexico, because he could not compete in Spain, whose minimum age is 16. In 2007, he was severely gored by a bull and nearly lost his life.

On February 6, 2010, Miguel achieved the unusual feat of killing six bulls in one afternoon, an achievement regarded by experts as "extremely rare" for a 16-year-old. On his fear upon facing six bulls and the risk that it entails, Miguel had said: "Of course there are some nerves. Death is always there in bullfighting. But I am physically and mentally prepared for this.”

== See also ==
- Bullfighting
- List of bullfighters
