= Rafael Molina Sánchez =

Spanish bullfighter (1841–1900)

Rafael Molina Sánchez, "Lagartijo "

Rafael Molina Sánchez (November 27, 1841 – August 1, 1900), called Lagartijo (lizard), was a Spanish bullfighter.

== Early life ==
Rafael Molina was born in Córdoba on November 27, 1841.

== Career ==
On September 29, 1865, Lagartijo became a full bullfighter (he took the alternativa) at Úbeda. His sponsor (padrino) was Antonio Carmona y Luque, called El Gordito; Lagartijo killed Carabuco, a bull from the ranch (ganadería) owned by the Marchioness of Ontiveros.

During his career he was seriously gored seven times.

In 1887, Lagartijo presented his sword at the alternativa of Rafael Guerra Bejarano, marking Guerra's elevation from an apprentice to a professional matador. A Spanish hand fan commemorating the occasion survives in the collection of the Staten Island Historical Society at Historic Richmond Town in New York.

Lagartijo retired from bullfighting in 1893.

== Death ==
Rafael Molina died on August 1, 1900, in Córdoba.
