= Dámaso González =

- Born: Dámaso González Carrasco; 11 September 1948; Albacete, Spain
- Died: 26 August 2017 (aged 68); Madrid, Spain
- Occupation: Bullfighter (Torero)
- Years active: 1967–2003

Dámaso González Carrasco (11 September 1948 – 26 August 2017) was a Spanish bullfighter.

== Biography ==
=== Beginnings ===
Coming from a family of cattlemen, he began to participate in diverse capeas in La Mancha until in 1965, when he appeared in the part of a comic-taurino-musical spectacle.

He dressed for the first time on 27 August 1966 in a smaller celebration in Albacete in which he acted like outstanding of sword.

On 10 August 1967 he participated in a calf in Alcalá of Júcar (Albacete), leaving on shoulders of the Square. Mondéjar Photo

=== Death ===
He died on 26 August 2017 from pancreatic cancer.

== Career ==
=== Novillero ===
He began his career as novillero in 1967 acting in many of the towns of Spain under the nickname of "Curro de Alba".

In 1969 he obtained important successes. On 19 March of that year he appeared in the La Monumental de Barcelona cutting four ears and a tail, which served to be announced another seven evenings in the same city. On 1 June he debuted in Las Ventas of Madrid leaving a pleasing impression, in spite of its failures at the time of killing.

=== Bullfighter ===
He received the alternative in Alicante (Spain) on 24 June 1969 with Miguel Mateo Salcedo, "Miguelín" as godfather and Paquirri as witness.

After participating in twenty-four races for Spanish lands, he marched to America, where he obtained, among other trophies, the "San Sebastián de Oro" awarded to the winner of the San Cristóbal (Venezuela) fair.

In 1978 it happened to fight sixty-five festejos, obtaining important successes in places of first category. That winter also made the paseíllo in diverse occasions in lands Mexican.

The 25 May 1979 achieved in Las Ventas of Madrid one of the most important successes of its race when cutting the two ears to a bull of the cattle ranch of La Laguna, so he went out by the big door. Another important triumph was obtained by cutting three ears on July 30 in Valencia, one of the most important squares in the matador's career. He was second in the bullfight with sixty-nine performances to his credit.

It was first of the escalade in 1980, year in which it intervened in seventy runs. He especially emphasized the task of 9 August in Alicante, where he obtained four ears.

On 21 May 1981 left on the shoulders of the sector of Las Ventas for the second time in its race, after cutting an ear to each one of the cattle of Torrestrella that it fled. Two ears also cut in Valencia on 2 August of that same year in which he ended sixty-two festivities bullfighting in Spain. After that, he also fought in Peru, Colombia, Venezuela and Ecuador, highlighting the four ears he cut in Cali.

==== Seasons 1982-1986 ====
In 1982 he fought on fifty-five occasions. Some of its greater triumphs obtained them in Santander, where it cut four ears and a tail, and in Salamanca bullring, where it cut three ears.

Among the forty-one races that he fought in 1983, triumphs such as the ones obtained in the run of Asprona in Albacete (three ears) and in Santander (three ears) stood out. As in previous seasons, he also fought in Peru and Colombia.

==== Season 1994 ====
The season of 1994 was announced as the official farewell of the arena of Dámaso González. At first it was expected that had retired the previous year but, due to the triumphs obtained and to the heat of the public, extended his race one year more in spite of not being in the best physical conditions.

He announced his return to the ring for the season of 2003, when the "diestro" was fifty-four years old. He managed to cut an ear in Valencia during the Fallas on 15 March. He finally bowed out from the Plaza de Albacete on 16 September while sharing the billing with Espartaco and José Mari Manzanares, cutting an ear from his last bull; a day later made his last paseíllo in Murcia.

On 18 February 2019 he received the Medalla de Oro al Mérito en las Bellas Artes.

== See also ==
- List of bullfighters
