= Alejandro Amaya =

Mexican matador (born 1977)

Alejandro Hank Amaya (born 2 August 1977, in Tijuana) is a Mexican matador.

Amaya grew up in Tijuana, Baja California, México, and was educated in the United States. He is of German and Spanish descent. In 2006, ESPN did a special story about Amaya, entitled Haunted By The Horns.

Amaya took his alternativa in Jaén, Spain, on October 18, 2001, at the Feria of San Lucas. His Padrino was Enrique Ponce. His Testigo was "El Juli", with bulls from the ranch of Jandilla. During his alternativa, Amaya received an 8 cm goring, although he finished the bull and was awarded an ear. He took his confirmación in Plaza México, on November 24, 2002.
