= Alfonso Cela =

Spanish-Galician bullfighter (1885–1932)

Celita
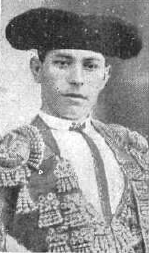
- Celita circa 1914
- Born: Alfonso Cela Vieito; July 11, 1885; Láncara, Lugo, Spain
- Died: February 26, 1932 (aged 46); Madrid, Spain

Alfonso Cela Vieito, known as Celita (July 11, 1885 – February 26, 1932), was a Spanish-Galician bullfighter. He is the only Galician to ever become a professional bullfighter.

== Biography ==
Celita was born in Carracedo, a small village in Láncara, Galicia, a region in the northwest of Spain. He moved to Madrid after the death of his father in 1896.

He began his career as a novillero (a bullfighter who only faces calves) in 1906 and took his alternativa (ceremony in which novilleros graduate to matador) in the bullfighting ring of A Coruña on 15 September 1912.

His brother Claudio and nephew Alfonso Cela Martín (known as Cela II) were bullfighters as well but never reached professional level.

== See also ==
- List of bullfighters
