= John Fulton (bullfighter) =

American matador

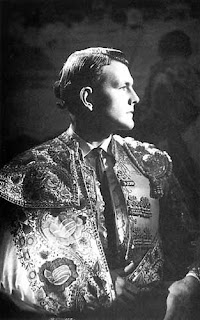
- Born: Fulton John Short; May 25, 1932; Philadelphia, Pennsylvania, U.S.
- Died: February 20, 1998 (aged 65); Seville, Spain
- Occupations: Matador, painter
- Known for: First American matador to take the alternativa in Spain
- Children: 1 (adopted)

John Fulton (25 May 1932 ― 20 February 1998) was an American bullfighter and visual artist who settled in Seville.

== Early life and education ==
Fulton was born into a working-class family in Philadelphia, Pennsylvania. His father was of Italian descent, originally bearing the surname Sciocchetti, which was later Anglicized to Short. Fascinated by Spanish culture from a young age, Fulton was particularly inspired by the 1941 film Blood and Sand and Ernest Hemingway's Death in the Afternoon.

He studied at the Philadelphia Museum College of Art and later received a scholarship to the Instituto Allende in San Miguel de Allende, Mexico, where he trained as both an artist and bullfighter.

== Bullfighting career ==
Fulton trained under Mexican matadors such as Luis Procuna and Pepe Ortiz. While serving in the U.S. Army, he continued fighting in novice bullfights (novilladas) in Mexican border towns. After his discharge in 1956, he moved to Seville, Spain, to pursue a professional career. In 1953, he killed his first calf in San Miguel de Allende, a city located in the Mexican state of Guanajuato.

He arrived in Algeciras, Province of Cádiz in 1956. He faced significant challenges as a foreigner in the closed world of Spanish bullfighting but gradually gained experience. He was mentored by legendary matadors Juan Belmonte and Rafael "El Gallo".

On July 18, 1963, Fulton took the alternativa in La Maestranza's bullring in Sevilla on 18 July 1963, being sponsored by José María Montilla and César Franco as a witness. He later confirmed it in Madrid’s Plaza Las Ventas in 1967, becoming one of only two Americans to do so.

He shared poster with well-known figures such as El Cordobés, Antonio Ordóñez and Pepe Luis Vázquez.

He continued fighting through the 1970s, particularly in Andalusia and Mexico. Though never a top-ranked matador, he earned widespread respect for his skill and perseverance.

== Artistic career ==
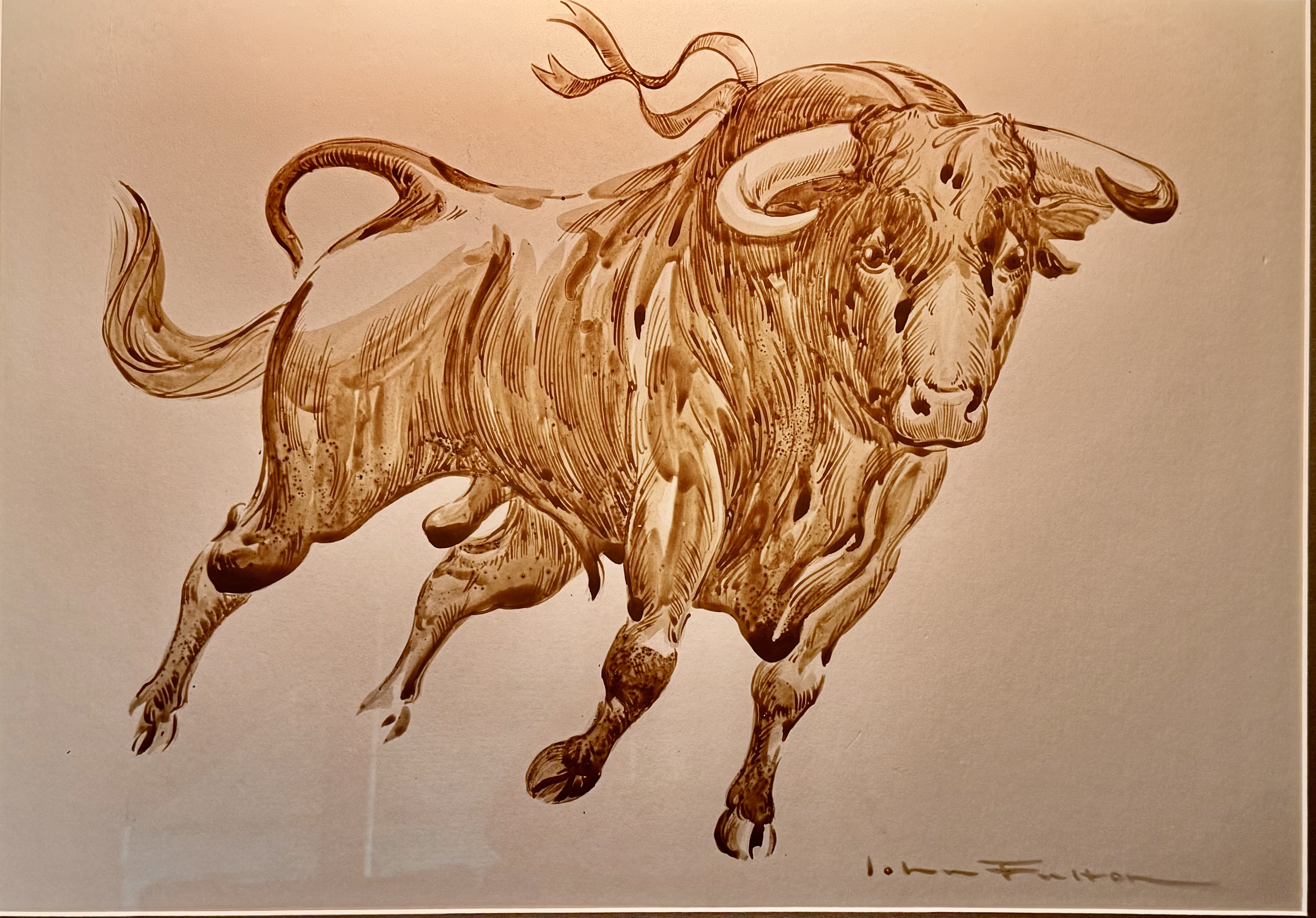
Painting of a bull, painted using the blood of a bull killed in bullfighting by John Fulton

Parallel to bullfighting, Fulton maintained a prolific art career. His preferred medium was bull’s blood, which he used to create monochromatic images of bulls and bullfighters. Critics praised these works for their originality and emotional impact.

He also illustrated several books, including James A. Michener’s Miracle in Seville and Robert Vavra’s Little Egret and Toro. In 1964, he published Lament for the Death of a Matador, a limited-edition art book inspired by Federico García Lorca.

== Later life ==
Fulton retired from bullfighting in 1994 with a final appearance in San Miguel de Allende, where he ceremoniously cut his coleta. He spent his later years painting, mentoring young bullfighters, and managing his gallery in Seville’s Santa Cruz district.

== Personal life ==
Fulton never married but maintained a large social circle of artists, writers, and fellow toreros. In the 1970s, he adopted a Roma boy named Federico, whom he raised as his son. Fulton also mentored Colombia’s Vicente Salamanca and Japan’s first matador, Atsuhiro Shimoyama.

== Death ==
He died of a heart attack in Seville on February 20, 1998, after two weeks in a coma. His funeral was attended by artists, matadors, and friends. A portion of his ashes was reportedly scattered in the Maestranza bullring.

== Legacy ==
Fulton is remembered as a cultural bridge between the United States and Spain. His career demonstrated that foreign-born bullfighters could earn a place in the Spanish tradition. His artwork remains influential among aficionados of both bullfighting and taurine art.

== See also ==
- List of bullfighters
