= Luís Rouxinol =

Luis Rouxinol
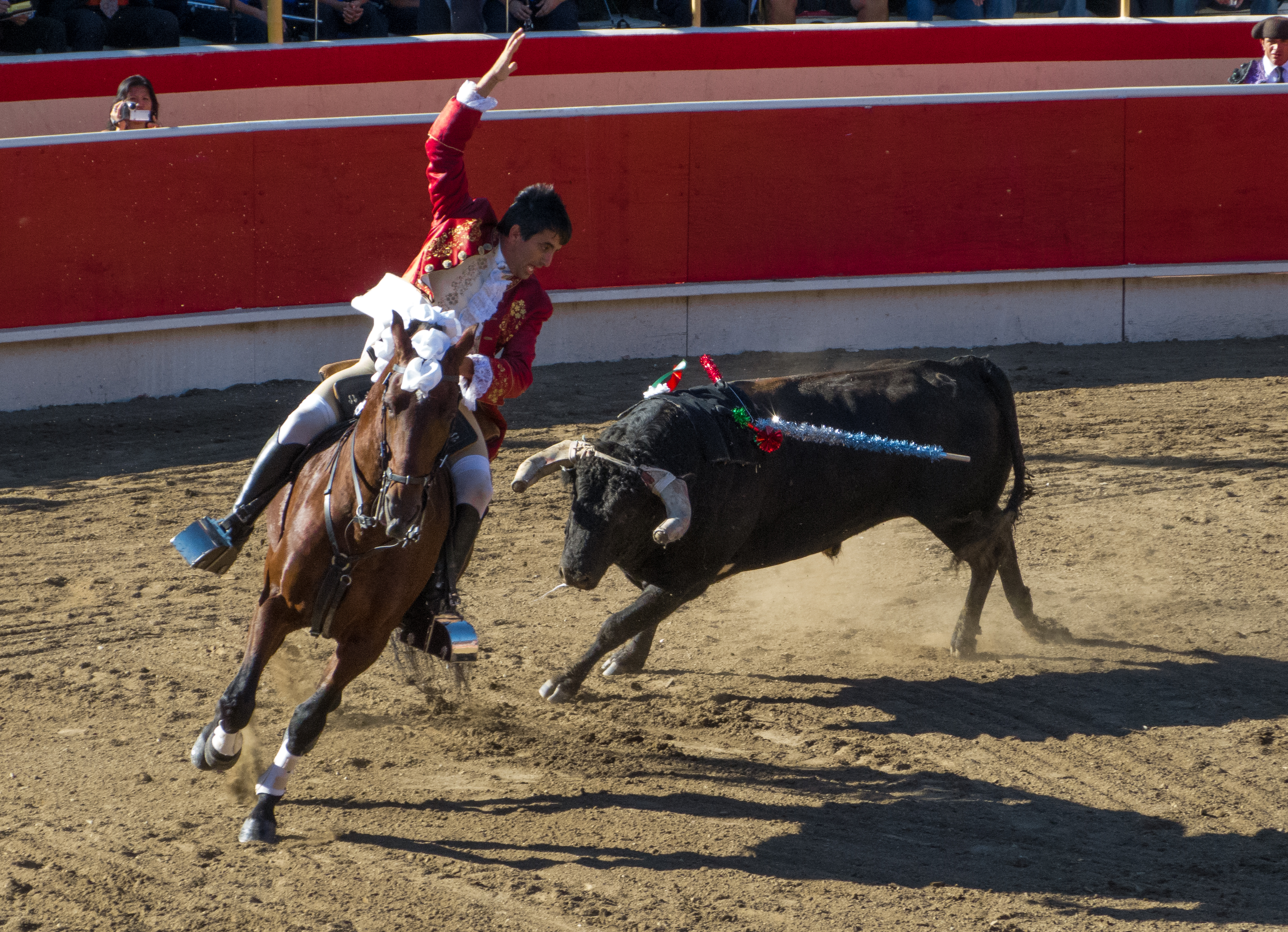
- Rouxinol in 2012

Personal information
- Nickname(s): Cyclops of Jerez, The Pirate
- Born: 8 August 1968 (age 57) Pegões, Montijo, Portugal

Sport
- Sport: Bullfighting
- Rank: Matador

Luis Rouxinol (born 8 August 1968) is a top bullfighter in Portugal and averages around 40–60 bullfights a year. He was born in Pegões, Montijo, with João Moura as his godfather. He received his alternativa, becoming a professional bullfighter, on 10 June 1987 in Santarém.

== See also ==
- Portuguese-style bullfighting
- List of bullfighters
