= José Miguel Arroyo Delgado =

Spanish bullfighter (born 1969)

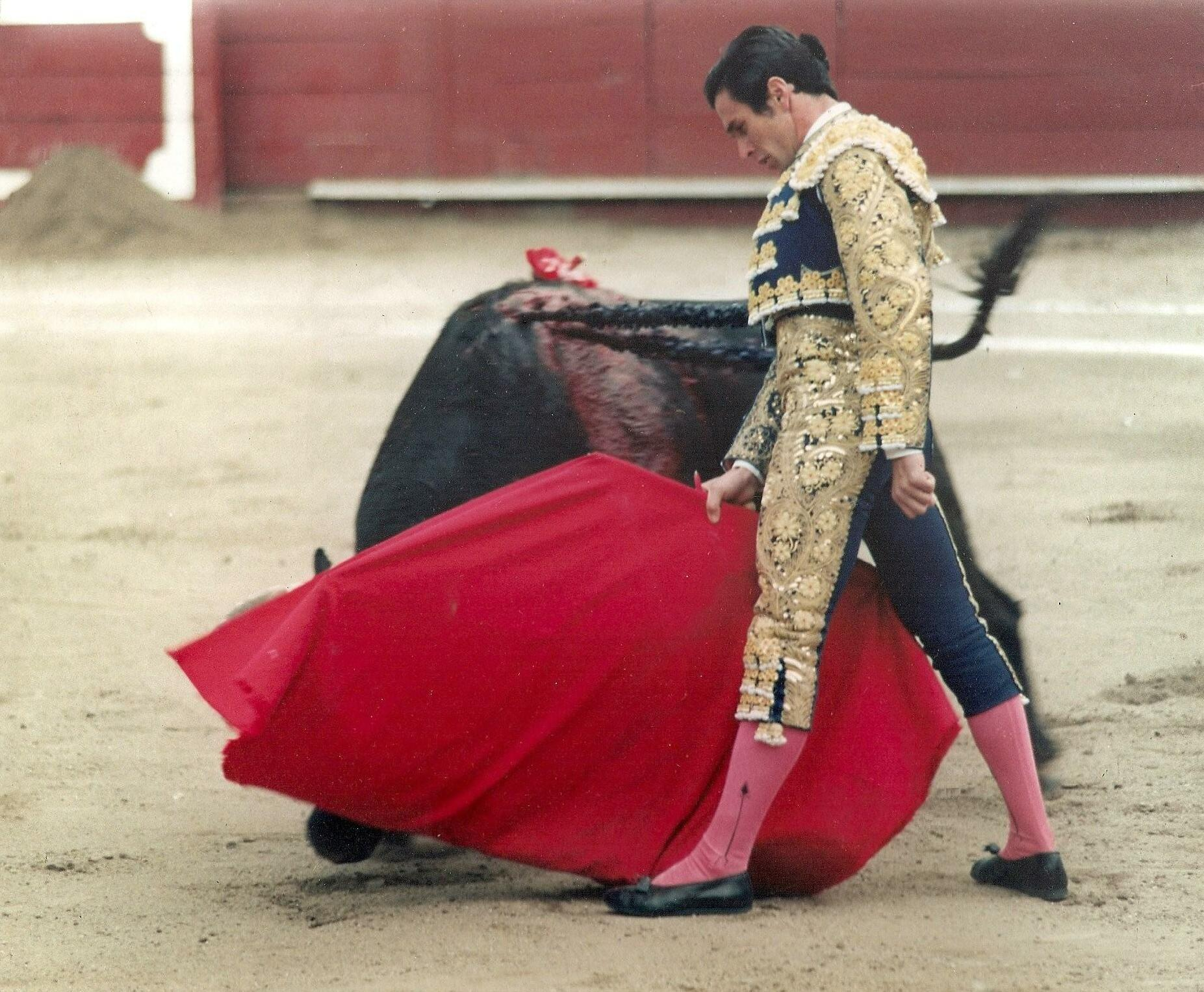
José Miguel Arroyo Delgado

José Miguel Arroyo Delgado (born May 1, 1969) is a Spanish bullfighter. He is better known in bullfighting circles as Joselito, a nickname he shares with at least two other notables: José Gomez, the Joselito bullfighter of the 1910s, and Joselito, a teen idol singer from the 1960s.

== Biography ==
Arroyo Delgado was born in Madrid. He grew up in a poor family, dreaming about fame and wealth as a bullfighter. He became a professional bullfighter in Seville at the early age of sixteen. He went on to triumph in Mexico as well as in his native country. In Mexico, he was awarded a bull's tail, the top award given to a "torero" there.

Arroyo Delgado himself admits to being one of the most battered bullfighters of his generation. In 1989 he sustained his worst injury, when he was hit by a bull and required hospitalization. In 1996 he came close to another serious injury, when he faced a bull in France: he was not fighting well that day and he was close to losing to a bull. He won the encounter, but thought seriously about retiring. Arroyo Delgado has been a controversial bullfighter in Spain: he is known for his dislike of uniforms, whether military or torero, although he does use his torero uniform. He was also both widely criticized and praised by the Spanish public for refusing to dedicate a bull to King Juan Carlos de Bourbon, dedicating it instead to his friend, "El Bote", a fellow bullfighter who had just been hospitalized after an encounter with a bull.

Arroyo Delgado is equally controversial in Spain for his religious views: although he claims to be a Catholic, he has also declared that, had he been born in another country, his God would have been either Allah or Buddha. Arroyo Delgado never prays before his fights, although this is a tradition for bullfighters in Spain, a country that has an overwhelming Catholic majority.

Arroyo Delgado is the owner of a cattle ranch. He is the adoptive son of Enrique Martin Arranz and his wife Adela. Arroyo Delgado's natural father died in 1981.
