= Javier Conde =

Spanish bullfighter

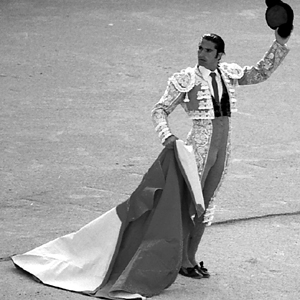
- Born: Javier Conde Becerra; February 19, 1975 (age 51); Málaga, Andalusia, Spain
- Spouse: Estrella Morente

Javier Conde Becerra (born February 19, 1975), also known as Javier Conde, is one of the most famous Spanish bullfighters to come from Málaga.

== Biography ==
The Malagueño began bullfighting on June 4, 1989, in Benalmádena. . Conde's natural style and looks, together with his polite nature, makes him popular with the press.

On December 14, 2001, he married successful flamenco singer Estrella Morente in 'Nuestra Señora de las Angustias basilica' in Granada and has 2 children.

== Filmography ==
- The Bridge of San Luis Rey (2004)..Camila's Matador
- aka Pont du roi Saint-Louis, Le (France)
- aka Puente de San Luis Rey, El (Spain)
- Hable con ella (2002) (uncredited)..Bullfighter
- aka Talk to Her (International: English title)

== Television ==
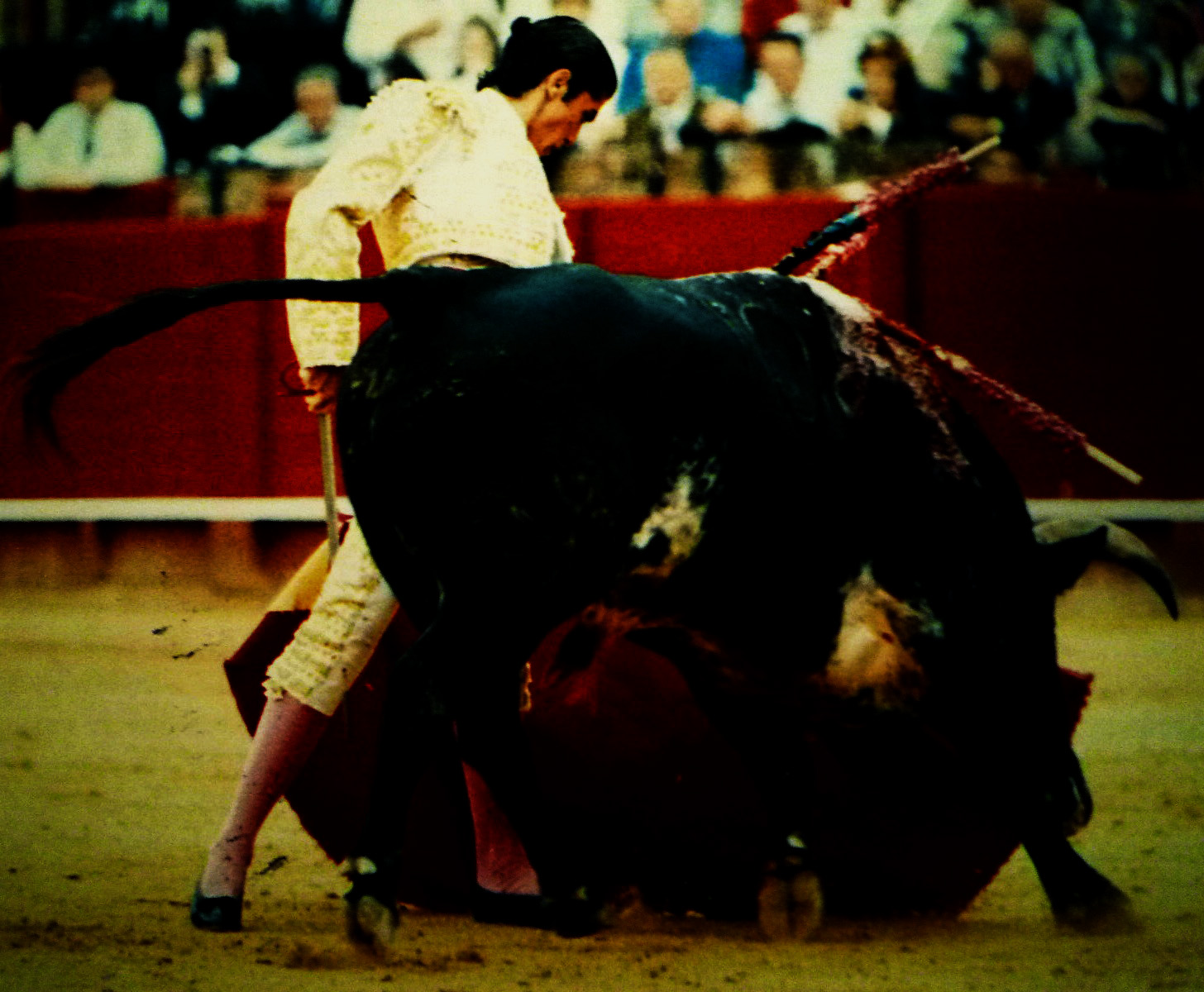
Javier Conde in Palavas in 2004

- XXI premios Goya (2007) (TV) (uncredited) As Himself - Audience Member
- "Corazón de..." .... Himself (1 episode, 2000)
- Episode dated 26 October 2000 (2000) TV Episode ...Himself
- "Qué me dices" .... Himself (3 episodes, 1996–1997)
- Episode dated 18 February 1997 (1997) TV Episode ..Himself
- Episode dated 12 November 1996 (1996) TV Episode ..Himself
- Episode dated 16 September 1996 (1996) TV Episode .Himself
- Corazón de..."
- Episode dated 3 January 2006 (2006) TV Episode ....Himself
- "Corazón, corazón"
- Episode dated 26 November 2005 (2005) TV Episode ..Himself

== See also ==
- List of bullfighters
- Bullfighting
- Torero
