= Enrique Ponce =

Spanish bullfighter

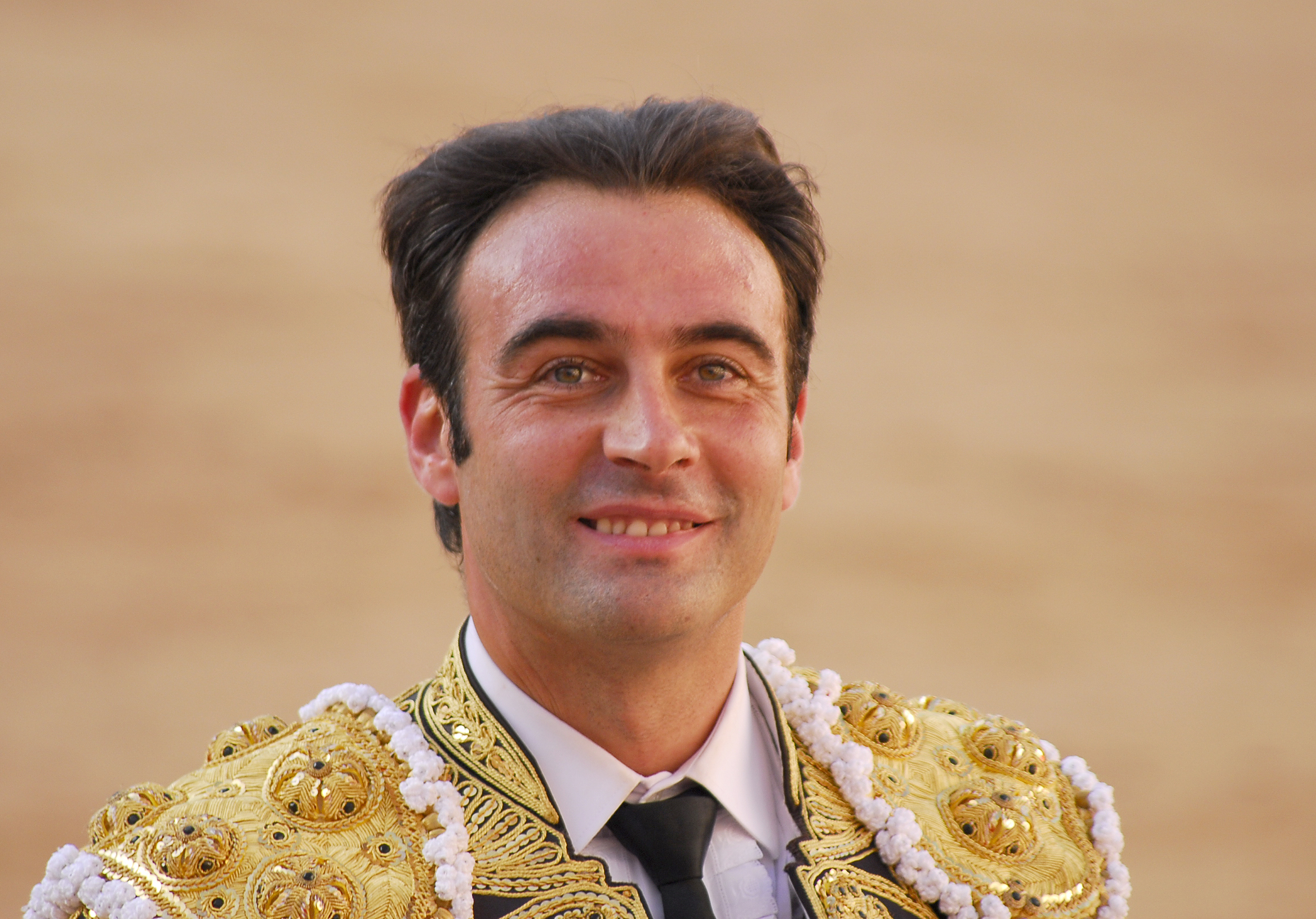
- Enrique Ponce in the Melilla Bullring, 2009
- Born: December 8, 1971 (age 54); Chiva, Valencia, Spain
- Spouse: Paloma Cuevas (1996-2020)
- Partner: Ana Soria (2020-Present)
- Website: https://www.enriqueponce.com

Alfonso Enrique Ponce Martínez (born 8 December 1971 in Chiva, Valencia, Spain), also known as Enrique Ponce, is a Spanish bullfighter.

== Biography ==
He made his first public appearance on 10 August 1986 in the Plaza De Toros in Baeza (Jaén). Some of his early debut appearances were on 9 March 1988, in Castellón with Curro Trillo and Jose Luis Torres when he was a Novillero. He began in the Escuela Taurina de Valencia, until he went into the public in 1986 in Baeza.

He performed for 10 years and over 100 corridas. Ponce is the first torero in history to fight more than 2000 corridas. He passed this mark in Ronda on 4 September 2010.

== Gorings and other injuries ==
Ponce has sustained significant injuries on several occasions. Whilst opening the Las Fallas festival in Valencia on 18 March 2014, by bullfighting a bull from the Victoriano del Río farm, he suffered a severe goring which broke his collarbone and several ribs. He was carried off the field by his assistant bullfighter Mariano de la Viña. In 2019 he was left seriously injured after being tossed in the air by a bull, leaving him with torn ligaments in his knee requiring surgery and a 10 cm core injury to his buttock. Ponce sustained further injury to his buttock in 2020 when rammed from behind by a bull at El Puerto de Santa María.

== Career information ==
- His debut without picadors in Baeza, Jaén province Spain.10 October 1986.
- His debut with picadors in Castellón de la Plana, Spain. 9 March 1988.
- Valencia, 1990 with Joselito and El Litri.

== Family and personal life ==
He got married on 25 October 1996 to Paloma Cuevas Díaz, which he describes as the biggest supporter in his life. In 2007 the couple made public they were going to have a daughter. She was born on 27 April 2008 and was named after her mother, Paloma. The couple had their second daughter on 9 January 2012, she was named Bianca.

In 2020 the couple announced they were filing for divorce, and Enrique was seen around the same time with his current partner, Ana Soria, who is 26 years younger than him.

== See also ==
- List of bullfighters
- Bullfighting
- Torero
