= Pepete (José Rodríguez Davié) =

Spanish bullfighter

José Rodríguez Davié
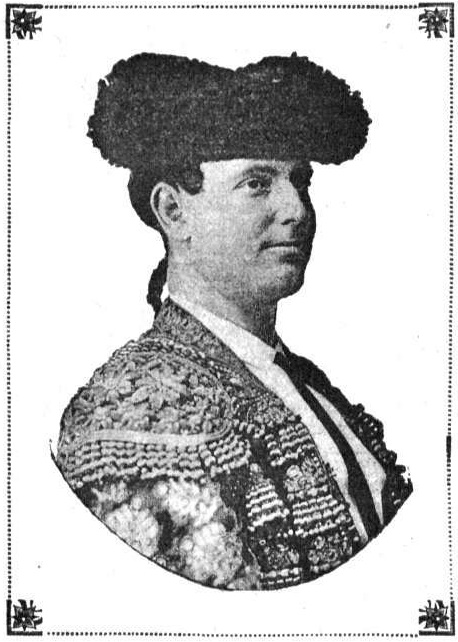

Personal information
- Nickname: Pepete
- Born: 14 May 1867; San Fernando, Cádiz, Spain
- Died: 13 September 1899 (aged 32); Fitero, Navarre
- Occupation: Bullfighter

José Rodríguez Davié (14 May 1867 – 13 September 1899), also known as Pepete, was a Spanish bullfighter.

Rodríguez Davié was born in San Fernando, Cádiz, in 1867. After traveling to South America for a period, he took the alternativa in El Puerto de Santa María in August 1891, at the hands of Luis Mazzantini. His status as a bullfighter was confirmed in Madrid shortly thereafter, under the supervision of Rafael Guerra Bejarano, with whom he traded off mano a mano in a fight with bulls from the Bañuelos ranch.

While he was seen as promising by fans early in his career, his time as a bullfighter eventually came to a tragic end. On 12 September 1899, at the Fitero bullring, the bull "Cantinero" of the Zalduendo ranch jumped the barrier behind him and severely gored his thigh. Pepete died the following day.
