= Enrique Robles =

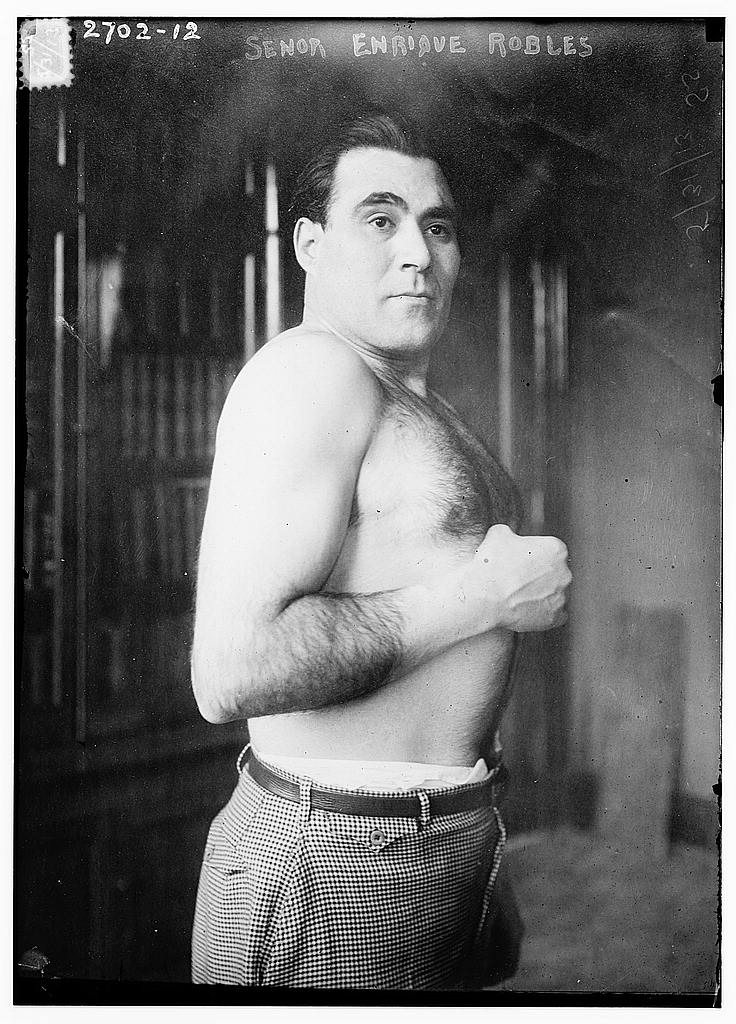
Robles in 1913

Enrique Robles of Madrid, Spain, also known as Chicorrito, was a champion torero in Mexico and in Spain. By 1927 he had killed over 1,000 bulls and had 70 scars from being gored.

== Biography ==
He toured the United States between 1902 and 1929 giving bullfights. In 1929 he had to cancel his exhibition when the police refused to let him hold a demonstration in Times Square. He may be buried in Valencia, Spain.
