= Frank Evans (bullfighter) =

British-born matador

- Frank Evans, Matador

Personal information
- Nickname(s): El Inglés (The Englishman); The bus-pass bullfighter
- Born: Francis Evans; 18 August 1942 (age 83) Salford, Lancashire, England

Sport
- Sport: Bullfighting
- Rank: Matador

Francis "Frank" Evans (born 18 August 1942) is a British-born matador, the most senior form of bullfighter, known as "El Inglés" (The Englishman.) He is reputed to be the only British bullfighter currently working professionally. He now holds Spanish citizenship.

== Early career ==
The son of a butcher, Evans had started out with ambitions to be a rugby league professional. He was first interested in bullfighting on hearing his father's stories of watching fights when going into Spain from Gibraltar during World War II. In 1963, aged 19, on his first trip abroad (to attend a wedding in Spain) he witnessed his first bullfight at the Corpus Christi festival in Granada. A subsequent reading of the autobiography of Vincent Hitchcock, the first professional British bullfighter, persuaded him that it was possible for a Briton to train as a bullfighter. In April 1964 he attended a training school in Valencia.

His first ever fight at a village festival was a disaster, with the bull running away with his cape, which had to be rescued by children. (Evans has described the event as "very Benny Hill"). His first professional fight as a novillero came in Montpellier in France in 1966, following a mix-up by the promoter, who believed he had booked another English fighter called Henry Higgins. However, by 1969, and after only three professional fights and struggling to earn a living and pay for equipment, Evans returned to Salford.

Back in Salford, he began a successful kitchen business. He was also an associate of George Best, at one point being his "unofficial manager".

== Resumption of his career ==
The death of his father in 1976 persuaded him that "life is too short" not to pursue one's dreams, and he returned to Spain. By 1979 he was fighting again professionally.

Noticing that although Evans was not highly ranked, he was drawing large crowds, the owner of the Benalmádena ring began to give Evans regular bookings. By 1991 he achieved matador status. In 2003 he was ranked number 63 in the world, out of some 10,000 bullfighters. In 2005 he announced his retirement, due to arthritis in his knee from a rugby league injury. At the time he said he would continue his business interests in property, construction and importing tobacco.

== Retirement and return ==
Subsequent to his retirement, Evans received a replacement titanium knee. On a routine health check in 2007 it was discovered that he had blocked arteries and a leaking heart valve. He underwent a quadruple heart bypass.

In 2009 he announced his return to bullfighting. His first fight was in Benalmadena, killing two bulls and receiving the ears of the bulls as an award from the judges. Evans has stated that only old age will stop him from fighting, and that he plans fights in Ecuador, Colombia and Peru, the three bullfighting countries he has yet to perform in.

== Injuries ==
Evans has been gored six times. These include a perforated buttock sustained in 1984 in Ciudad Rodrigo, and a foot-long gash sustained in a fight in Mexico.

== In the media ==
In 1988 Evans made an extended appearance on the After Dark topical discussion programme on Channel 4, alongside among others Katie Boyle and Miriam Rothschild. He was the subject of a Channel 4 documentary entitled The Buspass Bullfighter, and has written a well-received autobiography, The Last British Bullfighter. Both his retirement and return were covered extensively in the British media.

In 2009 it was reported that threats from animal rights activists had led Waterstones booksellers to abandon booksigning sessions for Evans' autobiography in Liverpool and Manchester. It was also reported that Evans had previously received death threats, and that the post office had intercepted a parcel bomb intended for him.

In 2012, Evans was featured in a book, The Bull and The Ban, giving his views on bullfighting regulations and how they could be changed to be less cruel.
