= Henry Higgins (bullfighter) =

English matador (the most senior level of bullfighter)

Henry Higgins (1944 – 1978) was an English matador, the most senior level of bullfighter, who was born in Bogotá, Colombia in 1944. He died as a result of a hang-gliding accident, while demonstrating it by jumping off a 200 ft high hill in 1978. He was educated at King Williams College in the Isle of Man.

== Career ==
His professional, or 'ring' name was "Cañadas", meaning "the canyons". He took this name to sound more Spanish, but the Spanish called him "El Inglés", "The Englishman".

He passed his "alternativa" exam in 1970, becoming a fully fledged matador. He was briefly managed by Brian Epstein. He retired in 1974.

He was an acquaintance of another bullfighter, Frank Evans, who was mistakenly booked by a bullring owner who thought he was booking Higgins. Subsequently, Evans took the fight, which started his bullfighting career.
