= Villamoronta =

Coordinates: 42°24′N 4°42′W

- municipality
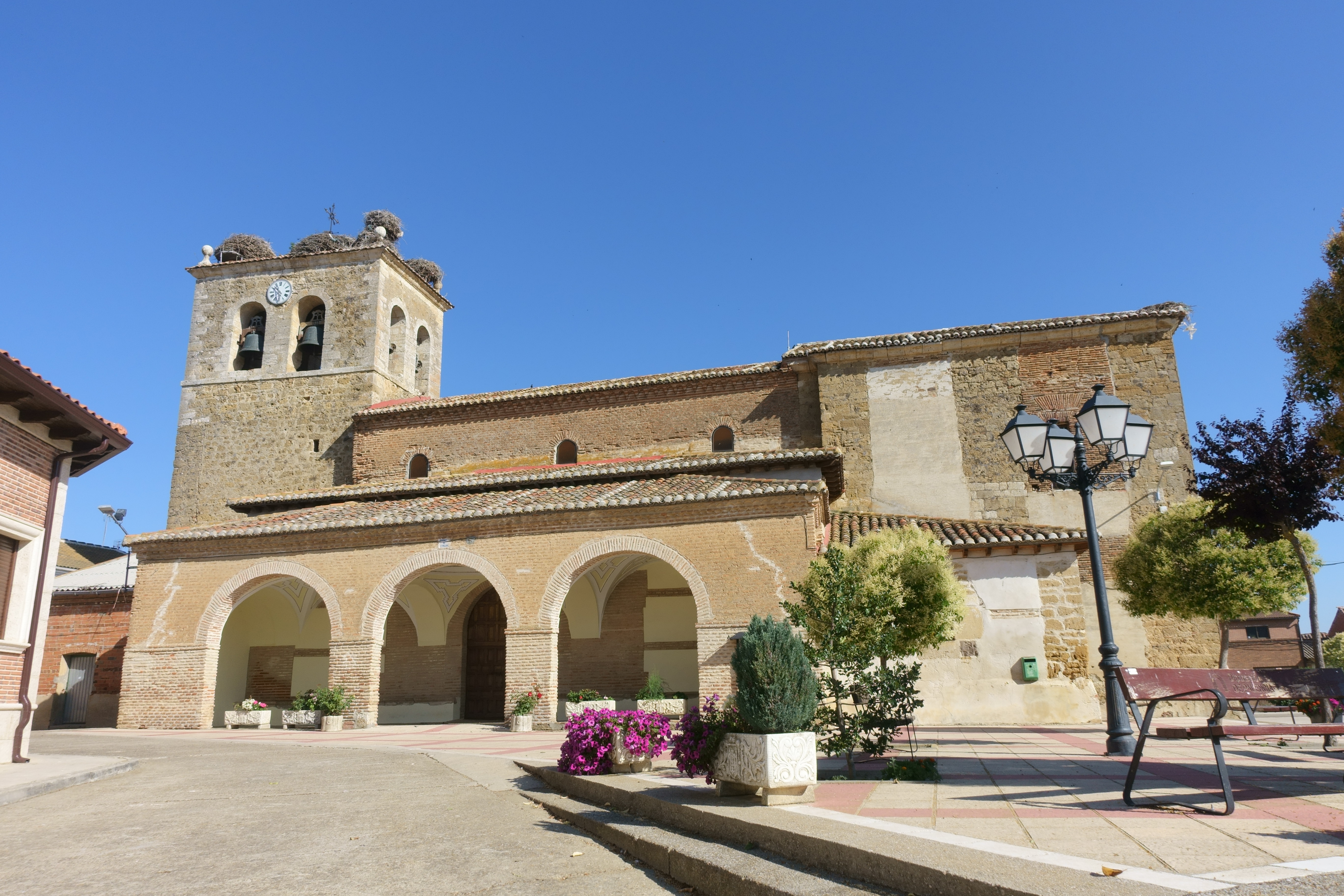

- Flag Coat of arms
- Interactive map of Villamoronta
- Country: Spain
- Autonomous community: Castile and León
- Province: Palencia
- Municipality: Villamoronta

Area
  - Total: 13 km^{2} (5.0 sq mi)

Population (2025-01-01)
  - Total: 236
  - Density: 18/km^{2} (47/sq mi)
- Time zone: UTC+1 (CET)
  - Summer (DST): UTC+2 (CEST)
- Website: Official website

Villamoronta is a municipality located in the province of Palencia, Castile and León, Spain. According to the 2014 census (INE), the municipality has a population of 235 inhabitants.
