= Rafael Guerra Bejarano =

Spanish bullfighter (1862–1941)

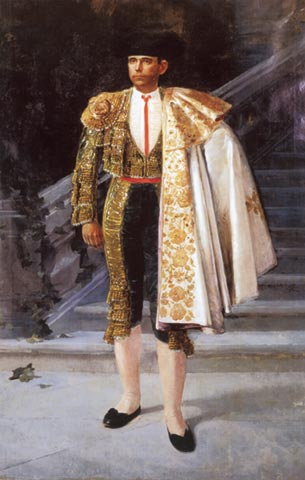
El Guerra by Julio Romero de Torres

Rafael Guerra Bejarano (Professionally known as Guerrita, a diminutive nickname of his surname) (January 1862 – 6 February 1941) was born in Cordoba. He was a professional Spanish bullfighter who achieved fame during the 1890s. His uncle, José "Pepete" Damaso Rodriguez Rodriguez, also a professional bullfighter, was killed in Madrid by a bull called Jocinero, on March 6, 1862. In 1878 he started a long apprenticeship as banderillero (banderilla-man) and second swordsman. He became a full bullfighter on September 29, 1887, in Madrid. His sponsor (apoderado) was the bullfighter "Lagartijo" Rafael Molina). On that occasion "Guerrita" said "I trust rather the benevolence of the public than my own merits and will try to fulfil my task by doing my best".

A Spanish hand fan commemorating the 1887 event—Rafael Guerra's "alternativa"—survives in the collection of the Staten Island Historical Society at Historic Richmond Town in New York. It features a depiction of "Guerrita" receiving the sword of "Lagartijo". This ceremony marked the elevation of Rafael Guerra Bejarano from an apprentice to a professional matador.

He is also known for having killed nine bulls in three separate cities on the same day. On May 19, 1895, at six o'clock in the morning, he got dressed (he wore a gold and green costume that he would not take off until nightfall) to kill three of Saltillo's bulls at 7 a.m. in San Fernando. Guerrita then proceeded to nearby Jerez de la Frontera and killed three bulls of the Cámara livestock at 10:30 a.m. At 5:30 p.m., on that same killed three more bulls in Seville from the Murube livestock.

From 1890 to 1899, the Cordovan bullfighter was thought to be on top of his profession, sharing top billing with Lagartijo and Frascuelo. However, he surprisingly announced his retirement on October 15, 1899, in Zaragoza: "I quit bullfighting, but not of my own accord, I'm jinxed.". During his career, Guerrita took part in 891 bullfights, killed 2547 bulls and never had the three warnings, a 15-minute limit in which the matador must kill the bull.

== Quotes about him ==
(TEN MASTERS by Bernardo V. Carande, Los Toros by Ed. Indice, page 117)
