= Pepete (José Dámaso Rodríguez y Rodríguez) =

Spanish bullfighter

José Dámaso Rodríguez y Rodríguez
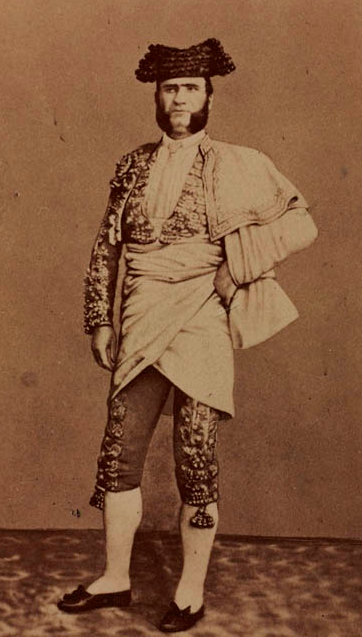

Personal information
- Nickname: Pepete
- Nationality: Spanish
- Born: 11 December 1824; Córdoba, Spain
- Died: 20 April 1862 (aged 37); Madrid, Spain
- Occupation: Matador

José Dámaso Rodríguez y Rodríguez (11 December 1824 – 20 April 1862), known as Pepete, was a Spanish bullfighter in the mid-19th century. He was the first notable matador known by this nickname.

== Biography ==
José Dámaso Rodríguez y Rodríguez was born in 1824 in the La Merced neighborhood of Córdoba, Spain. He joined the family business, the livestock trade, and was married very young to Rafaela Bejarano, who came from a family of bullfighters.

He began bullfighting under the nickname Pepete, starting in the cuadrillas of Antonio Luque Camará and José Redondo "El Chiclanero". He took the alternativa on 12 August 1850 in Seville, although some historians disagree as to the exact date and location of his alternativa. Two years later, on 4 July 1852, he debuted in Madrid, but it would be another year until he had his confirmación, or confirmation of his status, at the hands of Cayetano Sanz on 27 June 1853.

Pepete was considered a valiant bullfighter who thrilled the public, as passionate about the bullring as he was about money. It is said that on one occasion, having sustained a chest injury from getting very close to the bull, he later showed his lesions to his friends and said: "... I cure this kind of thing myself with this meicina" — the gold coin he received as his pay. In the 1850s, he toured the most important bullrings across Spain, receiving both fans' recognition and multiple injuries.

On 20 April 1862, in a bullfighting ring in Madrid, the second bull of the afternoon, a Miura bull named Jocinero, knocked over the picador during the suerte de varas, prompting Pepete to jump in to lift him from his horse. However, the bull struck Pepete in the heart. The matador calmly got up and walked toward the edge of the ring, where he fell dead.
