= César Rincón =

Colombian matador (born 1965)

Julio César Rincón Ramírez (born 5 September 1965 in Bogotá) is a Colombian matador.

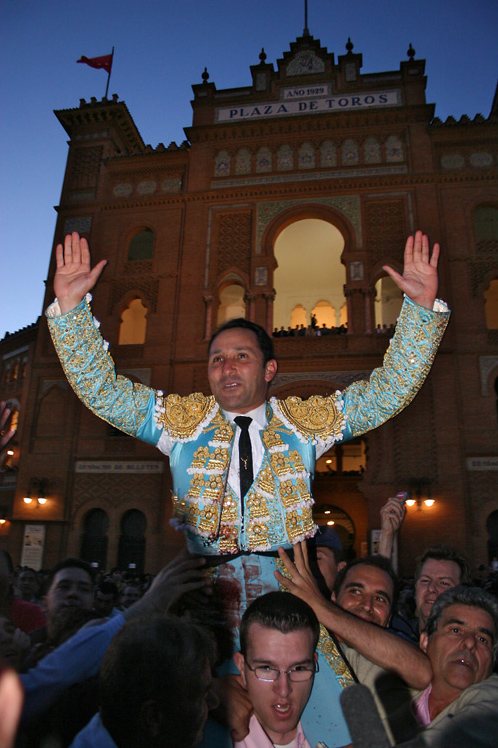
César Rincón in 2005
