= Ernesto Pastor =

Puerto Rican bullfighter (1892–1921)

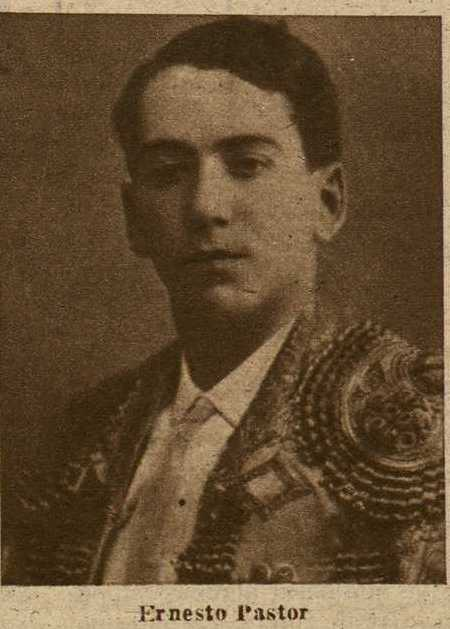
- Born: Ernesto Pastor Lavergne; April 4, 1892; Ponce, Captaincy General of Puerto Rico, Spanish Empire
- Died: June 11, 1921 (aged 29); Madrid, Spain
- Occupation: Torero
- Known for: First Puerto Rican bullfighter
- Children: María Blanca Estela Pastor Lavergne
- Parent(s): Jaime Pastor y Bauzá, Julieta Lavergne y Salazar

Ernesto Pastor Lavergne (April 4, 1892 - June 11, 1921) was the first of only two Puerto Rican-born bullfighters to gain international fame, the other being Juan Ramón Fernández.

== Early life and career ==
Some date Pastor's birth year as 1900, but it is generally accepted that he was born in 1892. He was born in Ponce, Puerto Rico to a Mexican father and French mother. Pastor was considered by his contemporary colleagues to be talented both with the sword and the cape.

=== International success ===
On January 15, 1911, he made his public debut, at a plaza in Guadalajara, Mexico. There, he would be revered as one of the best of his era. Pastor relocated to Spain in 1916, fighting for the first time there on May 16, 1916, in Barcelona. In Spain, he was mentored by José Gómez Ortega. In 1918, Pastor engaged in 38 bullfighting spectacles, and in 1919, he debuted in Madrid.

== Death ==
It was in Madrid on June 11, 1921, that Pastor met with death. On June 11, 1921, during a bullfighting event, his leg was gored by a bull. Bleeding profusely, he managed to ask who turned off the lights? before dying. The hemorrhage in his leg had caused him to go blind before dying.

== See also ==
- Conchita Cintrón
- List of Puerto Ricans
- List of Mexicans
