= List of number-one singles of 1995 (Canada) =

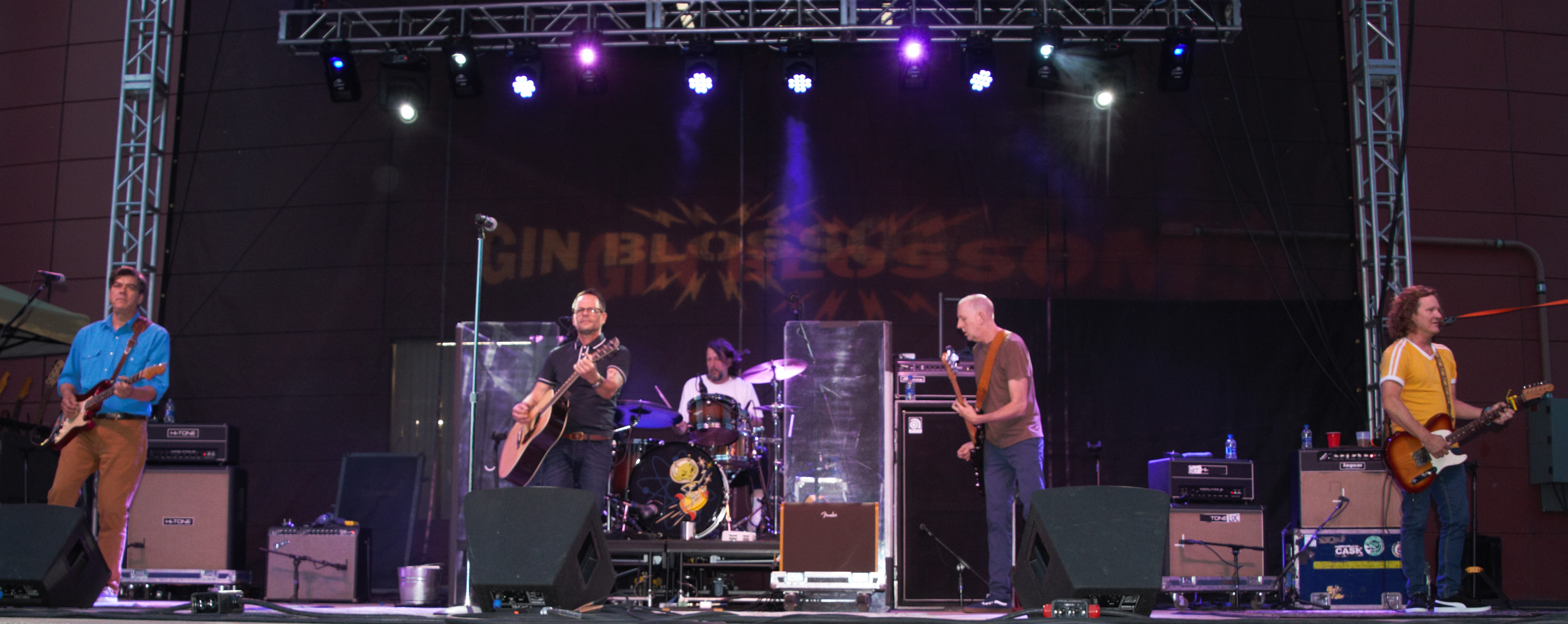
American rock band Gin Blossoms spent the most weeks at number one in 1995 with "Til I Hear It from You", which stayed at the top for six weeks.

RPM was a Canadian magazine that published the best-performing singles of Canada from 1964 to 2000. Eighteen songs reached number one in 1995. Bon Jovi had the first number-one hit of the year with "Always", and Alanis Morissette finished the year at number one with "Hand in My Pocket". Eight musical artists topped the RPM Singles Chart for the first time this year: Jann Arden, R.E.M., Dionne Farris, the Rembrandts, Hootie & the Blowfish, Gin Blossoms, Take That, and Alanis Morissette. No musical act topped the chart with more than one single in 1995.

Gin Blossoms spent the most weeks at number one, six, with "Til I Hear It from You". However, it was the Rembrandts' song "I'll Be There for You"—best known as the opening theme for the American sitcom Friends—that topped the RPM year-chart for 1995; it spent five weeks at the number-one position in July and August. In September, Tom Cochrane accomplished a rare feat by debuting at number one with "I Wish You Well", an event that had only been seen once before, in 1985 with Band Aid's "Do They Know It's Christmas?" (this does not include the magazine's number-one single from its debut issue).

Jann Arden, Bryan Adams, Tom Cochrane, and Alanis Morissette were the four Canadians who topped their native country's chart in 1995. Adams peaked at number one for five weeks with "Have You Ever Really Loved a Woman?", and Elton John picked up his 18th Canadian chart-topper with "Believe", which had a four-week stint at the summit. Morissette's "Hand in My Pocket" also stayed at number one for four weeks, and Arden—along with Boyz II Men, Sheryl Crow, and Hootie & the Blowfish—topped the chart for three weeks.

Key
† Indicates best-performing single of 1995

== Chart history ==
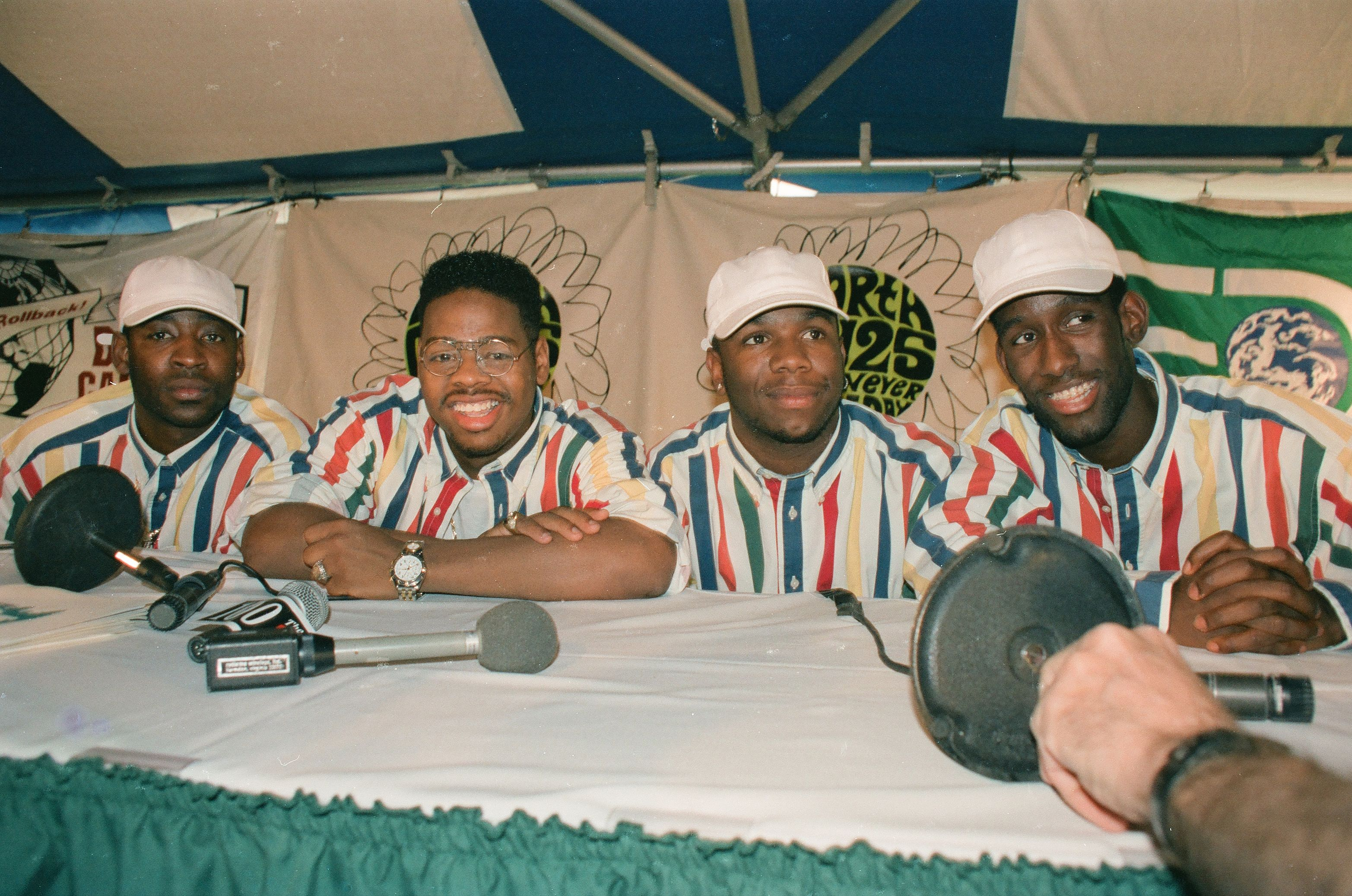
Boyz II Men spent three weeks at number one in January with "On Bended Knee", becoming the group's second Canadian number-one hit.

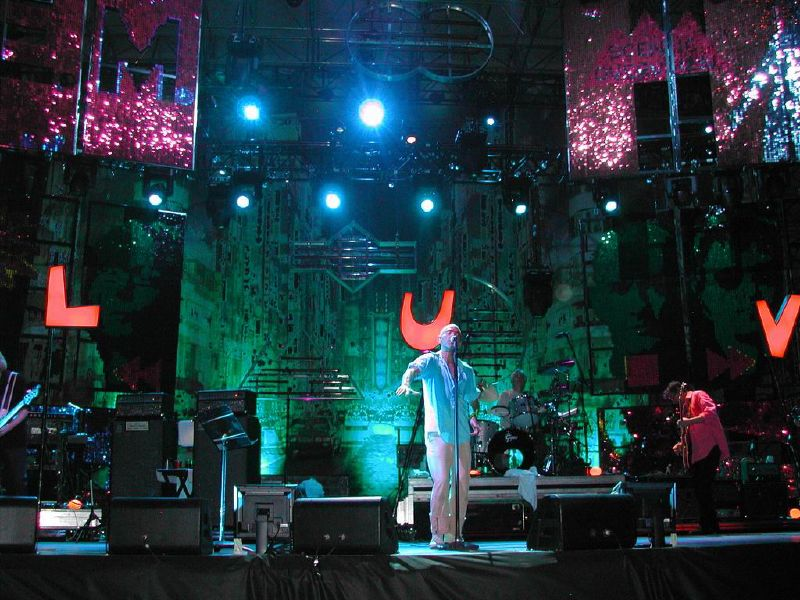
"Bang and Blame" gave R.E.M. their first and only number-one single in Canada.

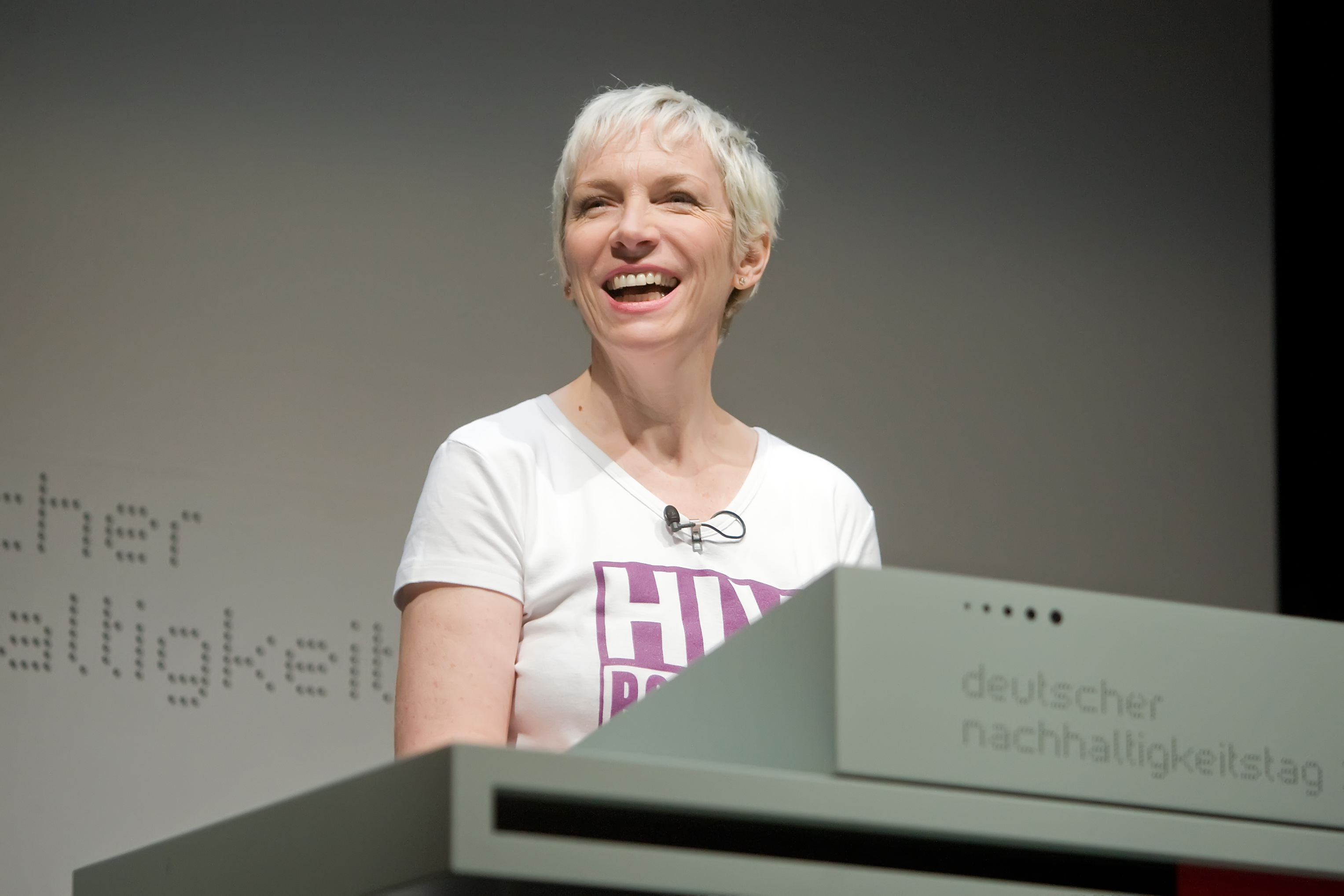
Annie Lennox's cover of "No More 'I Love You's" spent two issues at number one in May.

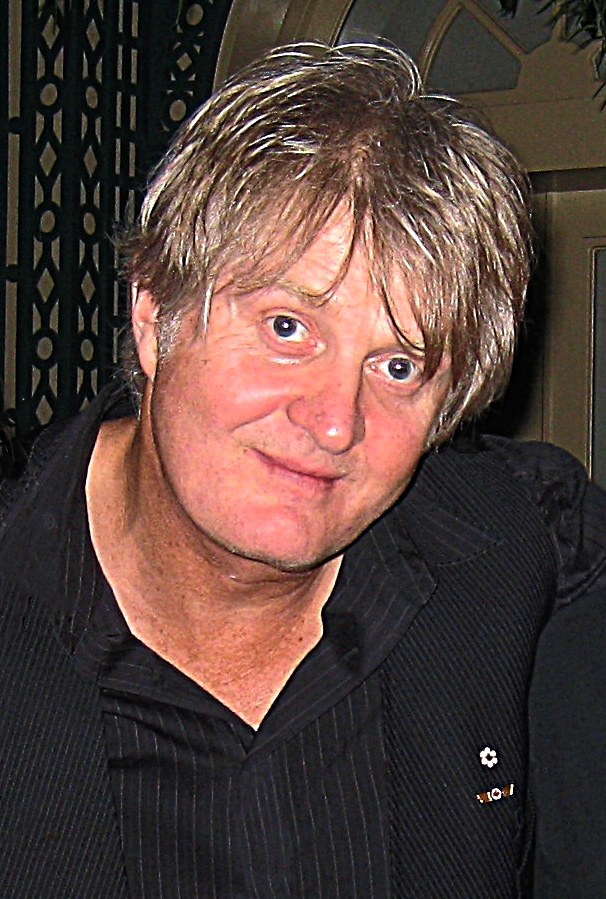
Tom Cochrane became only the second musical act to debut at number one on RPM, doing so with "I Wish You Well".

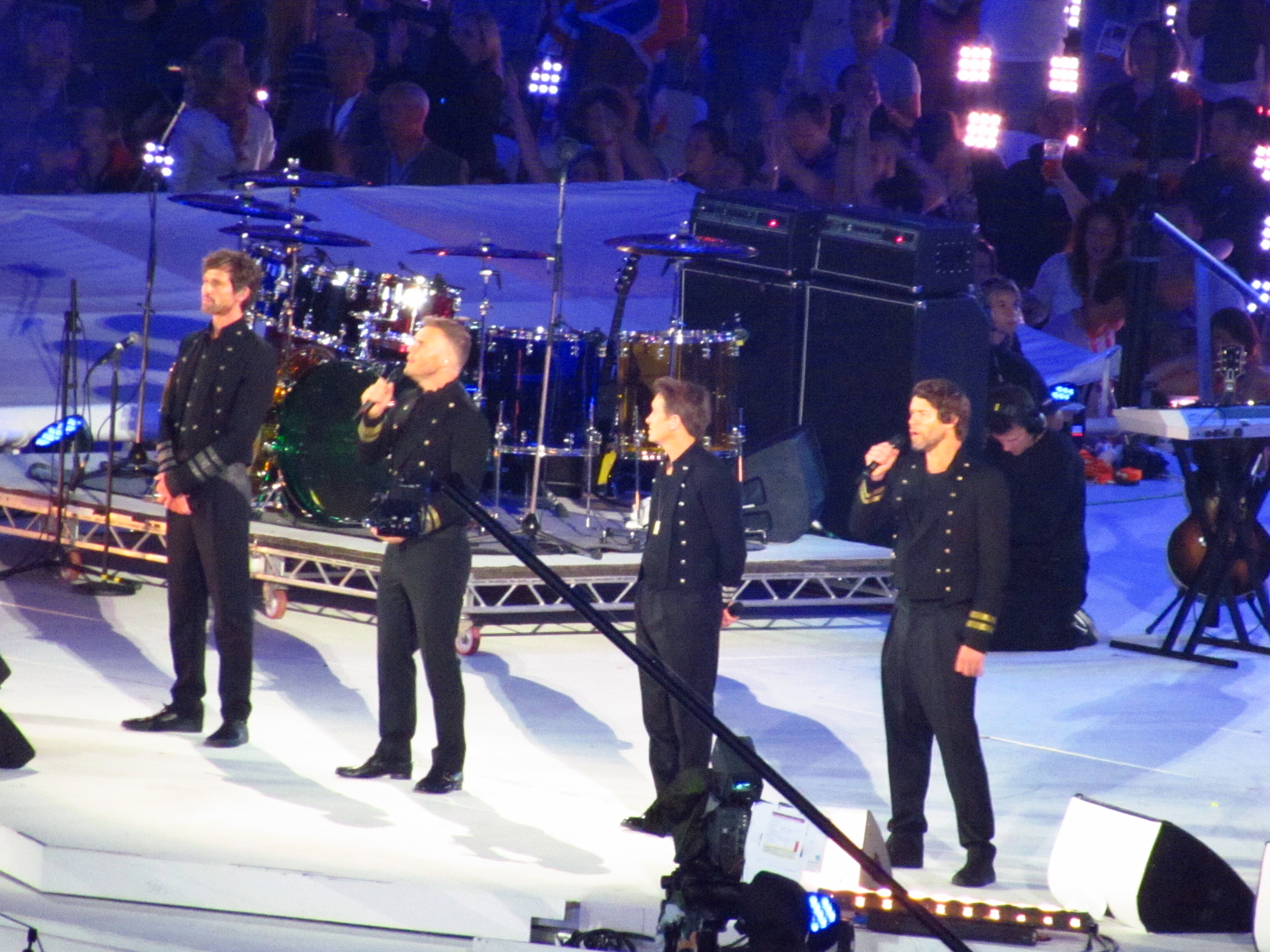
English pop group Take That had a two-week stay at number one with "Back for Good" in November.

Issue date	Song	Artist	Reference
2 January (Note: Due to a two-week break in publication over the 1994/1995 Christmas/New Year period, the week of 2 January is inferred.)	"Always"	Bon Jovi	
9 January	"On Bended Knee"	Boyz II Men	
16 January	"On Bended Knee"	Boyz II Men	
23 January	"On Bended Knee"	Boyz II Men	
30 January	"Insensitive"	Jann Arden	
6 February	"Insensitive"	Jann Arden	
13 February	"Insensitive"	Jann Arden	
20 February	"Bang and Blame"	R.E.M.	
27 February	"Bang and Blame"	R.E.M.	
6 March	"Take a Bow"	Madonna	
13 March	"Take a Bow"	Madonna	
20 March	"Strong Enough"	Sheryl Crow	
27 March	"Strong Enough"	Sheryl Crow	
3 April	"Strong Enough"	Sheryl Crow	
10 April	"I Know"	Dionne Farris	
17 April	"Believe"	Elton John	
24 April	"Believe"	Elton John	
1 May	"Believe"	Elton John	
8 May	"Believe"	Elton John	
15 May	"No More 'I Love You's"	Annie Lennox	
22 May	"No More 'I Love You's"	Annie Lennox	
29 May	"Have You Ever Really Loved a Woman?"	Bryan Adams	
5 June	"Have You Ever Really Loved a Woman?"	Bryan Adams	
12 June	"Have You Ever Really Loved a Woman?"	Bryan Adams	
19 June	"Have You Ever Really Loved a Woman?"	Bryan Adams	
26 June	"Have You Ever Really Loved a Woman?"	Bryan Adams	
3 July	"Leave Virginia Alone"	Rod Stewart	
10 July	"Leave Virginia Alone"	Rod Stewart	
17 July	"I'll Be There for You"†	The Rembrandts	
24 July	"I'll Be There for You"†	The Rembrandts	
31 July	"I'll Be There for You"†	The Rembrandts	
7 August	"I'll Be There for You"†	The Rembrandts	
14 August	"I'll Be There for You"†	The Rembrandts	
21 August	"Only Wanna Be with You"	Hootie & the Blowfish	
28 August	"Only Wanna Be with You"	Hootie & the Blowfish	
4 September	"I Wish You Well"	Tom Cochrane	
11 September	"I Wish You Well"	Tom Cochrane	
18 September	"Only Wanna Be with You"	Hootie & the Blowfish	
25 September	"Til I Hear It from You"	Gin Blossoms	
2 October	"Til I Hear It from You"	Gin Blossoms	
9 October	"Til I Hear It from You"	Gin Blossoms	
16 October	"Til I Hear It from You"	Gin Blossoms	
23 October	"Til I Hear It from You"	Gin Blossoms	
30 October	"Til I Hear It from You"	Gin Blossoms	
6 November	"Back for Good"	Take That	
13 November	"Back for Good"	Take That	
20 November	"Fantasy"	Mariah Carey	
27 November	"Fantasy"	Mariah Carey	
4 December	"Hand in My Pocket"	Alanis Morissette	
11 December	"Hand in My Pocket"	Alanis Morissette	
18 December	"Hand in My Pocket"	Alanis Morissette	
25 December (Note: Due to a two-week break in publication over the 1995/1996 Christmas/New Year period, the week of 25 December is inferred.)	"Hand in My Pocket"	Alanis Morissette	

== See also ==
- 1995 in music
- List of number-one albums of 1995 (Canada)
- List of RPM number-one adult contemporary singles of 1995
- List of RPM number-one alternative rock singles of 1995
- List of RPM number-one country singles of 1995
- List of RPM number-one dance singles of 1995
- List of Billboard Hot 100 number-one singles of 1995
- List of Cash Box Top 100 number-one singles of 1995
