= Greatest Hits (The Rembrandts album) =

Greatest hits album by The Rembrandts
- Released: 2006
- Recorded: 1980–2001
- Genre: Pop rock, soft rock, alternative rock, power pop, folk rock, baroque pop, jangle pop
- Label: Rhino

The Rembrandts chronology
Choice Picks (2005)	Greatest Hits (2006)

Greatest Hits is a compilation album by the American pop rock duo The Rembrandts. Unlike their previous compilation album, Choice Picks, all of the songs are in their original forms and are not re-recorded.

The first two songs were made by Great Buildings, a band in which Danny Wilde and Phil Solem had been together before they created The Rembrandts.

== Track listing ==
1. "Hold on to Something" - Great Buildings
2. "Maybe It's You" - Great Buildings
3. "Just the Way It Is, Baby"
4. "Someone"
5. "Save Me"
6. "New King"
7. "If Not for Misery"
8. "Follow You Down"
9. "Johnny, Have You Seen Her?"
10. "Rolling Down the Hill"
11. "I'll Be There for You"
12. "Don't Hide Your Love"
13. "April 29"
14. "End of the Beginning"
15. "This House Is Not a Home"
16. "Shakespeare's Tragedy"
17. "Long Walk Back"
18. "Summertime"
19. "Too Late"
20. "Lost Together"
