= List of RPM number-one adult contemporary singles of 1995 =

RPM was a Canadian music industry magazine that published the best-performing singles charts in Canada from 1964 to 2000. In 1995, RPM published a chart for top-performing singles played in adult contemporary radio stations in Canada. The chart, entitled Adult Contemporary Tracks, undergone numerous name changes throughout its existence, becoming Adult Contemporary in August 1984. In April 1992, it became Adult Contemporary Tracks, reflecting its increased inclusion of radio-only singles, and the chart maintained that naming until the magazine ceased publication in November 2000. In 1995, twenty-three individual songs topped the chart, which contained 60 positions and is compiled based on a song's cumulative adult contemporary radio airplay points.

RPM's first number-one adult contemporary track for 1995 was "The Sweetest Days" by Vanessa Williams, continuing from the 1994 charts. It would then be replaced on the top of the chart by "So Blind" by Canadian artist Alan Frew, then by "Take a Bow" by Madonna, which topped the chart for four non-consecutive weeks, broken by "Sukiyaki" by 4 P.M. and "You Gotta Be" by Des'ree. The best-performing single of the year was "Have You Every Really Loved a Woman" by Bryan Adams, recorded for the soundtrack of the 1994 film Don Juan DeMarco and topped the chart for six consecutive weeks from the final week of May to the first week of July. The final number-one of the year was "Exhale (Shoop Shoop)" by Whitney Houston, which topped the chart from late November of 1995 until January of 1996.

Key
† Indicates best-performing adult contemporary single of 1995

== Chart history ==
Chart history
Issue date	Title	Artist(s)	Ref.
January 2 (Note: Due to a two-week break in publication for the 1994/1995 Christmas and New Year period, the weeks of January 2, 9 and 16 are inferred.)	"The Sweetest Days"	Vanessa Williams	
January 9	"The Sweetest Days"	Vanessa Williams	
January 16	"The Sweetest Days"	Vanessa Williams	
January 23	"The Sweetest Days"	Vanessa Williams	
January 30	"So Blind"	Alan Frew	
February 6	"Take a Bow"	Madonna	
February 13	"Take a Bow"	Madonna	
February 20	"Sukiyaki"	4 P.M.	
February 27	"You Gotta Be"	Des'ree	
March 6	"Take a Bow"	Madonna	
March 13	"Take a Bow"	Madonna	
March 20	"O Siem"	Susan Aglukark	
March 27	"O Siem"	Susan Aglukark	
April 3	"Believe"	Elton John	
April 10	"Believe"	Elton John	
April 17	"Believe"	Elton John	
April 24	"Believe"	Elton John	
May 1	"Believe"	Elton John	
May 8	"Believe"	Elton John	
May 15	"No More "I Love You's""	Annie Lennox	
May 22	"No More "I Love You's""	Annie Lennox	
May 29	"Have You Ever Really Loved a Woman?"	Bryan Adams	
June 5	"Have You Ever Really Loved a Woman?"	Bryan Adams	
June 12	"Have You Ever Really Loved a Woman?"	Bryan Adams	
June 19	"Have You Ever Really Loved a Woman?"	Bryan Adams	
June 26	"Have You Ever Really Loved a Woman?"	Bryan Adams	
July 3	"Have You Ever Really Loved a Woman?"	Bryan Adams	
July 10	"Leave Virginia Alone"	Rod Stewart	
July 17	"Leave Virginia Alone"	Rod Stewart	
July 24	"Leave Virginia Alone"	Rod Stewart	
July 31	"I'll Be There for You"	The Rembrandts	
August 7	"I'll Be There for You"	The Rembrandts	
August 14	"I Can Love You Like That"	All-4-One	
August 21	"Colors of the Wind"	Vanessa Williams	
August 28	"Unloved"	Jann Arden and Jackson Browne	
September 4	"Made in England"	Elton John	
September 11	"Big Sky"	Hemingway Corner	
September 18	"Only Wanna Be with You"	Hootie & the Blowfish	
September 25	"Walk in the Sun"	Bruce Hornsby	
October 2	"I Could Fall in Love"	Selena	
October 9	"Back for Good"	Take That	
October 16	"Can I Touch You...There?"	Michael Bolton	
October 23	"Can I Touch You...There?"	Michael Bolton	
October 30	"I Could Fall in Love"	Selena	
November 6	"I Could Fall in Love"	Selena	
November 13	"Runaway"	Janet Jackson	
November 20	"Exhale (Shoop Shoop)"	Whitney Houston	
November 27	"Exhale (Shoop Shoop)"	Whitney Houston	
December 4	"Exhale (Shoop Shoop)"	Whitney Houston	
December 11	"Exhale (Shoop Shoop)"	Whitney Houston	
December 18	"Exhale (Shoop Shoop)"	Whitney Houston	
December 25 (Note: Due to a two-week break in publication for the 1995/1996 Christmas and New Year period, the week of December 25 is inferred.)	"Exhale (Shoop Shoop)"	Whitney Houston	
