= Choice Picks =

Compilation album by The Rembrandts
- Released: 2005
- Recorded: Pueblo Sound
- Genre: Pop rock, alternative rock, soft rock, folk rock, jangle pop, power pop, baroque pop
- Label: Fuel 2000
- Producer: The Rembrandts

The Rembrandts chronology
Lost Together (2001)	Choice Picks (2005)	Greatest Hits (2006)

Choice Picks is a compilation album by the American pop rock duo The Rembrandts. The album contains re-recorded versions of the group's biggest hits, as well as other favorite songs from the group.

There are two versions of Choice Picks, one released through Awarestore.com which includes the new track "Chasin' Down a Rainbow". The other version was released on the Fuel 2000 label on November 15, 2005, with the new track "Don't Give Me Up".

== Track listing ==
1. "Just the Way It Is, Baby"
2. "Someone"
3. "Show Me Your Love"
4. "Burning Timber"
5. "Johnny Have You Seen Her?"
6. "Maybe Tomorrow"
7. "Chase the Clouds Away"
8. "Rollin' Down the Hill"
9. "I'll Be There for You"
10. "Don't Hide Your Love"
11. "Drowning in Your Tears"
12. "This House Is Not a Home"
13. "Lost Together"
14. "Don't Give Me Up"
