= Danny Wilde =

Danny Wilde may refer to:

- Danny Wilde (musician) (born 1956), member of the band The Rembrandts
- Danny Wilde, fictional character played by Tony Curtis in 1970s TV show The Persuaders!
