= Lost Together =

Lost Together may refer to:

- Lost Together (Blue Rodeo album), 1992, or the title song
- Lost Together (The Rembrandts album), 2001, or the title song
- Lost Forever // Lost Together, 2014 album by Architects
