= L.P. (The Rembrandts album) =

Studio album by The Rembrandts
- Released: May 23, 1995
- Studios: Rumbo Studios, Canoga Park, & A&M Studios, Hollywood & Master Control, Burbank, Funkytown, Minneapolis
- Genres: Pop rock; power pop; soft rock; alternative rock
- Length: 62:15
- Labels: East West, Atlantic
- Producers: Don Smith, Phil Solem, Danny Wilde

The Rembrandts chronology
Untitled (1992)	L.P. (1995)	Spin This (1998)

Singles from L.P.
- 1. "Comin' Home (USA Only)" Released: 1995; 2. "Don't Hide Your Love (Europe only)" Released: 1995; 3. "This House Is Not a Home/I'll Be There for You" Released: 1995; 4. "Drowning in Your Tears (USA only)" Released: 1996

Professional ratings
Review scores
Source	Rating
Allmusic	3/5 stars

L.P. (also titled The Rembrandts: L.P.) is the third album by the American pop rock duo The Rembrandts. It was released on East West Records on May 23, 1995. It is the duo's highest-charting album to date, reaching No. 23 on the Billboard 200 album chart in August 1995, and has been certified platinum. The fifteenth track (which was a "hidden track" on the original album release) is "I'll Be There for You", which was used as the theme song for the sitcom Friends.

== Track listing ==
All tracks are written by Phil Solem and Danny Wilde except where noted.

No.	Title	Writer(s)	Length
1.	"End of the Beginning"	Solem, Wilde, Pat Mastelotto	4:27
2.	"Easy to Forget"		4:25
3.	"My Own Way"		4:07
4.	"Don't Hide Your Love"		4:20
5.	"Drowning in Your Tears"	Solem, Wilde, Mastelotto	4:33
6.	"This House Is Not a Home"		3:19
7.	"April 29"		4:35
8.	"Lovin' Me Insane"		4:01
9.	"There Goes Lucy"	Solem, Wilde, Joe Laswell	3:36
10.	"As Long as I Am Breathing"		4:37
11.	"Call Me"	Solem, Wilde, Scott Miller	4:02
12.	"Comin' Home"		4:07
13.	"What Will It Take"		4:43
14.	"The Other Side of Night"		3:58
15.	"I'll Be There for You" (Theme from Friends)	David Crane, Marta Kauffman, Michael Skloff, Allee Willis, Solem, Wilde	3:09

== Personnel ==
The Rembrandts are

- Phil Sölem – vocals, guitar, production
- Danny Wilde – vocals, bass, guitar, production

Additional musicians

- Pat Mastelotto – drums
- Michael Ramos – Hammond organ, piano and synthesizer
- Jon Niefeld – drums (tracks 3, 4, 6, 8, 10, 11)
- Benmont Tench – Hammond organ (track 12)
- Billy Payne – Hammond organ (track 2)
- Phil Jones – percussion
- Geri Sutyak – cello (track 1)
- John Pierce – bass (tracks 1, 2, 5, 9, 12 to 14)
- John Strawberry Fields – farfisa organ (track 6), Wurlitzer piano (track 4)
- Michael Skfoff – Hammond B3 (track 15)

Production

- Don Smith – production, recording
- John Fields - recording
- Greg Goldman – recording
- Gavin MacKillop – production, recording, mixing
- Jeff Robinson – assistant
- Stephen Marcussen – mastering

== Charts ==
=== Weekly charts ===
Chart (1995)	Peak position
Australian Albums (ARIA)	133
Canada Top Albums/CDs (RPM)	8
New Zealand Albums (RMNZ)	25
Scottish Albums (Official Charts)	21
UK Albums (Official Charts)	14
US Billboard 200	23

=== Year-end charts ===
Chart (1995)	Position
Canada Top Albums/CDs (RPM)	48
US Billboard 200	114
