= The Rembrandts (album) =

Studio album by the Rembrandts
- Released: September 4, 1990
- Recorded: 1989−1990
- Genres: Pop rock; jangle pop
- Length: 43:51
- Label: Atco
- Producer: The Rembrandts

The Rembrandts chronology
The Rembrandts (1990)	Untitled (1992)

Singles from The Rembrandts
- 1. "Just the Way It Is, Baby" Released: 1990; 2. "Someone" Released: 1991; 3. "Burning Timber" Released: 1991; 4. "Save Me" Released: 1991

Professional ratings
Review scores
Source	Rating
AllMusic	4.5/5 stars

The Rembrandts is the first album by the American pop rock duo the Rembrandts, released on September 4, 1990, by Atco Records.

== Track listing ==
All music is composed by the Rembrandts, except where noted.

No.	Title	Writer(s)	Length
1.	"Just the Way It Is, Baby"	The Rembrandts	4:06
2.	"Save Me"	The Rembrandts	4:43
3.	"Someone"	The Rembrandts	3:49
4.	"Show Me Your Love"	The Rembrandts	3:10
5.	"New King"	The Rembrandts	2:42
6.	"Every Secret Thing"	The Rembrandts, Pat Mastelotto	3:50
7.	"If Not for Misery"	The Rembrandts	3:23
8.	"Moonlight on Mt. Hood"	The Rembrandts	0:25
9.	"Goodnight"	The Rembrandts	1:28
10.	"Burning Timber"	The Rembrandts, Mastelotto	3:32
11.	"Confidential Information"	The Rembrandts	3:11
12.	"Everyday People"	The Rembrandts	5:04
13.	"Follow You Down"	The Rembrandts	4:04
Total length:			43:51

== Personnel ==
=== The Rembrandts ===
- Phil Solem – vocals, electric and acoustic guitars, keyboards
- Danny Wilde – vocals, acoustic guitars, bass guitar, keyboards, percussion

=== Additional personnel ===
- David Zeman – Hammond organ, Wurlitzer electric piano, accordion
- Pat Mastelotto – drums, percussion

=== Production ===
- Produced, recorded and mixed by the Rembrandts
- Recorded and mixed at "Dan's Garage"
- Mastered by Stephen Marcussen

== Charts ==
Chart performance for The Rembrandts
Chart (1990–1991)	Peak position
Australian Albums (ARIA)	93
Austrian Albums (Ö3 Austria)	23
Canada Top Albums/CDs (RPM)	49
German Albums (Offizielle Top 100)	12
Swedish Albums (Sverigetopplistan)	43
US Billboard 200	88
