= Untitled (The Rembrandts album) =

Studio album by The Rembrandts
- Released: August 25, 1992
- Genre: Pop rock; jangle pop; power pop; baroque pop
- Length: 53:26
- Label: East West; Atco
- Producer: The Rembrandts

The Rembrandts chronology
The Rembrandts (1990)	Untitled (1992)	L.P. (1995)

Singles from Untitled
- 1. "Johnny Have You Seen Her?" Released: 1992; 2. "Maybe Tomorrow" Released: 1992; 3. "Rollin' Down The Hill (USA & Spain)" Released: 1992; 4. "Chase The Clouds Away (USA only)" Released: 1993; 5. "Waiting To Be Opened (Europe only)" Released: 1993

Professional ratings
Review scores
Source	Rating
AllMusic	3/5 stars
The Encyclopedia of Popular Music	2/5 stars

Untitled is the second album by the American pop rock duo The Rembrandts. It was released in 1992 on East West Records.

"Johnny, Have You Seen Her?" peaked at No. 54 on the Billboard Hot 100 singles chart, but unlike the duo's previous and subsequent albums, Untitled failed to chart in the U.S.

== Critical reception ==
AllMusic wrote that "while the subject matter – mainly songs of yearning and lost love – hasn't changed much since the debut, the subtle string arrangements and minor-key melodies blend quite nicely, bringing out the themes more fully." The Los Angeles Times called the album "a lush Beatles-influenced collection." Phoenix New Times wrote that, occasionally, the band's "considerable pop smarts give way to cutesy pretension."

== Track listing ==
All songs written by The Rembrandts except as indicated.

1. "Johnny Have You Seen Her?"
2. "Maybe Tomorrow"
3. "Rollin' Down the Hill"
4. "One Horse Town" (The Rembrandts, Michael Tienken)
5. "Sweet Virginia"
6. "Chase the Clouds Away"
7. "Hang On to Forever"
8. "Hang On, Clementine!"
9. "Waiting to Be Opened"
10. "I'll Come Callin'" (The Rembrandts, Tienken)
11. "The Deepest End"
12. "In the Back of Your Mind"

== Personnel ==
per liner notes

The Rembrandts

- Danny Wilde – vocals, bass guitar, electric and acoustic guitar, mandolin, harmonica, synthesizer; shovel head and lead guitar (tracks 1 and 6)
- Phil Solem – vocals, lead guitar, electric rhythm guitar, acoustic guitar, banjo, honky-tonk piano, synthesizer; percussion and bass guitar (track 4)

Additional musicians

- Pat Mastelotto – drums, percussion
- David "Cap'n Bobcat" Zeman – hammond organ, piano, synthesizer

Guest musicians

- Danny Tate – accordion
- Joe Englund – cello
- Kim Bullard – clavinet
- Mark Johnson – double bass

Production

- The Rembrandts – arrangement, recording, production
- Larry Vigon – art direction, design
- Brian Jackson – design
- Artik L.A., David Cowles – illustration
- George Ghiz – management
- Stephen Marcussen – mastering
- Mike Stock, The Shack Mutes – mixing assisted by
- David Roth – photography
- Pat Mastelotto, Paul "Jilly" Mitchell – drum Sounds Assisted By

== Charts ==
=== Weekly charts ===
Chart (1992)	Peak position
Australian Albums (ARIA)	158
