= Spin This =

Studio album by Danny Wilde + The Rembrandts
- Released: 28 April 1998
- Genre: Pop rock, jangle pop, alternative rock
- Length: 38:58
- Label: Elektra
- Producer: Gavin MacKillop, Danny Wilde

Danny Wilde + The Rembrandts chronology
LP (1995)	Spin This (1998)	Lost Together (2001)

Professional ratings
Review scores
Source	Rating
AllMusic	4/5 stars
The Encyclopedia of Popular Music	3/5 stars

Spin This is a solo album by The Rembrandts' Danny Wilde, released by Elektra Records in 1998. The album is credited to "Danny Wilde + The Rembrandts." As a result, the album is still technically a full Rembrandts album, despite being released during the band's first split.

Van Dyke Parks contributed arrangements to a couple of songs.

== Critical reception ==
AllMusic called the album "another collection of finely crafted pop songs."

== Track listing ==
All songs written by Danny Wilde except as indicated.

1. "Shakespeare's Tragedy" (Wilde, Graham Edwards)
2. "Long Walk Back" (Wilde, Jesse Valenzuela)
3. "Out of Time" (Wilde, Edwards, Nick Trevisick, Charlie Midnight)
4. "Wishin' Well" (Wilde, Edwards)
5. "Summertime"
6. "Tomorrow's Mine"
7. "Get it Right"
8. "Eloise" (Wilde, Edwards)
9. "This Close to Heaven"
10. "Beautiful Thing"

== Personnel ==
per liner notes

- Danny Wilde – lead vocals, guitar; Hammond B3 (track 2); production and piano (track 6)
- Graham Edwards – bass, vocals
- Dorian Crozier – drums, vocals
- Michael Ramos – keyboards
- Mark Karan – guitar
- Van Dyke Parks – orchestra arrangements, conductor (tracks 1, 5)
- Nick Trevisick – programming, fuzz guitar, keyboards (track 3)
- Pat Mastelotto – drums (track 6)
- Lauren Christy – piano (track 9)
- Gavin MacKillop – production, engineering and mixing
- Jeff Robinson – additional engineering, 2nd engineer
- Paul Mitchell – additional engineering, recording and engineering
- Osie Bowe, Charles Nasser and Trent – 2nd engineer
- Michael Frondelli – recording
- George Ghiz/Mogul Entertainment group – management
- Jill Carlson and Tami Chikami – assistant
- Tom DaSavia – A&R
- Carrie McConkey – production coordinator
- Vigon/Ellis – art direction and design
- Honst Stasny – photography
