= The Boyfriend (album) =

Studio album by Danny Wilde
- Released: 1986
- Genre: Pop rock, power pop
- Length: 39:32
- Label: Island
- Producer: Peter Coleman

Danny Wilde chronology
The Boyfriend (1986)	Any Man's Hunger (1988)

The Boyfriend is the 1986 debut solo album from Danny Wilde. It was released by Island Records. The track "Isn't it Enough" was the only single to make it on to the pop/rock charts. The same song would also be covered a year later by singer-songwriter Patty Smyth (formerly of Scandal), for her solo debut outing Never Enough.

The album was never released onto CD due to Wilde's departure from Island Records. The cassette is rare and hard to find. Many fans find this album to be the best Wilde album due to its melodic pop-rock tracks and songwriting. Rock Candy Records reissued the album on CD in September 2022

== Track listing ==
- All songs written by Danny Wilde, except where noted.
1. "Isn't it Enough" - 4:14 (Wilde, Nick Trevisick)
2. "Body to Body" - 4:06 (Wilde, Sig Emerson)
3. "Restless Heart" - 4:10
4. "Angel (This Must Be Heaven)" - 4:06
5. "Hold Out for Me" - 3:50 (Wilde, Trevisick)
6. "The Sound of My Heart Breaking" - 4:37
7. "Katherine" - 3:46 (Wilde, Trevisick)
8. "He Can Have You" - 4:12
9. "Criminal Mind" - 3:47
10. "The Boyfriend" - 2:26 (Wilde, M. Sauve)

== Trivia ==
The band The Quest has covered the song "The Boyfriend" during some live concerts.
