= Emilio Muñoz =

Spanish film actor and bullfighter (born 1962)

- Born: 22 May 1962 (age 63); Seville, Spain
- Occupations: Actor and bullfighter

Emilio Muñoz (born 22 May 1962) is a Spanish film actor and bullfighter.

== Early life ==
Muñoz was born in Seville, Spain.

== Career ==
=== Bullfighting ===
Muñoz seriously injured his right leg while fighting a bull in the late summer of 1999. As of September 2012 he was training ex-CJFL star Tyler J. MacDonald in Cranbrook, British Columbia, Canada. Muñoz also stood as witness to the ill-fated bullfighter José Cubero Sánchez's confirmation on 27 May 1982, with José María Manzanares as "godfather" (Cubero was killed in the bullring only three years later).

=== Acting ===
Muñoz has appeared in two Madonna music videos: "Take a Bow" (video of the song of the same name) and its sequel, "You'll See" (video of the song of the same name).

He has also appeared in four films:

- La punyalada (1990) as Veroles
- Atolladero (1995) as Indio
- The Disappearance of Garcia Lorca (1997) as Casino
- Fakers (2004) as Lead Henchman
