= List of number-one albums of 1995 (Canada) =

These are the Canadian number-one albums of 1995. The chart was compiled and published by RPM every Monday.

Issue date	Album	Artist
January 7	Live at the BBC	The Beatles
January 14	Vitalogy	Pearl Jam
January 23	Dookie	Green Day
January 30	Dookie	Green Day
February 6	Dookie	Green Day
February 13	Dookie	Green Day
February 20	Dookie	Green Day
February 27	Dookie	Green Day
March 6	Dookie	Green Day
March 13	Dookie	Green Day
March 20	Greatest Hits	Bruce Springsteen
March 27	Greatest Hits	Bruce Springsteen
April 3	Greatest Hits	Bruce Springsteen
April 10	Greatest Hits	Bruce Springsteen
April 17	Greatest Hits	Bruce Springsteen
April 24	Medusa	Annie Lennox
May 1	Greatest Hits	Bruce Springsteen
May 8	Throwing Copper	Live
May 15	Throwing Copper	Live
May 22	Throwing Copper	Live
May 29	Throwing Copper	Live
June 5	Throwing Copper	Live
June 12	Throwing Copper	Live
June 19	P•U•L•S•E	Pink Floyd
June 26	P•U•L•S•E	Pink Floyd
July 3	HIStory: Past, Present and Future, Book I	Michael Jackson
July 10	HIStory: Past, Present and Future, Book I	Michael Jackson
July 17	HIStory: Past, Present and Future, Book I	Michael Jackson
July 24	HIStory: Past, Present and Future, Book I	Michael Jackson
July 31	HIStory: Past, Present and Future, Book I	Michael Jackson
August 7	HIStory: Past, Present and Future, Book I	Michael Jackson
August 14	These Days	Bon Jovi
August 21	Cracked Rear View	Hootie & the Blowfish
August 28	Cracked Rear View	Hootie & the Blowfish
September 4	Cracked Rear View	Hootie & the Blowfish
September 11	Dangerous Minds	Soundtrack
September 18	Dangerous Minds	Soundtrack
September 25	Much Dance Mix '95	Various Artists
October 2	Much Dance Mix '95	Various Artists
October 9	Much Dance Mix '95	Various Artists
October 16	Much Dance Mix '95	Various Artists
October 23	Much Dance Mix '95	Various Artists
October 30	Jagged Little Pill	Alanis Morissette
November 6	Jagged Little Pill	Alanis Morissette
November 13	Jagged Little Pill	Alanis Morissette
November 20	Jagged Little Pill	Alanis Morissette
November 27	Stripped	The Rolling Stones
December 4	Anthology 1	The Beatles
December 11	Anthology 1	The Beatles
December 18	Anthology 1	The Beatles

== See also ==
- List of Canadian number-one singles of 1995
