= List of Cash Box Top 100 number-one singles of 1995 =

These are the singles that reached number one on the Top 100 Singles chart in 1995 as published by Cash Box magazine.

Key
†	Indicates best-performing single of 1995

Issue date	Song	Artist
January 7	"On Bended Knee"	Boyz II Men
January 14	"On Bended Knee"	Boyz II Men
January 21	"On Bended Knee"	Boyz II Men
January 28	"On Bended Knee"	Boyz II Men
February 4	"On Bended Knee"	Boyz II Men
February 11	"On Bended Knee"	Boyz II Men
February 18	"Take a Bow"	Madonna
February 25	"Take a Bow"	Madonna
March 4	"Take a Bow"	Madonna
March 11	"Take a Bow"	Madonna
March 18	"Take a Bow"	Madonna
March 25	"Take a Bow"	Madonna
April 1	"Take a Bow"	Madonna
April 8	"Take a Bow"	Madonna
April 15	"I Know"	Dionne Farris
April 22	"I Know"	Dionne Farris
April 29	"I Know"	Dionne Farris
May 6	"I Know"	Dionne Farris
May 13	"I Know"	Dionne Farris
May 20	"I Know"	Dionne Farris
May 27	"Water Runs Dry"	Boyz II Men
June 3	"Water Runs Dry"	Boyz II Men
June 10	"Water Runs Dry"	Boyz II Men
June 17	"Water Runs Dry"	Boyz II Men
June 24	"Water Runs Dry"	Boyz II Men
July 1	"Have You Ever Really Loved a Woman?"	Bryan Adams
July 8	"Waterfalls"	TLC
July 15	"Waterfalls"	TLC
July 22	"Waterfalls"	TLC
July 29	"Waterfalls"	TLC
August 5	"Waterfalls"	TLC
August 12	"Waterfalls"	TLC
August 19	"Waterfalls"	TLC
August 26	"Kiss from a Rose" †	Seal
September 2	"You Are Not Alone"	Michael Jackson
September 9	"You Are Not Alone"	Michael Jackson
September 16	"Gangsta's Paradise"	Coolio featuring L.V.
September 23	"Gangsta's Paradise"	Coolio featuring L.V.
September 30	"Gangsta's Paradise"	Coolio featuring L.V.
October 7	"Fantasy"	Mariah Carey
October 14	"Fantasy"	Mariah Carey
October 21	"Fantasy"	Mariah Carey
October 28	"Fantasy"	Mariah Carey
November 4	"Fantasy"	Mariah Carey
November 11	"Fantasy"	Mariah Carey
November 18	"Fantasy"	Mariah Carey
November 25	"Fantasy"	Mariah Carey
December 2	"Fantasy"	Mariah Carey
December 9	"One Sweet Day"	Mariah Carey & Boyz II Men
December 16	"One Sweet Day"	Mariah Carey & Boyz II Men
December 23	"One Sweet Day"	Mariah Carey & Boyz II Men
December 30	"One Sweet Day"	Mariah Carey & Boyz II Men

== See also ==
- 1995 in music
- List of Hot 100 number-one singles of 1995 (U.S.)
