= Take a Bow (Madonna song) =

1994 single by Madonna

Single by Madonna

from the album Bedtime Stories
- B-side: "Take a Bow" (InDaSoul Mix)
- Released: December 6, 1994
- Recorded: 1994
- Studio: The Hit Factory (New York City)
- Genre: Pop; R&B; soul
- Length: 5:21
- Label: Maverick; Sire; Warner Bros.
- Songwriters: Madonna; Kenneth Edmonds
- Producers: Madonna; Babyface

Madonna singles chronology
| "Secret" (1994) | "Take a Bow" (1994) | "Bedtime Story" (1995) |

Music video
- "Take a Bow" on YouTube

"Take a Bow" is a song by American singer Madonna from her sixth studio album, Bedtime Stories (1994). It was released as the album's second single on December 6, 1994, by Maverick Records. It is a midtempo pop ballad written and produced by Madonna and Babyface. Following the sexually explicit persona portrayed by Madonna on her previous 1992 album, Erotica, she wanted to tone down her image for Bedtime Stories. Experimenting with a new musical direction and a more radio-friendly sound, Madonna decided to collaborate with Babyface, whose work with other musicians had impressed her. "Take a Bow" was developed after she listened to the basic beat and chords of a piece of music composed by him.

Backed by a full orchestra, "Take a Bow" was the first time that Babyface had worked with live strings, per Madonna's suggestion. Its lyrics are about disillusionment in a one-sided romance. It received acclaim from music critics, who praised its soulful, poetic lyrics, production, and Madonna's vocal performance. The single topped the US Billboard Hot 100 chart for seven weeks, becoming Madonna's 11th chart-topper. She broke Carole King's three-decade-long record as the female songwriter with the most number-one songs. "Take a Bow" also reached number one in Canada and the top ten in Finland, Switzerland, and New Zealand. However, it became her first single to miss the UK Singles Chart top ten since 1984, peaking at number 16.

The music video for "Take a Bow" was directed by Michael Haussman, and was filmed in Ronda, Spain. The video depicts Madonna as a bullfighter's (played by real-life Spanish bullfighter Emilio Muñoz) neglected lover, yearning for his love. It won the Best Female Video award at the 1995 MTV Video Music Awards. Journalistic and academic analysis of the video included its plotline, usage of religious iconography, themes and motifs of feminism and submission, as well as its impact on contemporary music videos. In order to promote Bedtime Stories, Madonna performed "Take a Bow" on a few occasions, including live with Babyface at the 1995 American Music Awards. The song was later included in her compilation albums Something to Remember (1995), GHV2 (2001), and Celebration (2009). She also performed the song to the setlist of her Rebel Heart Tour (2015-2016), her one-off concert Madonna: Tears of a Clown (2016), and on The Celebration Tour (2023-2024).

== Background and release ==
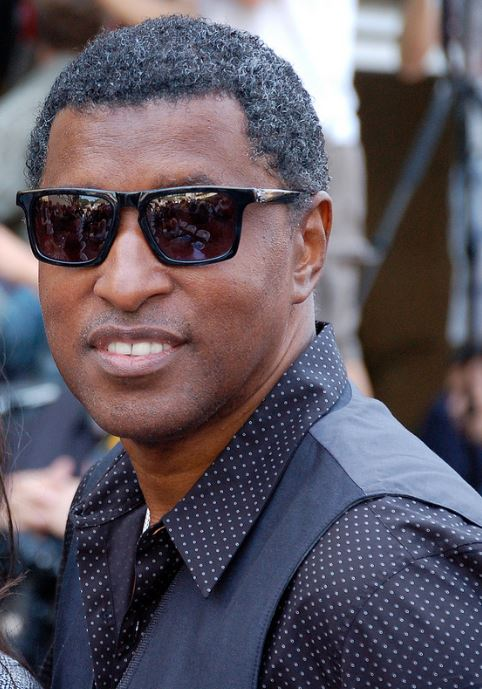
Babyface co-wrote and co-produced "Take a Bow" with Madonna.

Following the release of Madonna's first book publication, Sex, the erotic thriller, Body of Evidence, her fifth studio album, Erotica, as well as her infamous TV interview with David Letterman in the early-to-mid 1990s, the media and public's backlash against Madonna's overtly sexual image was at a peak. Madonna wanted to tone down her explicit image. Her first attempt was to release the tender ballad "I'll Remember" from the soundtrack of the film With Honors. Musically, she wanted to move in a new musical direction and started exploring new-jack R&B styles with a generally mainstream, radio-friendly sound. This would eventually become her sixth studio album, Bedtime Stories, released in October 1994. In author Fred Bronson's The Billboard Book of Number 1 Hits, Madonna explained:

The idea going in was to juxtapose my singing style with a hardcore hip-hop sensibility and have the finished product still sound like a Madonna record. I began the process by meeting with the hip-hop producers whose work I most admired. It was important, if I were to use a variety of collaborators, that the end product sound cohesive and thematically whole. I wasn't interested in the variety pack approach.

After searching for prospective collaborators, Madonna chose to work with Babyface, whose previous work with artists like Whitney Houston, Boyz II Men, and Toni Braxton had resulted in successful smooth R&B songs. She was also fond of Babyface's song, "When Can I See You" from his third studio album For the Cool in You (1994). The singer's management called Babyface to set up a meeting and see if they wanted to work together. Once met, both were surprised by their camaraderie and wanted to write songs. Madonna came over to Babyface's house and after a couple of days they came up with two songs. One of them was based on a piece of music composed by Babyface, but he was not sure about its musical direction. He made Madonna listen to the composition, and she found a way to take the song forward. Babyface clarified that "[i]t was just a beat and the chords. From there we collaborated and built it up... I was living in Beverly Hills and I created a little studio in my house, so she came over there to write." Together they agreed that the first line of the song should be its title, and "Take a Bow" was written. The words were never repeated in the track again.

"Take a Bow" was released as the second single from Bedtime Stories on December 6, 1994, following "Secret". The maxi single release of the song included two remixes. According to Jose F. Promis of AllMusic, the first remix, known as the "In Da Soul" mix, gives the ballad a funkier, more urban feel while the second remix, known as the "Silky Soul Mix", is a little more "quiet storm" and "melancholy" than the first. On December 17, 2021, Madonna released the "Take a Bow" EP to all digital and streaming outlets.

== Recording and composition ==
"Take a Bow" was recorded at The Hit Factory studios, New York, and was mastered and mixed at Sterling Sound Studios, New York. Babyface recalled that he was nervous about recording with Madonna, since he feared that Madonna was a "perfectionist" in the studio, and that would ultimately be time-consuming for the whole process. However, it was one of the fastest recording and mixing, each brought lyrics and melodies, singing them back and forth. The song was backed by full orchestral strings and was also the first time that Babyface had worked with live strings. He recalled that using strings in the song was "[Madonna's] suggestion, and it was Nellee Hooper who actually [arranged the strings]. She had worked with them before but for me it was a new experience". Along with Hooper, Jessie Leavey, Craig Armstrong and Suzie Katayama also worked on the strings and conducting.

"Take a Bow"
A 27 second sample of the song, featuring Madonna singing the opening verses. The sample presents the orchestra used in the background, as well as Babyface's vocals during the second verse.

"Take a Bow" was written and produced by Madonna and Babyface, and is a midtempo pop, R&B, and soul ballad with Japanese musical influences, like that of Kyu Sakamoto's 1961 song, "Sukiyaki". It begins with sounds of pentatonic strings, giving the impression of Chinese or Japanese opera. The verses consist of a descending chord sequence, containing twists at the end. Madonna's vocals are in a "sleepy languid mood" that is characteristic of the songs from Bedtime Stories. The lyrics during the chorus talk about Madonna saying goodbye to a lover, who had taken her for granted. The title plays upon the verse in the song "all the world is a stage and everyone has their part", a reference to a line by William Shakespeare in his play As You Like It, "All the world's a stage, and all the men and women mere players".

In his book Madonna: An Intimate Biography, author J. Randy Taraborrelli describes the song as a "somber, sarcastic, all-the-world's-a-stage song about unrequited love... [about a subject] whose phoniness might have fooled everyone else, but not her." He goes on to say that in the song Madonna tells the subject of her unrequited love to take a bow for "rendering a great, transparent performance in life and love." Alongside the betrayal of her lover, the lyrics also talk about Madonna trying to understand the reasons behind adultery. As the song progresses, the listener realizes that through the lyrics the singer was talking about herself—"One lonely star and you don't know who you are". According to the sheet music published by Alfred Music at Musicnotes.com, the song has a moderate calypso feel and is set in the time signature of common time and progresses in 80 beats per minute. This song is in the key of A♭ major with Madonna's vocal ranging from E♭_{3} to C_{5}. "Take a Bow" contains a basic sequence of A♭–B♭m_{7}/E♭–A♭–F♭maj_{7} during the opening strings, and A♭–A♭/G♭–Fm_{7} during the verses as its chord progression.

== Critical reception ==
A gorgeous melancholy ballad of unrequitted love, with the object of the singer's affection being someone who hides behind a role playing mask which only she can see... [Babyface] makes [the song] virtually a duet with Madonna, echoing her words with his high tenor wafting dreamily behind her, and the song's minimalist arrangement is impeccably elegant.

— Author Steve Sullivan's review of "Take a Bow" in Encyclopedia of Great Popular Song Recordings, Volume 2

Upon release, "Take a Bow" received general acclaim from critics. Peter Calvin from The Advocate praised the lyrical flow of the song, saying that the "effect is truly heartbreaking. The song... shows that ultimately Madonna... is just like you and me". Stephen Thomas Erlewine of AllMusic referred to "Take a Bow" as "tremendous", listing it as one of the best songs from Bedtime Stories and stating that it "slowly works its melodies into the subconscious as the bass pulses". He goes on to say that it "offer[s] an antidote to Erotica, which was filled with deep but cold grooves". Louis Virtel, from The Backlot, placed "Take a Bow" at number 27 of his list "The 100 Greatest Madonna Songs". He wrote, "Madonna's most successful single to date is a melancholic evisceration of a lover's artifice, and its hopeless plain-spokenness makes it one of the finest examples of 90s balladry". J. D. Considine of The Baltimore Sun stated that the song, about "innocent romance" has a "gently cascading melody". In his review of Bedtime Stories, Billboard's Paul Verna called it a "holiday feast for Top 40, rhythm crossover, and AC". Reviewing the single, Billboard gave the single a particularly positive review; "The follow-up to the top five smash 'Secret' [...] is as perfect as top 40 fare gets. This single has a delightful, immediately memorable melody and chorus, engaging romance-novel lyrics and a lead vocal that is both sweet and quietly soulful. A lovely way for [Madonna] to kick out '95".

In his 2011 review of Bedtime Stories, Brett Callwood of the Detroit Metro Times called the song "spectacular". Writing for Entertainment Weekly, Chuck Arnold called it "one of the most elegant, most un-Madonna-sounding things she’s ever done". While ranking Madonna's singles, Jude Rogers from The Guardian placed the track at number 38, calling it a "compellingly cinematic orchestral drama". Matthew Jacobs, from The Huffington Post, placed it at number 19 of his list "The Definitive Ranking Of Madonna Singles", calling it her "most poetic ballad". Music writer James Masterton said it is "arguably one of Madonna's best records for ages". Pan-European magazine Music & Media deemed it "an elegant ballad, a perfect alternative to prosaic lullabies." They added, "The intro could be mistaken for jingle bells and fits in well with the season." A reviewer from Music Week gave it five out of five, calling it "an old-fashioned ballad, full of sweeping violin and vaguely oriental sounds. A natural single for Christmas." John Kilgo from The Network Forty described it as "sexy and smooth". Stuart Bailie from NME viewed it as "a return to the True Blue era of boss tunes, a swooning, goose-feather production that's clearly in awe of KD Lang's Ingenue. Maddy paraphrases Shakespeare and rewrite 'Send In the Clowns'; another curtain call beckons." Another NME editor, Alex Needham, opined it was a "gorgeously constructed song by any standards".

NPR Multimedia senior producer Keith Jenkins gave a positive review of the song, stating that it "washes over you and gets your blood boiling. You may not walk on water after hearing it, but you may want to get your focus back by walking on broken glass". Enio Chiola of PopMatters, included the song on his list of "Top 15 Madonna Singles of All Time". He opined that "['Take a Bow'] features a more demure Madonna, confident in her termination of a doomed relationship, and the music is accented by characteristically Asian orchestration and lovely poetic lyrics", concluding that "[Madonna] quickly learned that the way back into the public's collective hearts was to focus more attention on the music than on the frankness of her sexual image". Encyclopedia Madonnica writer Matthew Rettenmund called it a "sentimental ballad with showbiz theme" while finding similarities in the song to that of "Superstar" by The Carpenters. Rikky Rooksby, author of The Complete Guide to the Music of Madonna, was less impressed with the track. Although he felt that it sounded "shockingly normal" after the "ambient 'Bedtime Story'", he found the song's length as over-long and deduced it to be "communica[ting] no sense whatsoever of the pain of a real goodbye." Slant Magazine's Sal Cinquemani, called it "syrupy and bittersweet". In his book, Madonna: An Intimate Biography, J. Randy Taraborrelli called it a "melancholy and beautifully executed ballad". James Hunter from Vibe deemed it "a New Soul masterpiece". Author Chris Wade wrote in his book The Music of Madonna that "Take a Bow" was a standout from the album. He complimented Madonna and Babyface's vocals, while calling the music "stunning". He declared it as one of the singer's "purest songs, totally free of any gimmicks, self-consciousness or knowing sexual references; a graceful end to the album."

== Chart performance ==
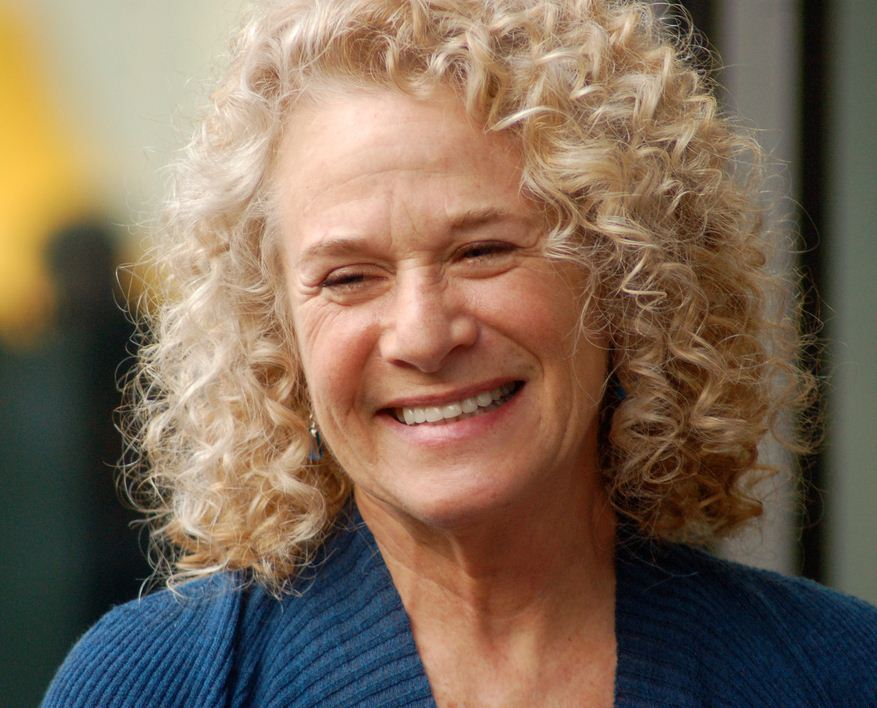
With "Take a Bow" topping the Billboard Hot 100, Madonna replaced Carole King as the woman who had written the most number-one songs.

"Take a Bow" was a commercial success in the United States, topping the Billboard Hot 100 chart. It was Madonna's second number-one single since Billboard started using Nielsen SoundScan and Nielsen BDS data to tabulate its charts; the first being "This Used to Be My Playground". Topping the chart for seven weeks, it is her longest-running number-one on this chart. It was her 11th single to top the Billboard Hot 100 and her 23rd top five entry; both records for a female artist. With the song reaching number one, she ranked fourth on the list of artists with the most number ones on the chart, behind the Beatles, Elvis Presley and the jointly ranked Michael Jackson and the Supremes. With a writing credit in nine chart-toppers, Madonna became the female songwriter with the most number-one songs at that time, overtaking Carole King, who had held the record for more than 30 years. It charted for a total of 30 weeks, tying with "Borderline" as Madonna's longest-running song on the Hot 100. In 2013, Billboard allocated "Take a Bow" the number four spot on its list of "Madonna's Biggest Billboard Hits", declaring it her second most successful single of the 1990s after "Vogue".

"Take a Bow" became Madonna's fifth number-one on the Adult Contemporary chart in the United States, following "Live to Tell", "La Isla Bonita", "Cherish", and "I'll Remember". It was number one for nine weeks. The song was Madonna's last single to enter the top 40 of the US Hot R&B Singles chart until 2023 when her collaboration with The Weeknd and Playboi Carti, "Popular", peaked at number 14. "Take a Bow" also topped the Top 40/Mainstream chart, and reached number four on the Top 40/Rhythm-Crossover chart. On February 27, 1995, the single was certified gold by the Recording Industry Association of America (RIAA) and according to Billboard, it was one of the best selling singles of 1995, selling 500,000 copies that year. With "Take a Bow"'s certification, Madonna ranked with Janet Jackson as the female artists with the most gold certified singles. In Canada the song debuted at number 85 on the RPM 100 Hit Tracks chart, and reached the top after 11 weeks, becoming Madonna's 12th number-one single in that country. "Take a Bow" charted for 25 weeks and placed at number three on the RPM year-end ranking. It also reached number one on the RPM Adult Contemporary chart.

"Take a Bow" peaked at number 16 on the UK Singles Chart. This ended Madonna's record-holding string of 35 consecutive top-ten singles on the chart, from "Like a Virgin" (1984) to "Secret" (1994). According to the Official Charts Company, the single has sold 102,739 copies in the United Kingdom, as of August 2008. "It should be a source of shame akin to Britain's poisonous beef and pathetic railways that the dreadful 'Hanky Panky' was purchased in such droves that it reached Number 2"," grumbled Stuart Maconie, "whilst only buying sufficient of the wonderful 'Take a Bow' to propel it to a measly Number 16." In Australia, "Take a Bow" debuted on the ARIA Singles Chart at number 21 on December 25, 1994, eventually peaking at number 15. It remained on the chart for 17 weeks. The song peaked at number two on the Italian Singles Chart; number eight on the Swiss Singles Chart; and number nine on the New Zealand Singles Chart, spending 13 weeks on the latter chart.

== Music video ==
=== Background and release ===
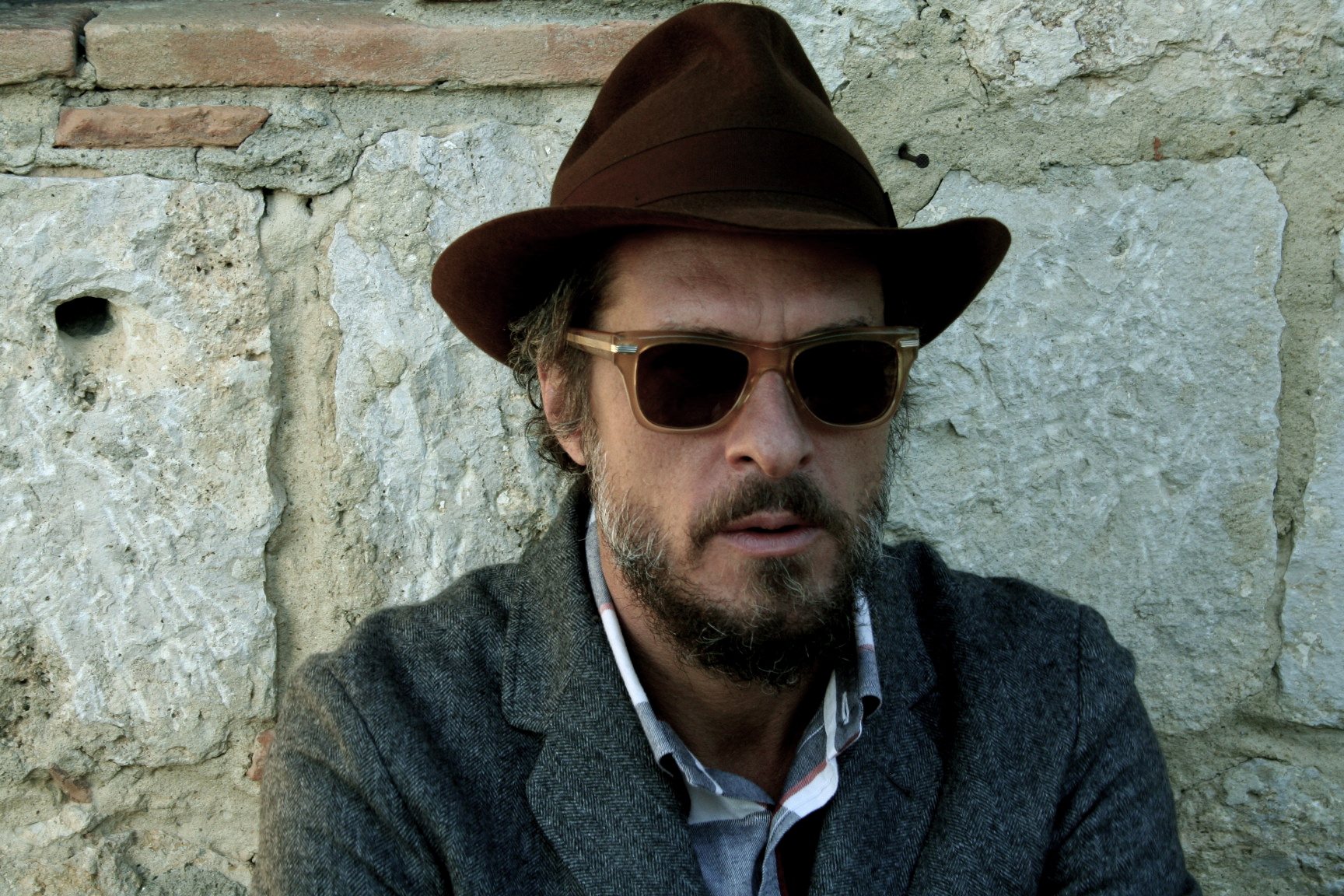
Michael Haussman directed the video.

The music video for "Take a Bow" was directed by Michael Haussman and is a lavish period-style piece, filmed November 3–8, 1994, in Ronda and in the bullring of Antequera, Spain. In the video, Madonna wore a fitted, classic suit by British fashion designer John Galliano. The costumes worn by Madonna in the video were created by stylist Lori Goldstein, who received the VH1 Fashion and Media Award for best styling. Other designers who provided clothing included Donatella Versace and a then-unknown Christian Louboutin. Madonna had a 1940s style on her, with tight corset, silk dresses and a black-veiled hat. The plot of the video was set in the 1940s, depicting Madonna as a neglected lover of a bullfighter, played by real-life Spanish actor and bullfighter Emilio Muñoz. Madonna's character yearns for the bullfighter's presence, with erotic heartbreak. In an interview with MTV's Kurt Loder on the set of the music video, Madonna said that when she was initially writing "Take a Bow" the inspiration for the song was an actor, but she wanted the male character in the video to be a matador instead because she wanted the video to be about an "obsessive, tragic love story that doesn't work out in the end" and a matador would be more visually effective in expressing the emotion of the song.

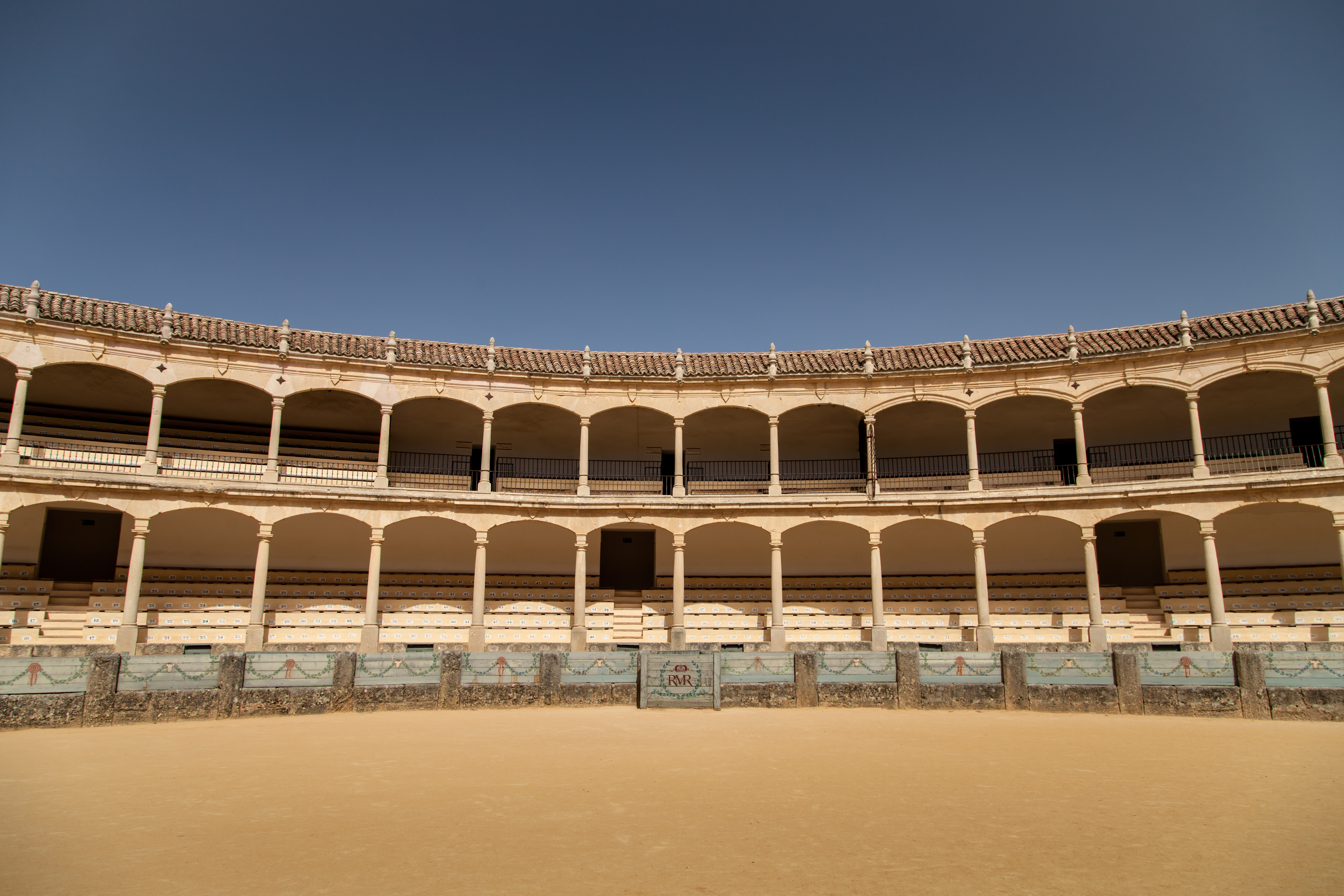
Plaza de Toros de Ronda, where the bullfighting scenes were shot

Madonna arrived in Ronda in November 1994 with a team of 60 people and wanted to shoot at the bullrings in the city. However, her request was rejected by the Real Maestranza de Caballería of Ronda (Royal Cavalry Brotherhood of Ronda), who considered it as a desecration of the arenas if Madonna would have filmed there, since her name at that time was associated with provocative imagery. Also, Madonna had to give up shooting around the city's square due to high economic demands of its owner, former bullfighter Antonio Ordóñez who demanded ₧17 million (US$122,302 in 1994). Later it was clarified that Madonna was refused due to unknown moral reasons from the Brotherhood, who accused the media of making free publicity on the singer's behalf. The refusal generated controversy in Ronda, whose political groups believed that allowing the video to be shot within its precipices would be great promotion for the city. Madonna later obtained permit to shoot inside the palace of the Marquis of Salvatierra. Bullfighting scenes were shot at the Plaza de Toros de Ronda (The Toros Plaza of Ronda), where Muñoz acted alongside three fighting bulls. The actor was paid ₧7 million (US$50,360 in 1994) for participating in the video.

The music video was released on November 22, 1994, on MTV. It was also part of VH1's relaunching promotional campaigns, where the channel used the video in its trio of 30 second commercials titled "The New VH1". The commercial showed a couple in a vintage porsche pulling in front of an ATM cash machine. The man makes a transaction while the woman looks at VH1 playing at a store, showing "Take a Bow". When the man turns back to the car, the woman is gone and can be seen inside the video alongside Madonna, while the singer appears in the car, and utters the tagline: "The new VH1... It'll suck you in". According to Abbey Konowitch, who worked at Madonna's Maverick Records, the singer had a long history with MTV and VH1, and hence was eager to participate in the campaign when asked by VH1 president John Sykes. For filming the commercial, the clothes worn in the video had to be flown in from the different designers. Madonna was also impressed by the technology used in the commercial for transposing the woman and herself together.

=== Synopsis and reception ===
Madonna after she has been left physically abused by the torero in the video. The scenes were described by author Georges-Claude Guilbert as "demoralizing".

The music video begins showing Madonna, the torero (Muñoz), and the townspeople preparing for, then attending, a bullfight. A secondary staging in the video presents Madonna standing or sitting near a television set in a room (lit by a single light source from above), while a third staging depicts Madonna writhing around on a bed in her underwear as she watches Muñoz on the television. In the bullring, the torero kills the bull and then comes home and physically and emotionally abuses Madonna. The video can be viewed as a statement on classism, supposing the bullfighter feels threatened and angered by the aristocrat's station, resulting in his physically abusing and then coldly abandoning her.

The style of the music video has been compared to Spanish director Pedro Almodóvar's 1986 film Matador, starring Antonio Banderas. Madonna requested that Haussman give the video a Spanish theme because, at the time, she was lobbying for the role of Eva Perón in the film version of Evita. She subsequently sent a copy of the video to director Alan Parker as a way of "auditioning" for the role. Madonna eventually won the role of Perón. The music video for Madonna's 1995 single "You'll See" is considered a follow-up to the "Take a Bow" music video, as Madonna and Emilio Muñoz reprise their roles. In that video Madonna's character walks out on Munoz's (bullfighter) character, leaving him behind in despair. Madonna's character is then seen on the train and later on a plane, while Munoz's character tries to catch up with her in vain.

The video generated controversy with animal rights activists who accused the singer of glorifying bullfighting. In Australia, music video program Video Hits ran a ticker along the bottom of the screen when the video was playing, stating that the producers of the program did not endorse the glorification of the sport portrayed in the video, while ABC TV video program Rage simply refused to play the video at all during their G-rated Top 50 program. Madonna won Best Female Video honors at the 1995 MTV Video Music Awards for the "Take a Bow" music video. It was also nominated for Best Art Direction in a Video, but lost to Michael Jackson and Janet Jackson's "Scream". The video also came in at number 27 on VH1's 50 Sexiest Video Moments. In 2012, the television program Extra included "Take a Bow" on their list of "The 10 Sexiest Madonna Music Videos." It can also be found on the Madonna compilations, The Video Collection 93:99 (1999) and Celebration: The Video Collection (2009).

=== Analysis and impact ===
Like some of Madonna's previous music videos, such as "La Isla Bonita" and "Like a Prayer", religious imagery plays a big role in the music video. In the book Madonna's Drowned Worlds the use of Catholic imagery in the video is discussed. Author Santiago Fouz-Hernández points out that unlike Madonna's previous music videos, much of the religious imagery is associated with the torero, not Madonna, due to the fact that religious images are a strong part of the bullfighting ritual. It has also been argued that in the video Madonna "subverts the gender structure and masculine subjectivity implicit in traditional bullfighting." This is achieved through the "feminization of the matador and the emphasis on Madonna's character" and also through Madonna's "dominant gaze" as she watches the matador perform."

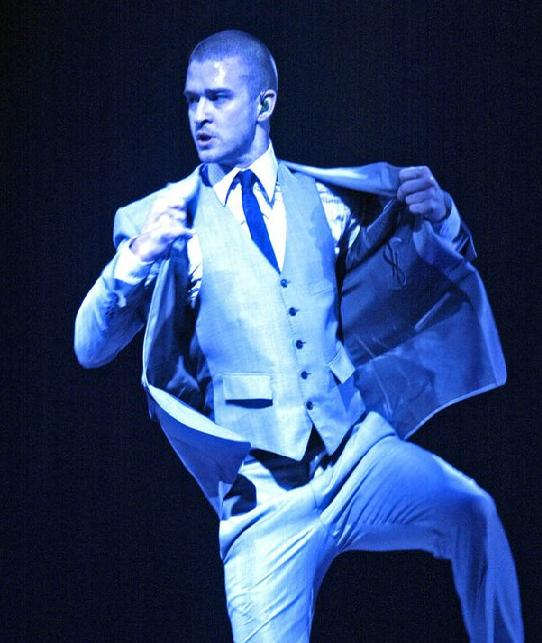
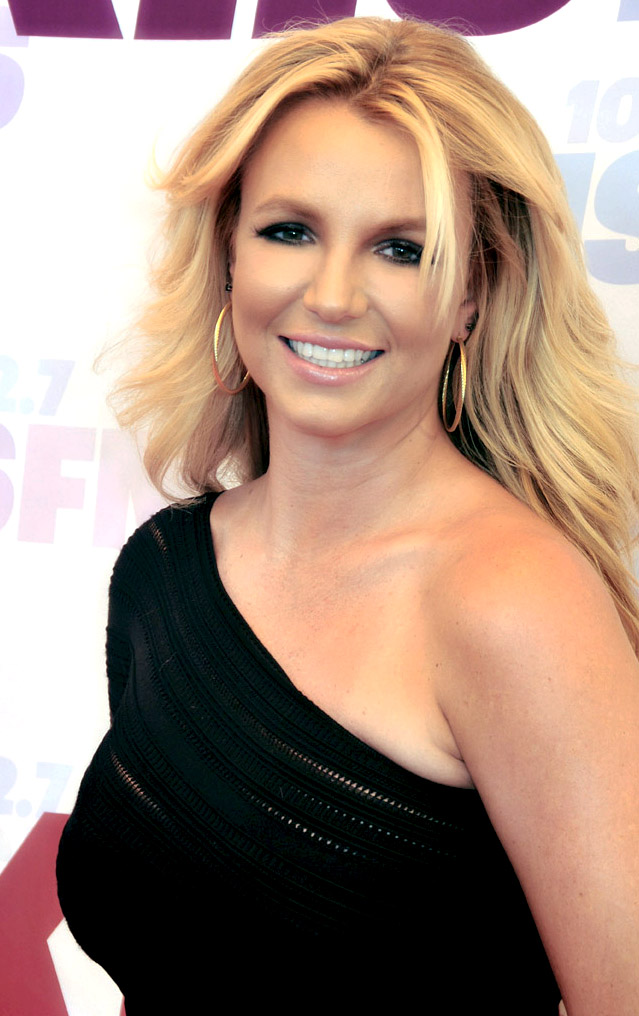
The music video for "Take a Bow" inspired Justin Timberlake's video for "SexyBack" (2006) and was later tributed by Britney Spears' video for "Radar" (2009).

Roger Beebe, one of the authors of Medium Cool: Music Videos from Soundies to Cellphones, noted that the video was an example of "how music, image, and lyrics of a song possesses their own temporality". He explained that the "graceful" nature of the song was contrast to the repetitive scenes in the video, which he felt indicated that the protagonist has long been engaging in the activities, including the "demoralizing sex scenes". In Madonna as Postmodern Myth, author Georges-Claude Guilbert felt the video "defied feminists of the Marilyn Frye and Adrienne Rich variety, who see in the video a disgusting example of passé female submissiveness", and Madonna responded by stating "I don't believe that any organization should dictate to me what I can and cannot do artistically." Guilbert also noted the usage of religious iconography in the video, especially dubious representation of the Virgin. He explained that most of the times Madonna and the torero make love through the television screen, implying that "one of their purity had to be maintained always".

When discussing "Take a Bow", NPR Multimedia senior producer Keith Jenkins said the music video, with its "rich, sensually framed sepia tones", does not "imagination; rather, [it becomes the viewer's] imagination", with Madonna's vision "drill[ed] into your brain, unlocking your waking eye." Carol Vernallis, author of Experiencing Music Video: Aesthetics and Cultural Context, noted that the video exemplified the lyrics of the song. She clarified that the scenes featuring Madonna and Muñoz dressing up and putting on their gloves pointed to storyline and lyrics that appeared later, the lyrics being "all the world loves a clown". During that line Muñoz as the torero is seen with a fatuous expression, which Vernallis deduced as "the beginning of the story of possession and fame" in the video. When Madonna sings "I've always been in love with you", she appeared in the video as sometimes adolescent and sometimes middle-aged. For Vernallis it was not clear if the imagery was literal or figurative of the lyrics, "embodying a lasting affection, as separate parts of Madonna's psyche, or as the exaggerated claims of a groupie." The author also noted that the scene where Madonna pricks her hand with a needle makes her relationship with the torero as more ambiguous. The costumes and melody in the video reminded Vernallis of the 1904 opera Madame Butterfly by Giacomo Puccini although with an inverted plotline. The scenes showing Madonna in an enclosed room with a single light bulb also drew comparisons to Glenn Close's character Alex Forrest in the 1987 psychological thriller film, Fatal Attraction. Another observation by Vernallis was about the power struggle it showed in the video, with Madonna gradually losing and relegated to one corner of the room.

The "Take a Bow" video was a source of inspiration for Justin Timberlake's music video for his 2006 single, "SexyBack". According to Timberlake, he decided to work with director Michael Haussman on his "SexyBack" video because "Take a Bow" is one of his favorite Madonna videos. He went on to say "Even today, I still remember the visuals, the images, how he captured her. A lot of times, Madonna seems like she's the person in control, and in that video, she seemed vulnerable. It was a cool thing to see." According to director Dave Meyers, the music video for Britney Spears' 2009 single "Radar" is a "tribute" to Madonna's "Take a Bow" video. When speaking of Spears and the "Radar" video, Meyers explained, "[we were] looking for a way to take her into a contemporary, classy environment. I felt empowered by referencing Madonna's ['Take a Bow'] video. Britney hasn't done anything like that."

== Live performances, covers and usage in media ==
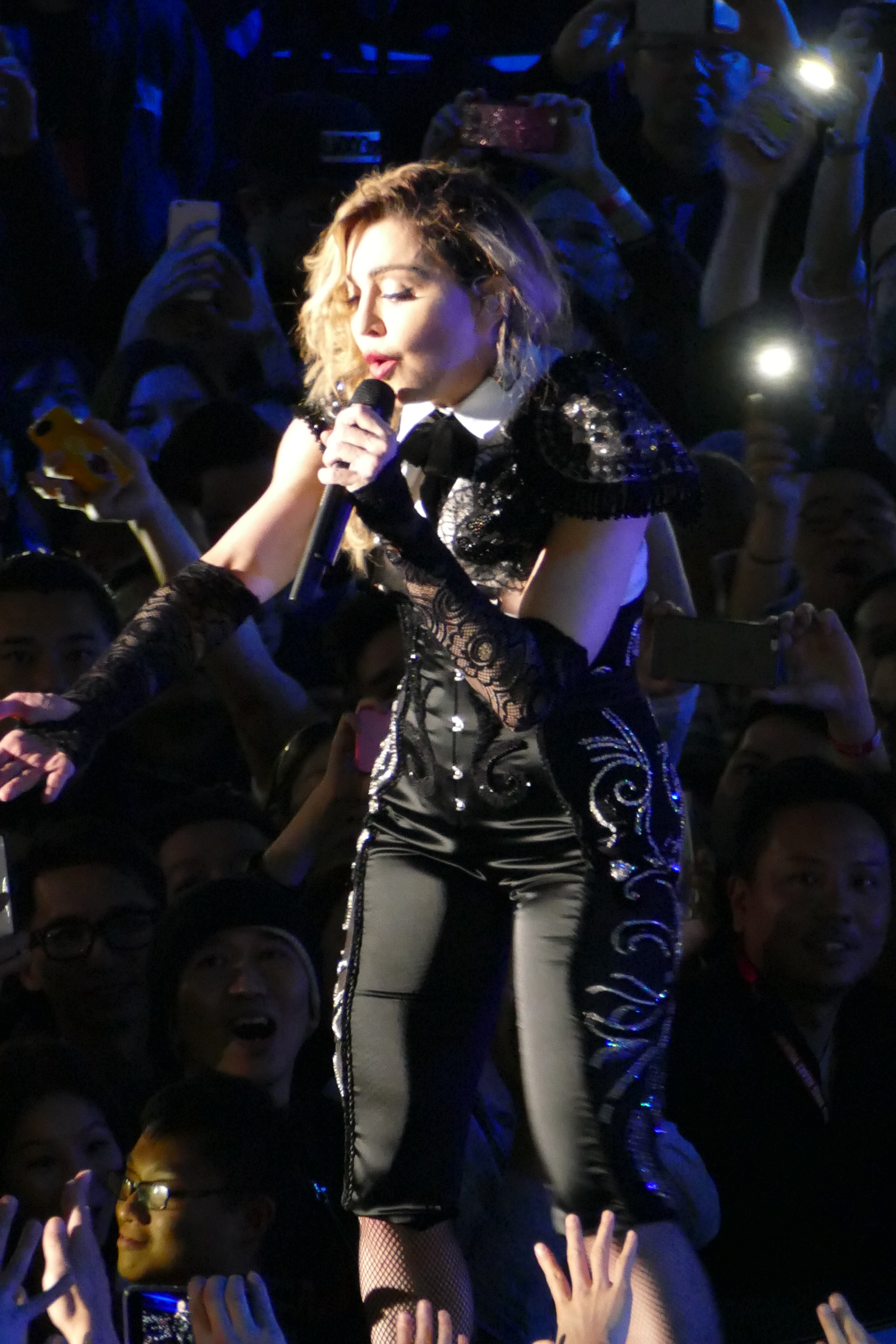
Madonna performing "Take a Bow" during the Taipei stop of her Rebel Heart Tour on February 6, 2016

On January 30, 1995, Madonna performed "Take a Bow" in a cheongsam on the American Music Awards of 1995, accompanied by Babyface and full orchestral strings. Babyface said the performance was terrifying for him: "I was nervous as hell. But you couldn't actually see my legs shaking under the suit. When we finished, she told me she had never been that nervous before. That was crazy to me -- I was thinking, 'You're Madonna, you're on stage all the time!'". On February 18, 1995, Madonna arrived in Europe to promote Bedtime Stories; that same day, she appeared on German TV show Wetten, dass..?, where she was interviewed and performed "Secret" and "Take a Bow". On February 22, 1995, Madonna and Babyface sang the song at the Sanremo Music Festival 1995 in Sanremo, Italy. At the end of the performance, she thanked the audience in Italian, and received a standing ovation. Madonna did rehearse the song for 2004's Re-Invention World Tour, but it was ultimately cut from the setlist and not included in the show.

Madonna had never performed "Take a Bow" on any of her concert tours until February 4, 2016, when she performed the song during the Taipei stop of her Rebel Heart Tour. After the performance, she exclaimed "That was fun! First time ever. Hit a few bad notes, but it felt good to sing it." The singer subsequently performed the song in the other cities during the Asian and Oceanian legs of the Rebel Heart Tour. The live performance of the song was released as a bonus track on the Japanese DVD/Blu-ray edition of Rebel Heart Tour (2017). An acoustic version of "Take a Bow" was performed on Madonna's one-off concert in Melbourne, Madonna: Tears of a Clown. Madonna also performed the song as part of the setlist of The Celebration Tour (2023-2024).

Hong Kong pop singer Sandy Lam recorded a version of the song for her 1997 English language covers album Wonderful World (美妙世界). Serbian pop singer Bebi Dol released Serbian language-cover literally titled "Pokloni se", on her 1995 album Ritam srca. Philippine bossa nova singer Sitti recorded a cover of this song for her second album My Bossa Nova. Korean rock band Jaurim covered the song on their album The Youth Admiration. Trisha Yearwood and Babyface covered the song on CMT Crossroads, which aired on September 21, 2007. Melissa Totten did a Hi-NRG cover for her 2008 dance album Forever Madonna. American pop folk singer Matt Alber plays an acoustic cover on his 2011 album Constant Crows. "Take a Bow" was featured in the final episode of the first season of Friends, "The One Where Rachel Finds Out", when Rachel Green (Jennifer Aniston) goes to the airport to tell Ross Gellar (David Schwimmer) that she knows he is in love with her. "Take a Bow" was used in promos for the final season of Beverly Hills, 90210.

== Track listings and formats ==
- US 7-inch single
1. "Take a Bow" (Album Version) – 5:20
2. "Take a Bow" (InDaSoul Mix) – 4:57
- Japan (Remixes CD single)
1. "Take a Bow" (InDaSoul Mix) – 4:57
2. "Take a Bow" (Album Edit) – 4:31
3. "Take a Bow" (Silky Soul Mix) – 4:11
4. "Take a Bow" (InDaSoul Instrumental) – 4:56
5. "Take a Bow" (Silky Soul Instrumental) – 4:11
6. "Take a Bow" (Album Instrumental) – 5:20
7. "Bedtime Story" (Album Edit) – 4:08
8. "Bedtime Story" (Junior Wet Dream Mix) – 8:33
- US and Australian maxi single
1. "Take a Bow" (InDaSoul Mix) – 4:57
2. "Take a Bow" (InDaSoul Instrumental) – 4:56
3. "Take a Bow" (Album Version) – 5:20
4. "Take a Bow" (Album Instrumental) – 5:20
5. "Take a Bow" (Silky Soul Mix) – 4:11
- UK, European, and Australian CD single
1. "Take a Bow" (Edit) – 4:25
2. "Take a Bow" (Album Version) – 5:20
3. "Take a Bow" (Album Instrumental) – 5:20
- Digital single (2021)
1. "Take a Bow" (Edit) – 4:28
2. "Take a Bow" (InDaSoul Edit) – 4:03
3. "Take a Bow" (Silky Soul Mix) – 4:11
4. "Take a Bow" (InDaSoul Mix) – 4:58
5. "Take a Bow" (Album Version) – 5:21
6. "Take a Bow" (InDaSoul Instrumental) – 4:58
7. "Take a Bow" (Silky Soul Instrumental) – 4:12
8. "Take a Bow" (Instrumental) – 5:21

== Credits and personnel ==
Credits and personnel are adapted from the Bedtime Stories album disc liner notes.

- Madonna – songwriter, record producer, vocals
- Babyface – songwriter, producer, background vocals, drum programming, synthesizer
- Brad Gilderman – recording engineer
- Jon Gass – audio mixing
- Nellee Hooper – strings, conductor
- Jessie Leavey – strings, conductor
- Craig Armstrong – conductor
- Suzie Katayama – conductor
- Fabien Baron – art director
- Patrick Demarchelier – cover art photographer

== Charts ==
=== Weekly charts ===
Weekly chart performance for "Take a Bow"
| Chart (1994–1995) | Peak position |
|---|---|
| Australia (ARIA) | 15 |
| Austria (Ö3 Austria Top 40) | 22 |
| Belgium (Ultratop 50 Flanders) | 19 |
| Brazil (ABPD) | 8 |
| Canada Retail Singles (The Record) | 1 |
| Canada Contemporary Hit Radio (The Record) | 2 |
| Canada Top Singles (RPM) | 1 |
| Canada Adult Contemporary (RPM) | 1 |
| Canada Dance/Urban (RPM) | 13 |
| El Salvador (UPI) | 5 |
| Europe Hot 100 Singles (Music & Media) | 17 |
| Europe Adult Contemporary (Music & Media) | 1 |
| Europe Dance Radio (Music & Media) | 9 |
| Europe Hit Radio Top 40 (Music & Media) | 2 |
| Europe Atlantic Crossovers (Music & Media) | 1 |
| Finland (Suomen virallinen lista) | 3 |
| France (SNEP) | 25 |
| Germany (GfK) | 18 |
| Iceland (Íslenski Listinn Topp 40) | 11 |
| Ireland (IRMA) | 17 |
| Israel (Israeli Singles Chart) | 22 |
| Italy (Musica e dischi) | 2 |
| Netherlands (Dutch Top 40) | 34 |
| Netherlands (Single Top 100) | 39 |
| New Zealand (Recorded Music NZ) | 9 |
| Norway (VG-lista) | 13 |
| Panama (UPI) | 8 |
| Scottish Singles Sales (Official Charts) | 14 |
| Sweden (Sverigetopplistan) | 19 |
| Switzerland (Schweizer Hitparade) | 8 |
| UK Singles (Official Charts) | 16 |
| UK Airplay (Music Week) | 4 |
| US Billboard Hot 100 | 1 |
| US Adult Contemporary (Billboard) | 1 |
| US Adult Pop Airplay (Billboard) | 35 |
| US Dance Singles Sales (Billboard) | 7 |
| US Hot R&B/Hip-Hop Songs (Billboard) | 40 |
| US Pop Airplay (Billboard) | 1 |
| US Rhythmic Airplay (Billboard) | 4 |
| US Cash Box Top 100 | 1 |

2019 chart performance for "Take a Bow"
| Chart (2019) | Peak position |
|---|---|
| UK Physical Singles (OCC) | 87 |

=== Year-end charts ===
1994 year-end chart performance for "Take a Bow"
| Chart (1994) | Position |
|---|---|
| UK Singles (OCC) | 138 |

1995 year-end chart performance for "Take a Bow"
| Chart (1995) | Position |
|---|---|
| Brazil (Brazilian Radio Airplay) | 1 |
| Canada Top Singles (RPM) | 3 |
| Canada Adult Contemporary (RPM) | 4 |
| Europe (European Hot 100 Singles) | 81 |
| Europe (European Hit Radio) | 31 |
| Germany (Media Control) | 73 |
| Switzerland (Schweizer Hitparade) | 37 |
| US Billboard Hot 100 | 8 |
| US Adult Contemporary (Billboard) | 4 |
| US Top 40/Mainstream (Billboard) | 11 |
| US Top 40/Rhythm-Crossover (Billboard) | 20 |
| US Cash Box Top 100 | 2 |

=== Decade-end charts ===
Decade-end chart performance for "Take a Bow"
| Chart (1990–1999) | Position |
|---|---|
| Canada (Nielsen SoundScan) | 88 |
| US Billboard Hot 100 | 24 |

=== All-time charts ===
All-time chart performance for "Take a Bow"
| Chart (1958–2018) | Rank |
|---|---|
| US Billboard Hot 100 (Women) | 89 |

== Certification and sales ==
Certifications and sales for "Take a Bow"
| Region | Certification | Certified units/sales |
|---|---|---|
| Italy | — | 300,000 |
| United Kingdom | — | 102,739 |
| United States (RIAA) | Gold | 500,000 |

== See also ==
- List of number-one singles of 1995 (Canada)
- List of Billboard Hot 100 number ones of 1995
- List of Hot Adult Contemporary number ones of 1995
- List of Billboard Mainstream Top 40 number-one songs of the 1990s
- List of Cash Box Top 100 number-one singles of 1995

== Bibliography ==
- Beebe, Roger; Middleton, Jason (2007). Medium Cool: Music Videos from Soundies to Cellphones. Duke University Press. ISBN 978-0-8223-4162-8.
- Bronson, Fred (2003). The Billboard Book of Number 1 Hits. Billboard books. ISBN 0-8230-7677-6.
- Feldman, Christopher (2000). Billboard Book of Number 2 Singles. Watson-Guptill. ISBN 0-8230-7695-4.
- Fouz-Hernández, Santiago; Jerman-Ivens, Freya (2004). Madonna's Drowned Worlds. Ashgate Publishing. ISBN 0-7546-3372-1.
- Guilbert, Georges-Claude (2002). Madonna as Postmodern Myth. McFarland. ISBN 0-7864-1408-1.
- Rettenmund, Matthew (2016). Encyclopedia Madonnica 20. Boyculture Publications. ISBN 978-0-692-51557-0.
- Roberts, David (2004). British Hit Singles & Albums (17th ed.). Guinness World Records. ISBN 0-85112-199-3.
- Rooksby, Rikky (2004). The Complete Guide to the Music of Madonna. Omnibus Press. ISBN 0-7119-9883-3.
- Sullivan, Steve (2013). Encyclopedia of Great Popular Song Recordings, Volume 2. Scarecrow Press. ISBN 978-0-8108-8296-6.
- Taraborrelli, J. Randy (2008). Madonna: An Intimate Biography. Simon & Schuster. ISBN 978-1-4165-8346-2.
- Timmerman, Dirk (2007). Madonna Live! Secret Re-inventions and Confessions on Tour. Maklu Publishers. ISBN 9789085950028.
- Vernallis, Carol (2004). Experiencing Music Video: Aesthetics and Cultural Context. Columbia University Press. ISBN 978-0-231-50845-2.
- Wade, Chris (2016). The Music of Madonna. Wisdom Twins Books. ISBN 978-1-326-53580-3.
