= Lost Together (The Rembrandts album) =

Studio album by The Rembrandts
- Released: October 2, 2001
- Genre: Pop rock, soft rock, alternative rock
- Label: J-Bird
- Producer: John Fields, The Rembrandts

The Rembrandts chronology
Spin This (1998)	Lost Together (2001)	Choice Picks (2005)

Professional ratings
Review scores
Source	Rating
AllMusic	3/5 stars
The Encyclopedia of Popular Music	3/5 stars

Lost Together is an album by the American pop rock duo The Rembrandts. It was released on J-Bird Records on October 2, 2001.

== Critical reception ==
AllMusic called the album "a respectable, likable, even modest pop/rock record, better than those of many indies with cooler reputations." The Corvallis Gazette-Times called it "a raucous reunion worthy of the Rembrandts name."

== Track listing ==
1. "Lost Together"
2. "St. Paul"
3. "Too Late"
4. "You Are the One"
5. "One Of Us"
6. "The Way She Smiles"
7. "Another Day Down"
8. "Buddy Jo"
9. "Long Way to Go"
10. "Big Plans"
11. "Some Other World"
12. "Happiness"
