= The Rembrandts =

American alternative rock band

- Origin: Los Angeles, California, U.S.
- Genres: Alternative rock; pop rock; power pop; jangle pop
- Years active: 1989–1997; 2000–present
- Labels: Atco; Atlantic; East West; J-Bird; Fuel 2000; Blue Élan
- Members: Phil Solem; Danny Wilde
- Website: www.therembrandts.net

The Rembrandts are an American alternative rock duo, formed in Los Angeles by Danny Wilde and Phil Solem in 1989. They had previously worked together as members of Great Buildings in 1981. The Rembrandts are best known for the song "I'll Be There for You", which was used as the main theme song for the NBC sitcom Friends.

== History ==
Wilde was a member of 1970s cult recording act the Quick, and had released several mildly successful solo albums in the 1980s. Wilde and Solem had been in the power-pop quartet Great Buildings, a band that released one album for CBS in 1981 before dissolving.

After establishing themselves as the Rembrandts in 1989, Solem and Wilde recorded a self-titled album largely in Wilde's home studio. From this album, the group had their first success during 1990 with "Just the Way It Is, Baby", which scored at number 14 on the Billboard Hot 100. The self-titled album scored number 88 on the Billboard 200.

The next album, Untitled, of 1992, featured the minor successes "Johnny, Have You Seen Her?" and "Chase the Clouds Away". Another track from the album, "Rollin' Down the Hill", was used in the film Dumb and Dumber.

"I'll Be There for You", the theme for the sitcom Friends, reached No. 1 on the Hot 100 Airplay chart for several weeks before being released as a single and peaking at No. 17 on the U.S. Billboard chart. The single has been released in other countries, including the UK, where it reached No. 3 in 1995 and No. 5 in 1997. The success of Friends has caused a greater awareness of the band, and led to greater sales of their recorded albums. The song was also featured on the Friends Soundtrack album. An earlier, previously unreleased version of "I'll Be There for You" with a different lyric was included on their Unreleased Stuff album.

In 1997, the duo split, with Solem returning to Minneapolis to concentrate on his band Thrush. In 1998, Wilde released the album Spin This, credited to "Danny Wilde + The Rembrandts". In 2000, Solem and Wilde reunited, and released the album Lost Together as the Rembrandts the following year.

In 2005, the band released two versions of an album of re-recorded favorites, Choice Picks: one released through Awarestore.com which features the new track "Chasin' Down a Rainbow", the other on the Fuel 2000 label with the new track "Don't Give Me Up".

In 2006, Rhino Records released the collection Greatest Hits, a 20-song career-to-date retrospective including material from the lone Great Buildings album Apart from the Crowd.

In 2016 the pair reunited and announced they would release a new album. Via Satellite was released in 2019.

== Mainstream success ==
Despite achieving success with "I'll Be There for You", the duo has been dismissive of the song. Phil Solem in 1995, said "We don't want to hang our hats on the theme from a TV show...[w]e've been working too long at our craft for that." The same year, the duo tried to apologize for the song on MTV News' "The Year in Rock."

== Legacy ==
In 2014, Rolling Stone ranked them the 20th-best two-hit wonder of all time. Insider placed them on their list of the "Best One-Hit Wonders of All Time".

== Members ==
- Danny Wilde (born June 3, 1956, Houlton, Maine, U.S.) – vocals, bass, guitar, harmonica, mandolin, keyboards, percussion
- Phil Solem (born July 1, 1956, Duluth, Minnesota, U.S.) – vocals, guitars, keyboards, banjo, bass

== Discography ==
=== Studio albums ===
Title	Details	Peak chart positions						Certifications
Title	Details	US	AUS	AUT	NZ	SWE	UK	Certifications
The Rembrandts	Released: September 4, 1990; Label: Atco	88	93	23	—	43	—	
Untitled	Released: September 15, 1992; Label: Atco	—	158	—	—	—	—	
LP	Released: May 23, 1995; Label: EastWest America	23	133	—	25	—	14	RIAA: Platinum
Spin This (with Danny Wilde)	Released: April 28, 1998; Label: EastWest America	—	—	—	—	—	—	
Lost Together	Released: October 2, 2001; Label: J-Bird	—	—	—	—	—	—	
Via Satellite	Released: 2019; Label: Blue Élan	—	—	—	—	—	—	

=== Compilation albums ===
List of albums, with selected details
Title	Details
Choice Picks	Released: 2005; Label: True North, Fuel 2000
Greatest Hits	Released: 2006; Label: Rhino Records

=== Singles ===
Title	Year	Peak chart positions										Certifications	Album
Title	Year	US	US Main. Rock	US Main. Pop	AUS	CAN	FRA	GER	NLD	SWE	UK	Certifications	Album
"Just the Way It Is, Baby"	1990	14	13	—	26	12	9	6	53	23	77		The Rembrandts
"Someone"	1991	78	—	—	104	82	—	45	57	—	—		The Rembrandts
"Burning Timber"	1991	—	36	—	—	—	—	—	—	—	—		The Rembrandts
"Save Me"	1991	—	—	—	—	—	—	64	—	—	—		The Rembrandts
"Johnny Have You Seen Her"	1992	54	24	38	172	48	—	54	—	—	—		Untitled
"Maybe Tomorrow"	1993	—	—	—	—	—	—	—	—	—	—		Untitled
"Chase the Clouds Away"	1993	—	—	—	—	—	—	—	—	—	—		Untitled
"Waiting to Be Opened"	1993	—	—	—	—	—	—	—	—	—	—		Untitled
"I'll Be There for You"	1995	17	—	1	3	1	—	77	—	—	3	ARIA: Platinum; BPI: Platinum	LP
"This House Is Not a Home"	1995	17	—	31	150	82	—	—	—	—	58		LP
"Don't Hide Your Love"	1995	—	—	—	—	—	—	—	—	—	—		LP
"Drowning in Your Tears"	1996	—	—	—	—	—	—	—	—	—	—		LP
"I'll Be There for You" [European re-release]	1997	—	—	—	—	—	25	—	20	34	5		LP
"Too Late"	2001	—	—	—	—	—	—	—	—	—	—		Lost Together

== See also ==
- Pat Mastelotto
- Pete McRae
