= I'll Be There for You (The Rembrandts song) =

1995 single by the Rembrandts, theme song of the television sitcom "Friends"

Single by the Rembrandts

from the album L.P. and Friends (Music from the TV Series)
- B-side: Album snippets (US); "Fixin' to Blow" (UK)
- Released: May 23, 1995
- Genre: Power pop; alternative rock
- Length: 3:09
- Label: EastWest America; Elektra
- Composer: Michael Skloff
- Lyricists: David Crane; Marta Kauffman; Allee Willis; Danny Wilde; Phil Sōlem
- Producer: Gavin MacKillop

The Rembrandts singles chronology
| "Waiting to Be Opened" (1993) | "I'll Be There for You" (1995) | "This House Is Not a Home" (1995) |

Audio sample
- file; help

"I'll Be There for You" is a song by American pop rock duo the Rembrandts. The song was written by David Crane, Marta Kauffman and Allee Willis as the main theme song to the NBC sitcom Friends, which was broadcast from 1994 to 2004. American rock band R.E.M. was originally asked to allow their song "Shiny Happy People" to be used for the Friends theme, but they turned the opportunity down. "I'll Be There for You" was subsequently written and Warner Bros. Television selected the only available band on Warner Bros. Records to record it: the Rembrandts. In 1995, after a Nashville radio station brought the song to mainstream popularity, Rembrandts members Danny Wilde and Phil Sōlem expanded the theme song with two new verses and included this version on their third studio album, L.P. (1995).

The extended version of the song was serviced to US radio on May 23, 1995, and was issued in the United Kingdom on August 7, 1995, as the first single from L.P. Following the song's release, it reached the top 10 in Australia, New Zealand and Norway, as well as on the Irish Singles Chart and the UK Singles Chart in both 1995 and 1997. In Canada, the song reached number one for five weeks and was the most successful single of 1995, while in the United States, the song reached number 17 on the Billboard Hot 100 and topped the Billboard Hot 100 Airplay chart for eight weeks.

== Background and release ==
The title theme used in the pilot for Friends was "Shiny Happy People" by American rock band R.E.M. For later episodes, Warner Bros. Television wanted either that song, or a song by R.E.M. frontman Michael Stipe. When Stipe rejected the offer, the producers of the show instead wrote their own theme song and enlisted the Rembrandts, consisting of members Phil Sōlem and Danny Wilde, to record it. The music was composed by Marta Kauffman's husband, Michael Skloff. The Rembrandts did not want to record the song, but since they were the only available band on Warner Bros. Records, they relented to the company's demands. The original lyrics of "I'll Be There for You", a single verse as needed for the length of the series' opening credits, were co-written by Friends producers David Crane, and Kauffman along with songwriter Allee Willis. Skloff became inspired by hearing the Beatles song "Paperback Writer" on the radio while reading a show script and sought to capture a mid-1960s pop sound for the theme; though Michael Stipe speculates that the theme may have been written to emulate the sound of his band R.E.M. who were initially asked to supply the theme song. The handclaps at the end of the first line of the song were a last-minute addition, with Sōlem admitting that it was a wise decision and naming it the best part of the track.

The original theme, which is under one minute long, was later re-recorded as a three-minute pop song. After a radio announcer in Nashville, Tennessee, looped the original short version into a full-length track and broadcast it, the song became so popular that the Rembrandts had to re-record it, as well as helping to write the second verse and bridge. Sōlem said, "Our record label said we had to finish the song and record it. There was no way to get out of it." The three-minute version of "I'll Be There for You" was serviced to American contemporary hit radio on May 23, 1995. In the United Kingdom, a CD single and cassette single were issued on August 7, 1995. On May 12, 1997, the CD and cassette were re-issued in the UK to commemorate the video release of the first season of Friends.

== Composition ==
"I'll Be There for You" is an upbeat song about traveling, dead-end jobs, and friendship.

== Critical reception ==
Mark Sutherland from NME wrote, "Another record that makes you want to be American. This time it's one of the boho twentysomethings who populate US sitcom Friends, to which this is the theme. And, as such, it's the aural equivalent of the programme: all snazzy handclaps, ever-so-slightly alternative guitars, 'kooky' harmonies and lyrics that hint at existential angst but, fortunately, only the kind that can be sorted out in half an hour in front of a live studio audience. I'll be there for you, they swoon, When the rain starts to fall. What, in October?" Leesa Daniels from Smash Hits gave "I'll Be There for You" a score of four out of five, saying, "It's quirky in a Beatles/Monkees way and it demands to be danced to in a ridiculous fashion that could possibly involve exposing your underwear. Ace!" In 2009, the song was listed by Blender as one of the "50 Worst Songs Ever". Conversely, several magazines have listed the song as one of the best TV theme songs, including Paste, Complex, and Observer.

== Chart performance ==
"I'll Be There for You" topped the US Billboard Hot 100 Airplay chart for eight weeks and also peaked atop the Billboard Adult Contemporary and Top 40/Mainstream charts. At the peak of its popularity, the song was not available as a commercial single, therefore becoming the first song to top the Hot 100 Airplay chart without appearing on the Billboard Hot 100. On the Billboard Hot 100, when it was later released commercially as a double A-side with "This House Is Not a Home", it reached number 17. In Canada, the song peaked at number one for five consecutive weeks and was the most successful single of 1995. In the United Kingdom, it reached number three on the UK Singles Chart, and it peaked at the same position on the Irish Singles Chart the same year. In Scotland, it topped the country's singles chart. The song sold 322,000 copies in the UK during 1995.

While the song did not immediately make a significant commercial impact in Australia, reaching number 86 in October 1995, it re-entered the ARIA Singles Chart in August 1996 and peaked at number three on the week of October 13, spending a total of 20 weeks in the top 50. In 1997, when re-released in Europe, the song reached the top 10 in Ireland and the United Kingdom once more, placing two positions shy of its number-three peak in both countries. This re-release also saw the song reach the top 40 in Flanders, France, the Netherlands, Norway, and Sweden. As of May 2021, "I'll Be There for You" has sold 925,000 copies and has been streamed 20.7 million times in the UK since streaming figures were introduced in 2014. According to the Official Charts Company, the song is streamed an average of 96,000 times a week.

== Music video ==
The music video for "I'll Be There for You" features the band performing in a studio while the cast of Friends join in. Some scenes are shot in black-and-white. The Rembrandts members Phil Sōlem and Danny Wilde disclosed during a live interview on The Today Show on September 20, 2019, to celebrate the 25th anniversary of the song that the video was shot on the set of SNL (Studio 8H).

== Track listings ==
Several formats of the single feature snippets of six tracks from L.P. These tracks are "Don't Hide Your Love", "End of the Beginning", "Lovin' Me Insane", "Drowning in Your Tears", "This House Is Not a Home", and "What Will It Take".

=== 1995 release ===
- US 7-inch vinyl and European CD single
1. "I'll Be There for You (Theme from Friends)" – 3:09
2. Album snippets – 6:42
- UK 7-inch and cassette single
1. "I'll Be There for You (Theme from Friends)" – 3:09
2. Fixin' to Blow – 5:03

Note: The cassette single was reissued in 1997

=== 1997 release ===
- European and Australian CD single
1. "I'll Be There for You (Theme from Friends)" – 3:09
2. "Fixin' to Blow" – 5:03
3. "Just the Way It Is, Baby" – 4:06
4. Snippets medley – 6:46

== Personnel ==
Personnel are lifted from the European CD single liner notes.

Musicians

- Danny Wilde – lyrics, vocals, bass, acoustic guitar, percussion
- Phil Sōlem – lyrics, vocals, electric guitar
- Michael Skloff – music, Hammond organ
- Pat Mastelotto – drums

Production staff

- Marta Kauffman – lyrics, executive production
- David Crane – lyrics, executive production
- Gavin MacKillop – production
- Kevin S. Bright – executive production

== Charts ==
=== Weekly charts ===
1995–1999 weekly chart performance for "I'll Be There for You"
| Chart (1995–1999) | Peak position |
|---|---|
| Australia (ARIA) | 3 |
| Belgium (Ultratop 50 Flanders) | 10 |
| Canada Top Singles (RPM) | 1 |
| Canada Adult Contemporary (RPM) | 1 |
| Europe (Eurochart Hot 100) | 20 |
| Europe (European Hit Radio) | 13 |
| France (SNEP) | 25 |
| Germany (GfK) | 77 |
| Iceland (Íslenski Listinn Topp 40) | 10 |
| Ireland (IRMA) | 3 |
| Italy (Musica e dischi) | 30 |
| Netherlands (Dutch Top 40) | 15 |
| Netherlands (Single Top 100) | 20 |
| New Zealand (Recorded Music NZ) | 3 |
| Norway (VG-lista) | 5 |
| Scottish Singles Sales (Official Charts) | 1 |
| Sweden (Sverigetopplistan) | 34 |
| UK Singles (Official Charts) | 3 |
| UK Airplay (Music Week) | 2 |
| US Billboard Hot 100 with "This House Is Not a Home" | 17 |
| US Adult Contemporary (Billboard) | 1 |
| US Adult Top 40 (Billboard) | 7 |
| US Hot 100 Airplay (Billboard) | 1 |
| US Modern Rock Tracks (Billboard) | 23 |
| US Top 40/Mainstream (Billboard) | 1 |

2021–2026 weekly chart performance for "I'll Be There for You"
| Chart (2021–2026) | Peak position |
|---|---|
| Hungary (Single Top 40) | 14 |
| Poland (Polish Airplay Top 100) | 60 |

=== Year-end charts ===
1995 year-end chart performance for "I'll Be There for You"
| Chart (1995) | Position |
|---|---|
| Canada Top Singles (RPM) | 1 |
| Canada Adult Contemporary (RPM) | 24 |
| Iceland (Íslenski Listinn Topp 40) | 52 |
| New Zealand (RIANZ) | 42 |
| UK Singles (OCC) | 22 |
| UK Airplay (Music Week) | 7 |
| US Adult Contemporary (Billboard) | 5 |
| US Hot 100 Airplay (Billboard) | 7 |
| US Top 40/Mainstream (Billboard) | 5 |

1996 year-end chart performance for "I'll Be There for You"
| Chart (1996) | Position |
|---|---|
| Australia (ARIA) | 24 |
| UK Airplay (Music Week) | 33 |

1997 year-end chart performance for "I'll Be There for You"
| Chart (1997) | Position |
|---|---|
| Belgium (Ultratop 50 Flanders) | 56 |
| Netherlands (Dutch Top 40) | 133 |
| Norway (VG-lista) | 15 |
| UK Singles (OCC) | 50 |

== Certifications ==
Certifications and sales for "I'll Be There for You"
| Region | Certification | Certified units/sales |
|---|---|---|
| Australia (ARIA) | Platinum | 70,000^{^} |
| New Zealand (RMNZ) | Platinum | 30,000^{‡} |
| Norway (IFPI Norway) | Platinum | |
| United Kingdom (BPI) | Platinum | 925,000 |
^{^} Shipments figures based on certification alone.^{‡} Sales+streaming figures based on certification alone.

== Release history ==
Release dates and formats for "I'll Be There for You"
| Region | Date | Format(s) | Label(s) | Ref. |
|---|---|---|---|---|
| United States | May 23, 1995 | Contemporary hit radio | EastWest America; Elektra | |
| United Kingdom | August 7, 1995 | CD; cassette | EastWest America; Elektra | |
| Australia | August 28, 1995 | CD; cassette | EastWest America; Elektra | |

== Cover versions ==
- American pop rock band The Goo Goo Dolls recorded their own version of this song which contained slightly altered lyrics, and a more upbeat tempo, rockier sound, as well as a glockenspiel in the rhythm track.
- American punk rock band Pink Lincolns covered this song under the title "Friends" for a 1997 compilation album titled Show & Tell.
- Meghan Trainor covered the song on September 22, 2019, to celebrate the Friends 25th Anniversary at the Empire State Building light show.
- Charlie Puth and The War and Treaty covered the song in a stripped-down acoustic version along with Puth's own "See You Again" at the 75th Primetime Emmy Awards, as a tribute to Matthew Perry and others during the In Memoriam segment.
- In 2020, retro musical collective Postmodern Jukebox released a cover titled Evolution Of The "Friends" TV Theme Song, presenting the song in a series of period-inspired arrangements spanning the 20th century, with The Rembrandts themselves performing the "1990s version".

== In popular culture ==
For the 25th anniversary of the show, the Jonas Brothers appeared in a music video of the theme song featuring Priyanka Chopra Jonas, Sophie Turner and Danielle Jonas.

== See also ==
- List of Billboard Mainstream Top 40 number-one songs of the 1990s
- List of number-one adult contemporary singles of 1995 (U.S.)
- List of number-one singles of 1995 (Canada)
