= List of Billboard Hot 100 number ones of 1995 =

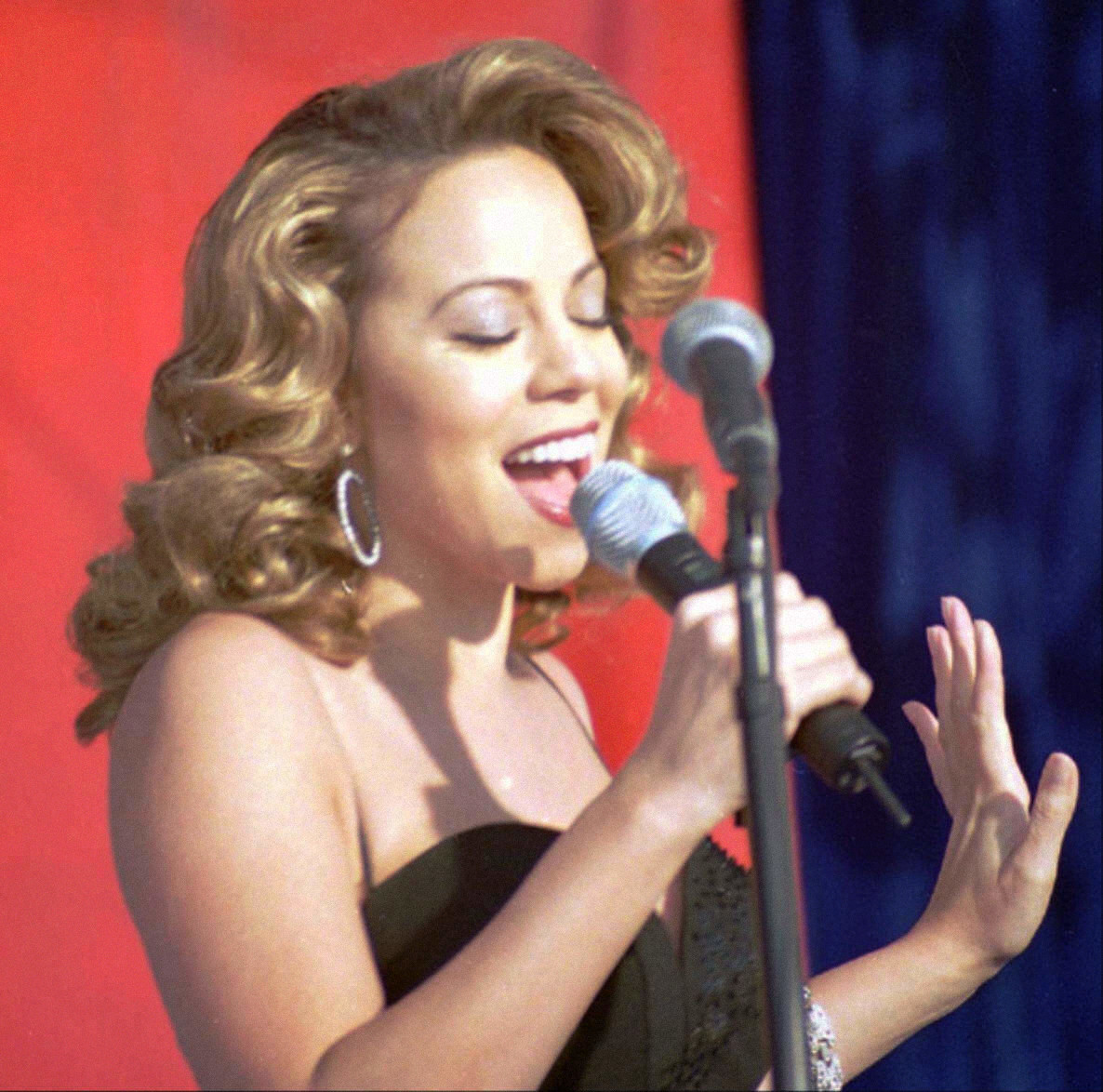
Pop singer Mariah Carey's hit single "One Sweet Day" held the No. 1 position on the Billboard Hot 100 for a record sixteen weeks.

The Billboard Hot 100 is a chart that ranks the best-performing singles of the United States. Published by Billboard magazine, the data are compiled by Nielsen SoundScan based collectively on each single's weekly physical sales and airplays.

Twelve singles topped the chart during the year. "On Bended Knee" by Boyz II Men began its peak at the top in 1994. The longest running number-one single of 1995 is "Fantasy" by Mariah Carey, which logged eight weeks atop the chart. The second longest-reigning number one single is a three-way tie between "Take a Bow" by Madonna, "This Is How We Do It" by Montell Jordan, and "Waterfalls" by TLC, with seven weeks each.

"One Sweet Day" by Mariah Carey and Boyz II Men held the record for the longest running song at number-one on the Billboard Hot 100 with 16 weeks. It also broke the 14-week record held by Whitney Houston's "I Will Always Love You" and Boyz II Men's "I'll Make Love to You". Five of those weeks were logged in 1995 and the other 11 weeks were logged in 1996. Michael Jackson's "You Are Not Alone" became the first single to debut at number-one on the Billboard Hot 100 and holds the Guinness World Record as the first song in the 37-year history of the Billboard Hot 100 to debut at number one. In addition, "Fantasy", "Exhale (Shoop Shoop)" by Whitney Houston, and "One Sweet Day" also debuted at number-one on the Billboard Hot 100.

That year, 5 acts earned their first number one song: TLC, Montell Jordan, Seal, Coolio, and L.V. Mariah Carey and TLC were the only acts to hit number one more than once, with two songs each.

== Chart history ==
Key
The yellow background indicates the #1 song on Billboard's 1995 Year-End Chart of Pop Singles.

No.	Issue date	Song	Artist(s)	Ref.
re	January 7	"On Bended Knee"	Boyz II Men	
re	January 14	"On Bended Knee"	Boyz II Men	
re	January 21	"On Bended Knee"	Boyz II Men	
794	January 28	"Creep"	TLC	
794	February 4	"Creep"	TLC	
794	February 11	"Creep"	TLC	
794	February 18	"Creep"	TLC	
795	February 25	"Take a Bow"	Madonna	
795	March 4	"Take a Bow"	Madonna	
795	March 11	"Take a Bow"	Madonna	
795	March 18	"Take a Bow"	Madonna	
795	March 25	"Take a Bow"	Madonna	
795	April 1	"Take a Bow"	Madonna	
795	April 8	"Take a Bow"	Madonna	
796	April 15	"This Is How We Do It"	Montell Jordan	
796	April 22	"This Is How We Do It"	Montell Jordan	
796	April 29	"This Is How We Do It"	Montell Jordan	
796	May 6	"This Is How We Do It"	Montell Jordan	
796	May 13	"This Is How We Do It"	Montell Jordan	
796	May 20	"This Is How We Do It"	Montell Jordan	
796	May 27	"This Is How We Do It"	Montell Jordan	
797	June 3	"Have You Ever Really Loved a Woman?"	Bryan Adams	
797	June 10	"Have You Ever Really Loved a Woman?"	Bryan Adams	
797	June 17	"Have You Ever Really Loved a Woman?"	Bryan Adams	
797	June 24	"Have You Ever Really Loved a Woman?"	Bryan Adams	
797	July 1	"Have You Ever Really Loved a Woman?"	Bryan Adams	
798	July 8	"Waterfalls"	TLC	
798	July 15	"Waterfalls"	TLC	
798	July 22	"Waterfalls"	TLC	
798	July 29	"Waterfalls"	TLC	
798	August 5	"Waterfalls"	TLC	
798	August 12	"Waterfalls"	TLC	
798	August 19	"Waterfalls"	TLC	
799	August 26	"Kiss from a Rose"	Seal	
800	September 2	"You Are Not Alone"	Michael Jackson	
801	September 9	"Gangsta's Paradise"	Coolio featuring L.V.	
801	September 16	"Gangsta's Paradise"	Coolio featuring L.V.	
801	September 23	"Gangsta's Paradise"	Coolio featuring L.V.	
802	September 30	"Fantasy"	Mariah Carey	
802	October 7	"Fantasy"	Mariah Carey	
802	October 14	"Fantasy"	Mariah Carey	
802	October 21	"Fantasy"	Mariah Carey	
802	October 28	"Fantasy"	Mariah Carey	
802	November 4	"Fantasy"	Mariah Carey	
802	November 11	"Fantasy"	Mariah Carey	
802	November 18	"Fantasy"	Mariah Carey	
803	November 25	"Exhale (Shoop Shoop)"	Whitney Houston	
804	December 2	"One Sweet Day"	Mariah Carey and Boyz II Men	
804	December 9	"One Sweet Day"	Mariah Carey and Boyz II Men	
804	December 16	"One Sweet Day"	Mariah Carey and Boyz II Men	
804	December 23	"One Sweet Day"	Mariah Carey and Boyz II Men	
804	December 30	"One Sweet Day"	Mariah Carey and Boyz II Men	

== Number-one artists ==
List of number-one artists by total weeks at number one
Position	Artist	Weeks at No. 1
1	Mariah Carey	13
2	TLC	11
3	Boyz II Men	8
4	Madonna	7
4	Montell Jordan	7
6	Bryan Adams	5
7	Coolio	3
7	L.V.	3
9	Seal	1
9	Michael Jackson	1
9	Whitney Houston	1

== See also ==
- 1995 in music
- List of Billboard number-one singles
- List of Billboard Hot 100 number-one singles of the 1990s

== Additional sources ==
- Fred Bronson's Billboard Book of Number 1 Hits, 5th Edition (ISBN 0-8230-7677-6)
- Joel Whitburn's Top Pop Singles 1955-2008, 12 Edition (ISBN 0-89820-180-2)
- Joel Whitburn Presents the Billboard Hot 100 Charts: The Nineties (ISBN 0-89820-137-3)
- Additional information obtained can be verified within Billboard's online archive services and print editions of the magazine.
