= Just the Way It Is, Baby =

1990 single by the Rembrandts

Single by the Rembrandts

from the album the Rembrandts
- B-side: "New King"; "LP Medley"
- Released: 1990
- Length: 4:06
- Label: Atco
- Songwriters: Phil Solem; Danny Wilde
- Producer: The Rembrandts

The Rembrandts singles chronology
"Just the Way It Is, Baby" (1990)	"Someone" (1991)

Music video
- "Just the Way It Is, Baby" on YouTube

"Just the Way It Is, Baby" is a song by American alternative rock duo the Rembrandts. Released in 1990 on the Atco Records label, it served as the debut single from their first album, The Rembrandts (1990). It first appeared on the US Billboard Album Rock Tracks chart in 1990, then became a top-10 hit one year later in France, where it remained on the country's chart for 16 weeks, and in Austria and Germany. It was a moderate hit in other European countries, Australia, and Canada. It spent nineteen weeks on the Billboard Hot 100, debuting at number 89 the week of 9 February 1991 and peaking at number 14 the week of 27 April 1991.

== Track listings ==
- 7-inch single
1. "Just the Way It Is, Baby" – 4:06
2. "New King" – 2:42
- CD single and 12-inch maxi
1. "Just the Way It Is, Baby" – 4:06
2. "LP Medley" – 7:50
- CD maxi and UK 12-inch
1. "Just the Way It Is, Baby" – 4:06
2. "LP Medley" – 7:50
3. "Just the Way It Is, Baby" (acoustic version) – 4:12

== Charts ==
=== Weekly charts ===
Chart (1990–1991)	Peak position
Australia (ARIA)	26
Austria (Ö3 Austria Top 40)	9
Canada Top Singles (RPM)	12
Canada Adult Contemporary (RPM)	7
Europe (Eurochart Hot 100)	31
Europe (European Hit Radio)	14
France (SNEP)	9
Germany (GfK)	6
Netherlands (Single Top 100)	53
Sweden (Sverigetopplistan)	23
UK Airplay (Music Week)	57
US Billboard Hot 100	14
US Adult Contemporary (Billboard)	12
US Album Rock Tracks (Billboard)	13
US Cash Box Top 100	14

=== Year-end charts ===
Chart (1991)	Position
Australia (ARIA)	95
Canada Adult Contemporary (RPM)	76
Germany (Media Control)	25

== Cover versions ==
This song was covered by the South African band Little Sister under a slightly altered title "That's Just the Way It Is" on their album More Than Meets the Eye.
