= Danny Wilde (musician) =

American musician (born 1956)

- Born: Daniel Thomas; June 3, 1956 (age 70)
- Origin: Houlton, Maine, U.S.
- Genres: Rock, power pop, pop rock, alternative rock, adult album alternative
- Instruments: Vocals, guitar, bass guitar, harmonica, whistling
- Member of: The Rembrandts
- Formerly of: Great Buildings

Danny Wilde (birth name Daniel Thomas; born June 3, 1956) is an American musician. He is a founding member of the alternative rock duo the Rembrandts, who are best known for the Friends theme song "I'll Be There for You".

Wilde was born in Houlton, Maine, but is known for breezy California power pop through his records released in the 1980s and 90s. In the 1980s he landed two minor rock radio hits with "Isn't It Enough" and "Time Runs Wild".

The single "Time Runs Wild" was featured on the soundtrack to the 1989 film Dream a Little Dream.

Wilde was the founding member of the power-pop band The Quick. Wilde then went on to form Great Buildings, which also featured his future Rembrandts bandmate Phil Solem, in 1981, releasing an album with this group. After the band's demise, Wilde pursued a solo career. His first solo release in 1986, The Boyfriend, garnered two pop singles: "Isn't It Enough" and "Body To Body". Wilde then released Any Man's Hunger in 1988. It featured tracks such as "Time Runs Wild" and "Wouldn't be the First Time", and reached number 176 on the U.S. album charts, his only solo album to chart in the United States. Wilde appeared on talk shows and a couple of his music videos gained airplay on MTV. His music videos can be seen on YouTube. Wilde also appeared on the Westwood One radio show and performed several tracks for the promotion of the Any Man's Hunger album. The 8-track live album is in circulation as a bootleg and can be downloaded online. Wilde followed it with the release of the self-titled album Danny Wilde in 1989. The album's only single "The Stuff That Dreams Are Made Of" gained radio play but Geffen did little to support the album and dropped Wilde two weeks after the album hit stores.

However, in the 1990s Wilde found major commercial success, forming The Rembrandts with Phil Solem. The duo's two biggest hits were "Just the Way It Is, Baby" (1990) and "I'll Be There for You" (1994), the theme from Friends.

In 2000, Wilde sang lead vocals on Canadian jazz-flamenco guitarist Jesse Cook's cover of the Crowded House hit "Fall at Your Feet", from Cook's album Free Fall.

Wilde wrote and performed the whistling theme song for the Chinese online television series Planet Homebuddies, which is based on Friends with a mainland China setting.

== Discography ==
=== Studio albums ===
- The Boyfriend (1986)
- Any Man's Hunger (1988)
- Danny Wilde (1989)
- Spin This (1998)

=== Extended plays ===
- Take Another Swing (2016)
