= Romero =

The name Romero is a nickname type of surname for an Ancient Roman or a modern day Italian. The name was originally derived from the Latin word Romaeus and the Greek word Romaios, which mean Roman.

1. A person on a religious journey or pilgrimage from Rome (possibly to Jerusalem)

== Other variations of the surname ==
- Roemer, a Middle High German and Swiss name meaning a pilgrim to the Holy Land
- Romer, an English and Dutch name meaning a religious pilgrim or religious warrior carrying a sacred object on his way to the Holy Land
- Rohmer, an Icelandic name meaning a guardian of a sacred place
- Romeo, an Italian name meaning a pilgrim to Rome
- Romeu, a Portuguese and Catalan name meaning someone on a pilgrimage to the Holy Land
- Romeos, a Modern Greek name meaning pilgrim to Jerusalem
- Romemu, a Hebraic word meaning one who exalts or glorifies a deity
- Robero, a surname derived from the given name Robert

== In the genealogical record in the Philippines ==
Romero is one of the surnames that were given by the Spaniards during the Spanish colonial era in the Philippines and the rest of other colonial nations in order to avoid confusion and technically, as a replacement of the indigenous surnames that were difficult to pronounce among Spaniards, altogether with the Catholic conversions as well. Majority of the ethnic Filipinos did not inherit their Spanish surnames, but obtained them for colonial purposes.

== Surname ==
A list of people with the surname Romero:

=== Academics ===
- Aldemaro Romero Jr. (born 1951), Venezuelan-American biologist
- E. Antonio Romero (1925–2005), Guatemalan philosopher, historian and writer
- Francisco Romero (1891–1962), Argentine philosopher
- Xavier Romero Frías (born 1954), Spanish anthropologist

=== Artists and designers ===
- Covadonga Romero Rodríguez (1917–2018), Spanish artist
- Brenda Romero (born 1966), American computer game designer and developer
- Enrique Badía Romero (1930–2024), Spanish comics artist known as Romero
- Frank Romero (born 1941), American painter, part of the Chicano art movement.
- John Romero (born 1967), American computer game programmer and designer

=== Clergy ===
- Orlando Romero Cabrera (born 1933), Uruguayan Roman Catholic bishop
- St. Óscar Romero (1917–1980), Salvadorian Roman Catholic archbishop

=== Politics and activists ===
- Alfredo Romero (born 1969), Venezuelan lawyer and human rights activist
- Anthony D. Romero (born 1965), American lawyer, executive director of the American Civil Liberties Union
- Bettina Romero (born 1978), Argentine politician
- Camilo Romero (born 1976), Colombian politician
- Carlos Romero Barceló (1932–2021), Puerto Rican politician
- Carmen Romero Rubio (1864–1944), former Mexican First Lady
- Christy Goldsmith Romero, American lawyer, Special Inspector General of the Troubled Asset Relief Program
- Edward L. Romero (born 1934), American entrepreneur and diplomat
- Flerida Ruth Pineda-Romero (1929–2017), former Associate Justice of the Supreme Court of the Philippines
- Gloria Romero (born 1955), American politician
- Gloria Romero León (born 1964), Mexican politician
- Ignacio Romero Osborne (1903–1985), Spanish Carlist activist
- Ignacio Romero Raizábal (1901–1975), Spanish writer and Carlist activist
- Jorge Romero Romero (1964–2021), Mexican politician
- Juan Carlos Romero (born 1950), Argentine politician, son of Roberto Romero, senator of the Salta Province
- Julia Romero Gusse, American politician
- Kate de Romero, former Puerto Rican First Lady
- Melinda Romero Donnelly (born 1971), Puerto Rican politician
- Miguel Romero (born 1970), Puerto Rican politician
- Regina Romero (born 1974), American politician, mayor of Tucson, Arizona
- Richard M. Romero (born 1944), American politician
- Roberto Romero (1927–1992), Argentine businessman, founder of El Tribuno newspaper, governor of Salta Province
- Teresa Romero (born 1958), Mexican and American labor union leader
- Trinidad Romero (1835–1918), American politician and rancher

=== Cinema and television ===
- Carlos Romero (1927–2007), American actor
- Cesar Romero (1907–1994), American actor
- Chanda Romero (born 1954), Filipina actress
- Constantino Romero (1947–2013), Spanish actor, voice actor and presenter
- Custodia Romero (1905–1974), Spanish flamenco dancer and actress
- Eddie Romero (1924–2013), Filipino film director
- George A. Romero (1940–2017), American film director
- Gloria Romero (1933–2025), Filipina actress
- Hernán Romero (1942–2025), Peruvian actor
- Manuel Romero (director) (1891–1954), Argentine film director
- Pia Romero (former stage name of Pia Alonzo Wurtzbach; born 1989), Filipina actress, model and beauty queen
- Susana Romero (actress) (born 1958), Argentine actress

=== Music ===
- Aldemaro Romero (1928–2007), Venezuelan musician
- Chan Romero (1941–2024), American rock and roll singer
- Danny Romero (born 1995), Spanish singer born Daniel Ramírez Romero
- Dyango (born 1940), Spanish musician born José Gómez Romero
- Eladio Romero Santos (1937–2001), Dominican musician
- Jesús Adrián Romero (born 1965), Mexican Christian worship singer
- Nicky Romero (born 1989), Dutch electronic music producer and DJ
- Paul Romero (born 1965), United States computer game music composer
- Ronnie Romero (born 1981), Chilean heavy metal singer
- The Romeros, Spanish classical guitar quartet featuring:
  - Celedonio Romero (1913–1996), classical guitarist, poet and composer
  - Celin Romero (born 1936), classical guitarist (son of Celedonio)
  - Pepe Romero (born 1944), classical guitarist (son of Celedonio)
  - Angel Romero (born 1946), classical guitarist and conductor (son of Celedonio)

=== Sports ===
- Romero (bullfighter family), a dynasty of 18th and 19th century bullfighters from Ronda, Andalusia, Spain, its most famous members being:
  - Francisco Romero (1700–1763), Spanish bullfighter
  - Juan Romero, Spanish bullfighter
  - José Romero, Spanish bullfighter
  - Pedro Romero (1754–1839), Spanish bullfighter
- Alfredo Romero (athlete) (born 1972), Puerto Rican track and field athlete
- Andrés Romero (born 1981), Argentine golfer
- Andrés Romero (born 1967), Chilean footballer
- Andrés Romero (born 1989), Argentine footballer
- Ángel Romero (1932–2007), Mexican cyclist
- Ángel Romero (born 1992), Paraguayan footballer
- Antonio Romero (born 1968), Mexican sprint canoeist
- Arturo Colón Romero (born 1928), Puerto Rican chess master
- Austin Romero (born 1981), American ring announcer known as Mike Rome
- Braian Romero (born 1991), Argentine footballer
- Camila Romero (born 1998), Ecuadorian tennis player
- Camilo Romero (born 1970), Mexican footballer
- Carmen Romero (born 1950), Cuban discus thrower
- César Romero (footballer, born 1980), Brazilian footballer
- Cibeles Romero (born 1978), Spanish field hockey player
- Cristian Romero (born 1998), Argentine footballer
- Curro Romero (born 1933), Spanish bullfighter (not a member the Romero dynasty)
- Diego Romero (footballer, born 1975), Argentine midfielder
- Diego Romero (footballer, born 1988), Argentine forward
- Eduardo Romero (1954–2022), Argentine golfer
- Enny Romero (born 1991), Dominican baseball player
- Enrique Romero (born 1971), Spanish footballer
- Fernando Romero (born 2000), Paraguayan footballer
- Gonzalo Romero (born 1975), Guatemalan footballer
- J. C. Romero (born 1976), Puerto Rican baseball player
- Jhon Romero (born 1995), Colombian baseball player
- John Romero (born 1976), American football player
- JoJo Romero (born 1996), American baseball player
- Jordan Romero (born 1996), American mountain climber, the youngest person to climb the Seven Summits – the highest peaks on every continent
- José Romero (1878–????), Cuban baseball player
- Jose Romero (born 1971), Chilean Australian rules footballer
- José 'Joselito' Romero Jiménez (born 1985), Spanish footballer
- José Romero Santos (born 1936), Cuban rower
- José Antonio Romero Morilla (born 1980), Spanish football manager
- José Luis Romero (born 1945), Spanish footballer and coach
- José Santos Romero (born 1951), Argentine footballer and manager
- Julio César Romero (born 1960), Paraguayan footballer
- Leo Romero (born 1986), Mexican American professional skateboarder
- Leticia Romero (born 1995), Spanish basketball player
- Liborio Romero (born 1979), Mexican boxer
- Lucas Romero (born 1994), Argentine footballer
- Lucas Romero (Paraguayan footballer) (born 2002), Paraguayan footballer
- Luciano Romero (born 1993), Argentine footballer
- Luka Romero (born 2004), Argentine footballer
- Mario Antonio Romero (born 1980), Argentine footballer
- Mary Romero (born 1985), Spanish professional boxer
- Mauricio Martín Romero (born 1983), Argentine footballer
- Maximiliano Romero (born 1999), Argentine footballer
- Miguel Ángel Sebastián Romero (born 1979), Argentine footballer who plays for Independiente Rivadavia
- Miguel Colón Romero, Puerto Rican chess master
- Mikey Romero (born 2004), American baseball player
- Óscar Romero (born 1992), Paraguayan footballer
- Oscar Romero (born 1996), American soccer player
- Pablo Romero (born c. 1960), Cuban amateur boxer
- Ramón Romero (1959–1988), Dominican baseball player
- Randy Romero (1957–2019), American jockey
- Rafael Romero (1938–2021), Venezuelan track and field athlete
- Rebecca Romero (born 1980), British track cyclist and rower
- Ricardo Romero (1899–????), Chilean Olympic fencer
- Ricardo Romero (born 1978), American mixed martial arts fighter
- Ricky Romero (1931–2006), American professional wrestler
- Ricky Romero (born 1984), American baseball pitcher
- Rito Romero (1927–2001), Mexican professional wrestler
- Rocky Romero (born 1982), ring name of Cuban-born American professional wrestler John Rivera
- Rolland Romero (1914–1975), American triple jumper
- Sebastián Ariel Romero (born 1978), Argentine footballer
- Sergio Romero (born 1987), Argentine football goalkeeper
- Seth Romero (born 1996), American baseball player
- Sierra Romero (born 1994), American softball player
- Silvio Romero (footballer) (born 1988), Argentine footballer
- Sydney Romero (born 1997), American softball player
- Tommy Romero (born 1997), American baseball player
- Vicente Romero (born 1987), Spanish footballer
- Yamil Romero (born 1995), Argentine footballer
- Yoel Romero (born 1977), Cuban mixed martial artist
- Zaid Romero (born 1999), Argentine footballer

== Fictional characters ==
- Romero, a fictional character in the anime series Beyblade
- Romero Malcolm, a fictional character in the book series "All For The Game".
- Brody Romero, a fictional character in the television series Power Rangers Ninja Steel
- Jane Romero, a fictional character in the video game "Dead By Daylight".
- Sheriff Alex Romero, a fictional character in the television series Bates Motel

== See also ==
- Christian Initiative Romero, a non-profit organisation in Germany working in support of industrial law and human rights in Central America, named after Óscar Romero
