= Ordóñez =

Ordóñez or Ordoñez is a Spanish surname, derived from the given name Ordoño. Notable people with the surname include:

- Ordóñez (bullfighter family)
  - Cayetano Ordóñez (1904–1961), patriarch of the family
  - Antonio Ordóñez (1932–1998)
  - Francisco Rivera Ordóñez (born 1974)
  - Cayetano Rivera Ordóñez (born 1977)
- Andersson Ordóñez (born 1994), Ecuadorian footballer
- Angel Gil-Ordoñez (born 1957), Spanish-American conductor
- Arquímides Ordóñez (born 2003), Guatemalan-American footballer
- Arturo Ordóñez (born 1997), Spanish footballer
- Bartolomé Ordóñez (1480–1520), Spanish Renaissance sculptor
- Bernarda Ordóñez Moscoso, Ecuadorian politician
- Bryan Ordóñez (born 1990), Guatemalan footballer
- Christian Ordóñez (born 2004), Argentine footballer
- Deinner Ordóñez (born 2009), Ecuadorian footballer
- Diana Ordóñez (born 2001), Mexican-American footballer
- Diego Ordóñez (1903–1990), Spanish sprinter
- Ebelio Ordóñez (born 1973), Ecuadorian footballer
- Eduardo Ordóñez (1908–1969), Puerto Rican footballer, coach and opera singer
- Efren Ordoñez (1927–2011), Mexican artist
- Francisco Fernández Ordóñez (1930–1992), Spanish politician who was minister in two different governments, brother of Miguel Ángel Fernández Ordóñez
- Florian Ordoñez, known by stage name Bigflo, part of the French duo Bigflo & Oli
- García Ordóñez (died 1108), Spanish medieval nobleman
- Gregorio Ordóñez (1958–1995), Spanish politician assassinated by ETA
- Hilda Ordóñez (born 1973), Bolivian football coach
- Isaac Ordonez (born 2009), American actor
- Isidro Ordóñez, Franciscan friar in New Mexico in the 1610s
- Jaime Ordóñez (born 1971), Spanish actor
- Joel Ordóñez (born 2004), Ecuadorian footballer
- Johana Ordóñez (born 1987), Ecuadorian racewalker
- José Anacleto Ordóñez (1778–1839), Supreme Chief of Nicaragua 1824-1825
- José Batlle y Ordóñez (1856–1929), former president of Uruguay
- Josefa Ordóñez (1728-fl. 1792), Mexican actress and courtesan
- Juan Francisco Ordóñez (born 1961), Dominican musician
- Juvenal Ordoñez (1948–2009), Peruvian politician
- Karl von Ordóñez (1734–1786), Austrian composer
- Leonor Ordóñez (1837–1882), Peruvian guerrilla fighter
- Lucas Ordóñez (born 1985), Spanish racing driver
- Magglio Ordóñez (born 1974), Venezuelan Major League Baseball right fielder for the Detroit Tigers
- Miguel Ángel Fernández Ordóñez (born 1945), Spanish politician of the Socialist Worker's Party and former governor of the Bank of Spain, brother of Francisco Fernández Ordóñez
- Olivio Ordoñez, known by stage name Oli, part of the French duo Bigflo & Oli
- Rey Ordóñez (born 1971), Cuban baseball player
- Roberto Ordoñez (born 1985), Ecuadorian footballer
- Salvador Diaz Ordóñez (1845–1911), an officer in the Spanish Army who designed artillery pieces in the late 19th and early 20th centuries
- Sancho I Ordóñez (c.895–929), Asturian king of Galicia
- Sancho Ordóñez (count), 11th-century Leonese nobleman
- Saúl Ordóñez (born 1994), Spanish runner
- Sylvia Ordóñez (born 1956), Mexican painter

== See also ==
- Ordóñez, a settlement in the Unión Department of Argentina
