= Eugenia Martínez de Irujo, 12th Duchess of Montoro =

Spanish noblewoman and socialite

The Most Excellent Duchess of Montoro GE
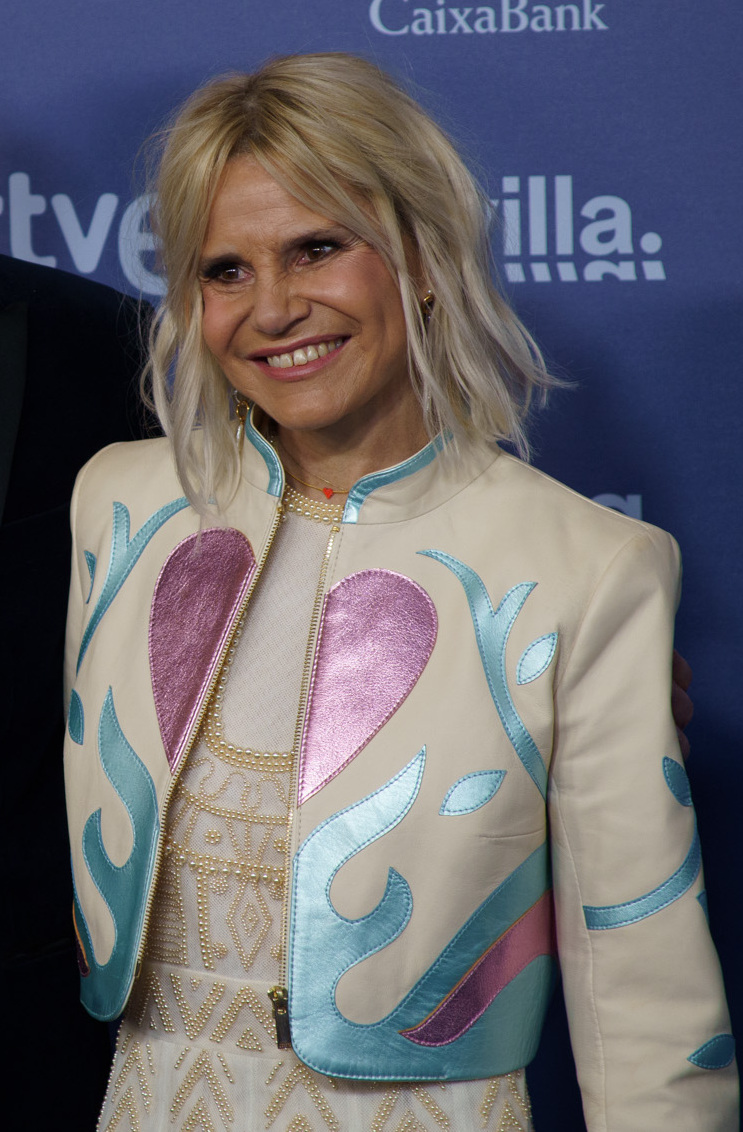
- Full name: María Eugenia Brianda Timotea Cecilia
- Born: 26 November 1968 (age 57); Madrid, Spain
- Noble family: House of Alba
- Spouses: Francisco Rivera Ordóñez (m. 1998; div. 2002) Narcís Rebollo Melció (m. 2017)
- Issue: Cayetana Rivera y Martínez de Irujo
- Father: Luis Martínez de Irujo y Artázcoz
- Mother: Cayetana Fitz-James Stuart, 18th Duchess of Alba

María Eugenia Martínez de Irujo y Fitz-James Stuart, 12th Duchess of Montoro, GE (born 26 November 1968) is a Spanish aristocrat and socialite. Born in Madrid, she is the youngest and only daughter of Luis Martínez de Irujo y Artázcoz and Cayetana Fitz-James Stuart, 18th Duchess of Alba. The Duchess works in public relations for Tous Designer House. Her official seat of residence is at Liria Palace in Madrid, but she also spends time at her property La Pizana in Gerena, in the province of Sevilla.

== Family ==
On October 23, 1998, the Duchess married Francisco Rivera Ordóñez at Seville Cathedral. He is a bullfighter and the eldest son of Francisco Rivera Pérez (known as "Paquirri"), also a matador, who was killed during a bullfight in 1984. His mother is Carmen Ordóñez, daughter of Antonio Ordóñez of the Ordóñez bullfighter family. The couple divorced in 2002, and had a daughter:

- Doña Cayetana Rivera y Martínez de Irujo (b. 16 October 1999).

On November 17, 2017, the Duchess married Narcís Rebollo Melció, president of Universal Music Spain and Portugal. The wedding ceremony took place at A Little White Wedding Chapel in Las Vegas, Nevada.

== Ancestry ==
Ancestors of Eugenia Martínez de Irujo, 12th Duchess of Montoro

8. Carlos Martínez de Irujo, 8th Duke of Sotomayor
4. Pedro Martínez de Irujo, 9th Duke of Sotomayor
9. María Caro y Széchényi
2. Luis Martínez de Irujo y Artázcoz
10. Francisco Javier de Artázcoz y Urdinola
5. Ana María de Artázcoz y Labayen, Lady-in-waiting to Queen Victoria Eugenie
11. María Luisa de Labayen y Aranzabe
1. Eugenia Martínez de Irujo, 12th Duchess of Montoro
12. Carlos María Fitz-James Stuart, 16th Duke of Alba
6. Jacobo Fitz-James Stuart, 17th Duke of Alba
13. María del Rosario Falcó, 20th Countess of Siruela
3. Cayetana Fitz-James Stuart, 18th Duchess of Alba
14. Alfonso de Silva, 16th Duke of Híjar
7. María del Rosario de Silva, 9th Marquise of San Vicente del Barco
15. María del Rosario Gurtubay y González de Castejón, Lady-in-waiting

Patrilineal descent

Eugenia's patriline is the line from which he is descended father to son. Patrilineal descent is the principle behind membership in Ducal Houses, as it can be traced back through the generations - which means that Eugenia's historically accurate House name is Irujo.

1. Juan Martínez de Irujo
2. Martín Martínez de Irujo y Tavar, b. 1613
3. Juan Martínez de Irujo y Mearín, b. 1648
4. Francisco Martínez de Irujo y Éspoz, b. 1678
5. Manuel Martínez de Irujo y de Erice, b. 1718
6. Carlos Martínez de Irujo, 1st Marquis of Casa Irujo, 1763–1824
7. Carlos Martínez de Irujo, 2nd Marquis of Casa Irujo, 1803–1855
8. Carlos Martínez de Irujo, 8th Duke of Sotomayor, 1846–1909
9. Pedro Martínez de Irujo, 9th Duke of Sotomayor, 1882–1957
10. Luis Martínez de Irujo y Artázcoz, 1919–1972
11. Eugenia Martínez de Irujo, 12th Duchess of Montoro, b. 1968

== Notes ==
Spanish nobility
Preceded by Cayetana Fitz-James Stuart	Duchess of Montoro; 24 November 1994 –	Incumbent
