= Ordóñez (bullfighter family) =

Ordóñez is the name of a Spanish bullfighting family that has flourished since 1917 in Ronda. It is one of two significant bullfighting families from the same city—the other one is the Romero family.

Notable members of the Ordóñez family are:

- Cayetano Ordóñez, known as "Niño de la Palma", father of Antonio Ordóñez.
- Antonio Ordóñez, grandfather of Francisco and Cayetano Rivera Ordóñez; brother-in-law of torero Luis Miguel Dominguin
- Francisco Rivera Ordóñez
- Cayetano Rivera Ordóñez
