= Francisco Romero =

Francisco Romero may refer to:

- Francisco García Romero (1559–1630s), Spanish military officer
- Francisco Romero (bishop) (died 1635), served as archbishop in Italy
- Francisco Romero (bullfighter) (1700–1763), Spanish matador
- Francisco Romero (philosopher) (1891–1962), Latin American philosopher
- Francisco Romero (surgeon), Spanish surgeon
- Francisco Romero (mayor), interim mayor of Ponce, Puerto Rico
- Francisco Romero (footballer), Argentine footballer
