= Gloria Romero (disambiguation) =

Gloria Romero (1933–2025) was a Filipino film and television actress. The name may also refer to:

- Gloria Romero (politician) (born 1955), U.S. politician, former member of the California State legislature
- Gloria Romero León (born 1964), Mexican politician, former member of the Chamber of Deputies
- Gloria Romero Roses, U.S. politician, member of the Florida State legislature

== See also ==
- Romero (disambiguation)
