= José Rivera Pérez =

Spanish bullfighter (1947–2021)

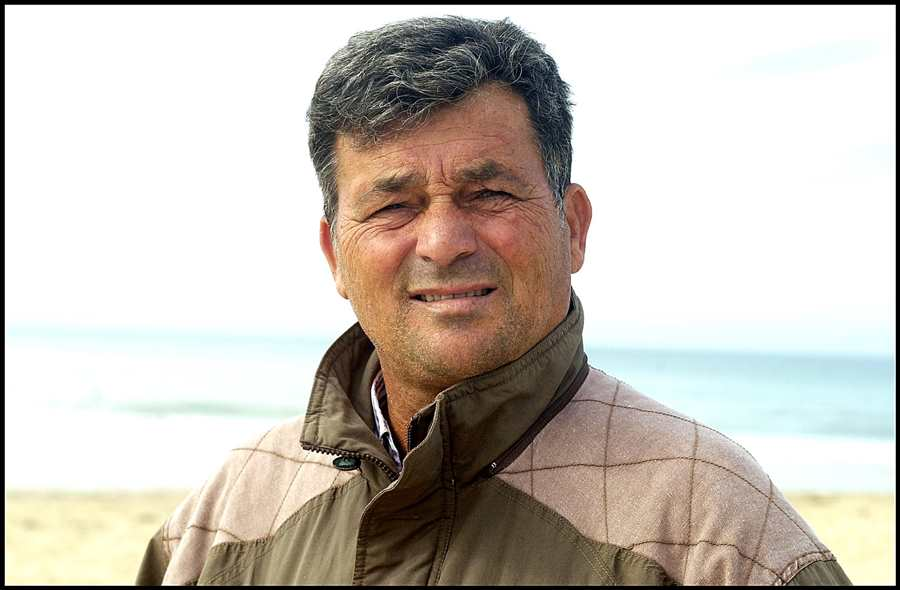

José Rivera "Riverita" Pérez (24 February 1947 ― 21 January 2021) was a Spanish bullfighter. He was the brother of Paquirri.

Riverita was born in Barbate, Province of Cádiz on 24 February 1947 from the marriage between novillero Antonio Rivera and Agustina Pérez. He debuted in his hometown in 1962. His first novillada was on 13 June 1965 in Madrid's bullring "Las Ventas". He took the alternative as a bullfighter, in El Puerto de Santa María on 1 September 1967, acting as Miguelín's godfather and Diego Puerta as witness. He retired from the arena in 1970, subsequently participating in some sporadic events.

He was brother of the iconic bullfighter Francisco Rivera "Paquirri" and uncle of DJ and socialite Kiko Rivera, son of Isabel Pantoja, and of the matadors Francisco and Cayetano Rivera Ordóñez and José Antonio Canales Rivera.

He died at his home on 21 January 2021, from cancer. He was buried on 23 January 2021 in Barbate.

== See also ==
- List of bullfighters
