= José Cubero Sánchez =

Spanish bullfighter (1964–1985)

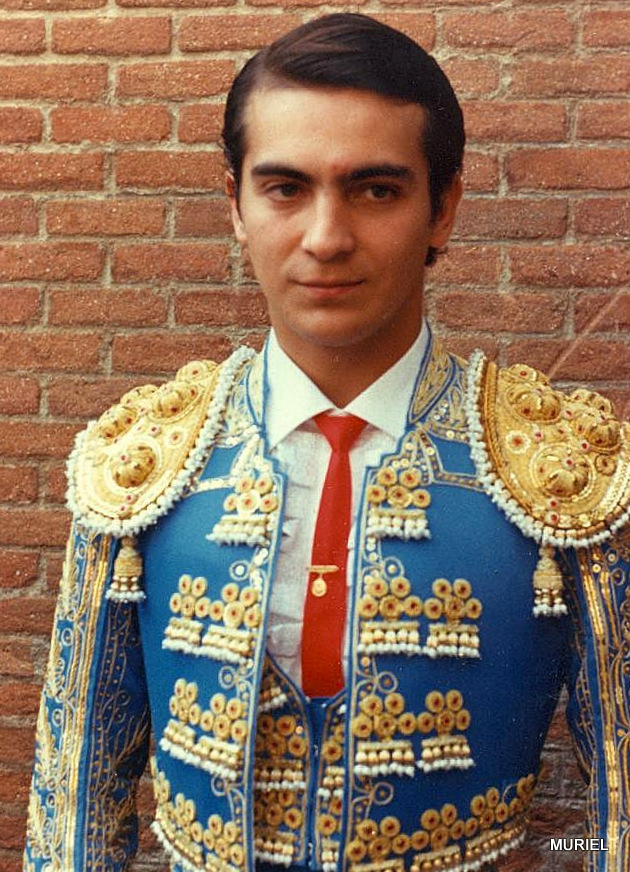
- Cubero in the 1980s

Personal information
- Nickname: El Yiyo
- Born: 16 April 1964 Bordeaux, France
- Died: 30 August 1985 (aged 21) Colmenar Viejo, Spain

Sport
- Sport: Bullfighting
- Rank: Matador

José Cubero Sánchez (Spanish: [xoˈse kuˈβeɾo ˈsantʃeθ]; 16 April 1964 – 30 August 1985), known as el Yiyo, was a Spanish bullfighter. He died at the age of 21 during a bullfight at the bullring in Colmenar Viejo when a bull named Burlero gored him in the heart.

== Life ==
Born in Bordeaux, France, to a Spanish emigrant family, Cubero was brought up in Madrid's Canillejas neighbourhood. He was a prominent alumnus of the Escuela Nacional de Tauromaquia ("National Bullfighting School") at the Venta del Batán, a complex in the Casa de Campo, Madrid's biggest public park. In 2016, it was given the name Escuela Taurina de la Comunidad de Madrid el Yiyo (ETCM Yiyo) in Cubero's honour. In February 1980, he made his début with picadores in San Sebastián de los Reyes, where he shared billing with Carlos Aragón and Antonio Amores. This same year, he led the ranking among novice bullfighters (novilleros) and thereby won the famous Zapato de Oro ("Golden Shoe") of Arnedo.

Cubero received the alternativa as a bullfighter on 30 June 1981 at the Plaza de Toros de Burgos, a bullring in Spain's north. Standing as "godfather" was Ángel Teruel, while José María Manzanares stood as witness; the fight was with the bull Comadrejo, raised by J. Buendía. Cubero's confirmation came on 27 May 1982, at the Feria de San Isidro ("Saint Isidore's Fair" — a yearly event at the Las Ventas bullring in Madrid). Standing as "godfather" this time was José María Manzanares, while Emilio Muñoz stood as witness; the fight was with the bull Bohemio, raised by Félix Cameno.

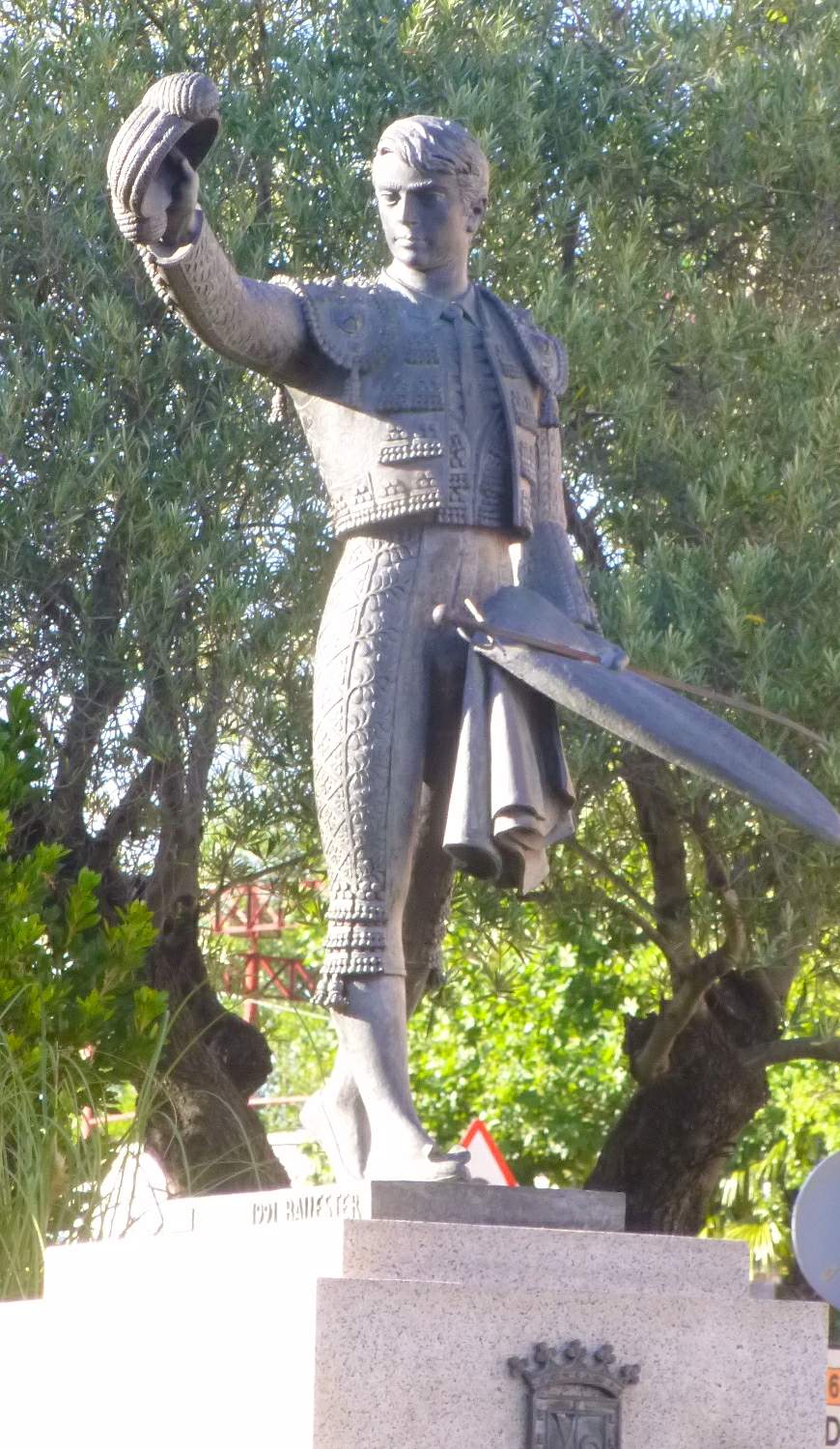
Monument in homage to el Yiyo in Colmenar Viejo

Cubero twice came out of the Great Gate at Las Ventas, on 1 and 9 June 1983, although he had also appeared at Spain's foremost bullring as a novillero in 1981.

On 26 September 1984, el Yiyo shared the billing in Pozoblanco with Francisco Rivera, known as "Paquirri", on the day when the latter was fatally wounded by a bull named Avispado, which he had assumed to be dead. In popular culture, this billing is held to be cursed (Cubero would himself be killed in the bullring less than a year later, in a very similar way).

=== Death ===
Having become a bullfighting benchmark and giving many fans hope for his prospects, and thus enjoying great popularity, on 30 August 1985, Cubero substituted for Curro Romero at the Colmenar Viejo bullring to perform alongside Antonio Chenel ("Antoñete") and José Luis Palomar, with bulls supplied by Marcos Núñez. That afternoon's sixth bull, named Burlero, gave Cubero a fight that ended with an estocada (the sword thrust meant to kill the bull) from which the bullfighter bounced away. He rolled over the ground and his subalternos came out to help, but the bull made straight for Cubero and wounded him, taking the young bullfighter by the armpit. The bull's horn gored Cubero right in the heart, splitting it in two; Cubero was killed almost instantly, but still managed to say to his friend in a weak voice "Pali, este toro me ha matado" ("Pali, this bull has killed me"), before dying. He was twenty-one years old. His funeral was held at Las Ventas in Madrid; on hand were authorities, fellow bullfighters and fans, and he was borne shoulder-high among the crowd to the Cementerio de la Almudena, where he was buried.

By way of homage, there is a sculpture of Cubero outside the Colmenar Viejo bullring, and another sculpture in his memory outside Las Ventas, Luis Sanguino's work. In 1985, the well-known journalist and writer Antonio D. Olano wrote the book Yiyo. Adiós, príncipe, adiós in Cubero's memory.

== See also ==
- Spanish Fighting Bull
- Spanish-style bullfighting
- Bullfighter
- Other Spanish bullfighters who were killed by bulls:
  - Víctor Barrio
  - Iván Fandiño
  - José Gómez Ortega
  - Manolete
  - Paquirri
  - Pepete
