= Diego Romero =

Diego Romero may refer to:

- Diego Romero (sailor) (born 1974), Italian sailor and Olympic medal winner
- Diego Romero (artist) (born 1964), American ceramic artist
- Diego Romero (footballer, born 1975), Argentine football defensive midfielder
- Diego Romero (footballer, born 1988), Argentine football forward
- Diego Romero (footballer, born 2001), Peruvian football goalkeeper
