= Antonio Romero =

Antonio Romero may refer to:

- Antonio Romero (canoeist) (born 1968), Mexican sprint canoer
- Antonio Romero (footballer, born 1997), Venezuelan footballer
- Antonio Romero (footballer, born 1995), Spanish footballer
- Antonio Romero (politician) (1955–2024), Spanish politician
- E. Antonio Romero (1925–2005), Guatemalan philosopher, historian and writer
