= José Canales =

José Canales may refer to:

- José Tomás Canales (1877–1976), American businessman, lawyer, and politician
- José Antonio Canales Rivera (born 1974), Spanish bullfighter
- José Canales (footballer) (born 1987), Mexican footballer
