= Romero (bullfighter family) =

Romero is family of bullfighters from Ronda, Spain, dating back to the 18th century. The only other family with a comparable history in bullfighting are the Ordóñez, whose founder, Cayetano Ordóñez, "El Niño de la Palmas", was also from Ronda.

Notable members of this family are:

- Francisco Romero
- Juan Romero (bullfighter)
- José Romero (bullfighter)
- Pedro Romero

== See also ==
- List of bullfighters
