= Manolo Navarro =

Spanish matador (1926–2020)

- Born: Manolo Navarro Salido; July 20, 1926; Albacete, Spain
- Died: April 2, 2020 (aged 93); Madrid, Spain
- Occupation: Matador
- Years active: 1942–1958
- Known for: Bullfighting

Manolo Navarro Salido (20 July 1926 – 2 April 2020) was a Spanish matador nicknamed "el decano de lost matadores" ("the dean of the bullfighters").

Navarro was born in Albacete on 20 July 1926. His bullfighting debut took place in 1942, at the age of 18, in Quintanar de la Orden. He was presented in Las Ventas on 24 June 1945 and took the alternative on 25 July 1947 at the San Jaime fair in Valencia. On 10 August 1947, he shared a poster with Manolete days before the latter's tragic death. On 4 October 1947, Navarro confirmed his doctorate in Madrid.

In addition to traditional bullfighting countries, he fought in places as diverse as Angola, Mozambique, the United States and the Philippines. After a career of eleven years as a bullfighter, he retired in Mexico in 1958.

During COVID-19 pandemic in Spain he died on 2 April 2020 at the age of 95 at the Puerta de Hierro Hospital in Madrid due to COVID-19.
