= Romero (disambiguation) =

Romero is a surname of Spanish origin.

Romero may also refer to:

== Places ==
- Romero Canyon, Arizona
- Romero Rock, Antarctica

== People ==
- Romero Lubambo (born 1955), Brazilian jazz guitarist
- Romero Osby (born 1990), American basketball player
- Romero Quimbo, Filipino politician and member of the Philippine House of Representatives
- Gabriella Romero, American politician
- Romero Mendonça Sobrinho (born 1975), Brazilian football striker

== Other uses ==
- Romero (film), a 1989 motion picture about assassinated Roman Catholic Bishop Óscar Romero
- ARM Romero, a patrol vessel of the Mexican Navy
- Trichostema lanatum, a shrub also called "romero" by Spanish explorers
