= Canales Rivera =

Spanish bullfighter

José Antonio Canales Rivera
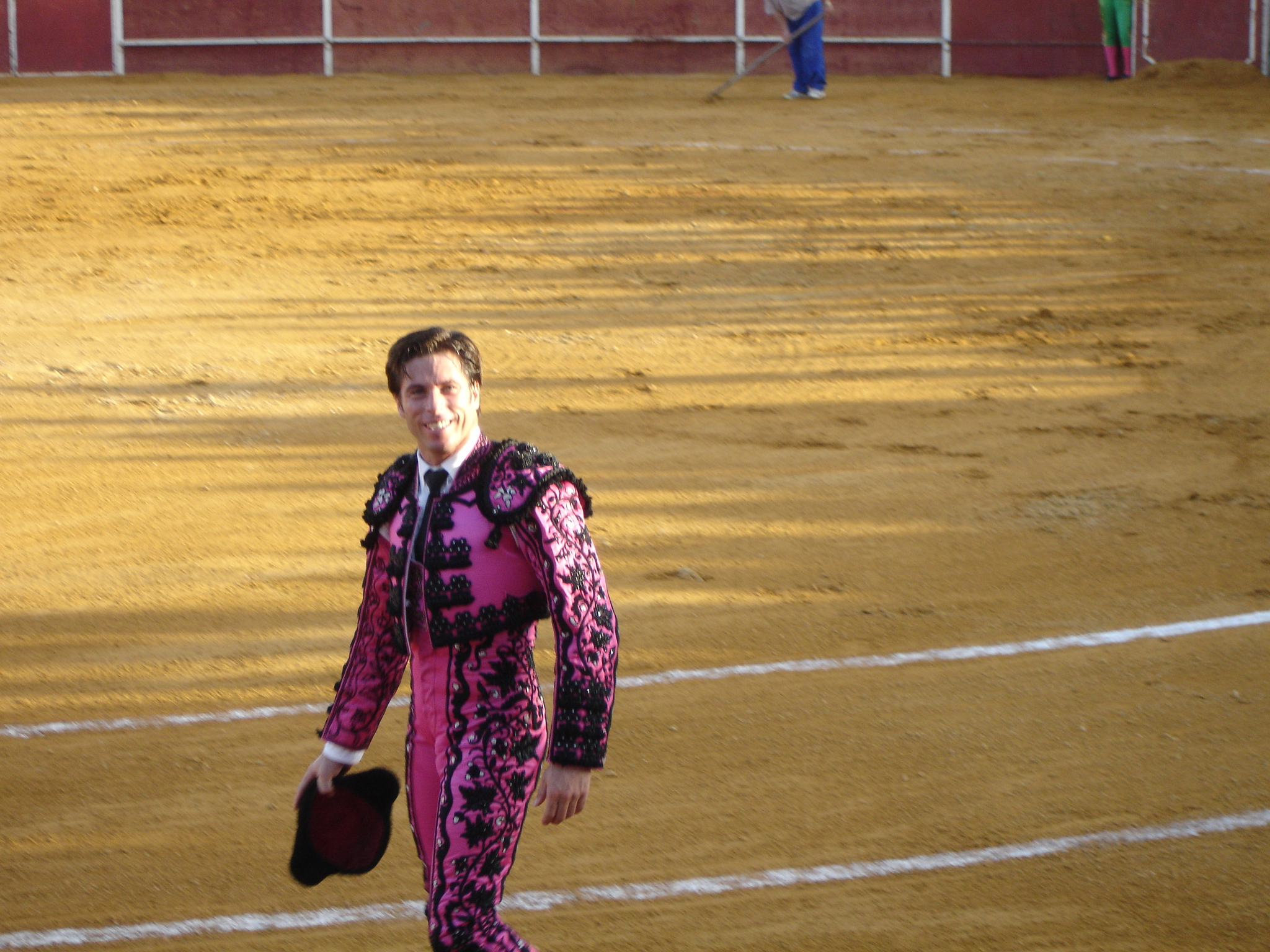
- Born: José Antonio Canales Rivera; March 28, 1974 (age 52); Barbate, Cádiz
- Occupation: Bullfighter
- Spouse: María del Carmen Fernandez Deudero (m. 2004; div. 2016)
- Children: 2
- Parent(s): José Antonio Canales; Teresa Rivera

José Antonio Canales Rivera (born 28 March 1974 in Barbate, Cádiz, Andalusia, Spain) is a well-known Spanish bullfighter.

He belongs to an important family of bullfighters. His mother, Teresa Rivera Pérez, was the sister of Francisco Rivera Pérez “Paquirri” and José Rivera Pérez, “Riverita”. His cousins are also well-known bullfighters, Francisco Rivera Ordóñez and Cayetano Rivera Ordóñez.

On 29 October 2004, he married María del Carmen Fernández Deudero in Cádiz and they have two children, José Antonio "Pancho" (30 May 2005-) and Carmela Guadalupe (1 May 2007-).
