= Paquirri =

Spanish bullfighter (1948–1984)

Francisco Rivera Pérez
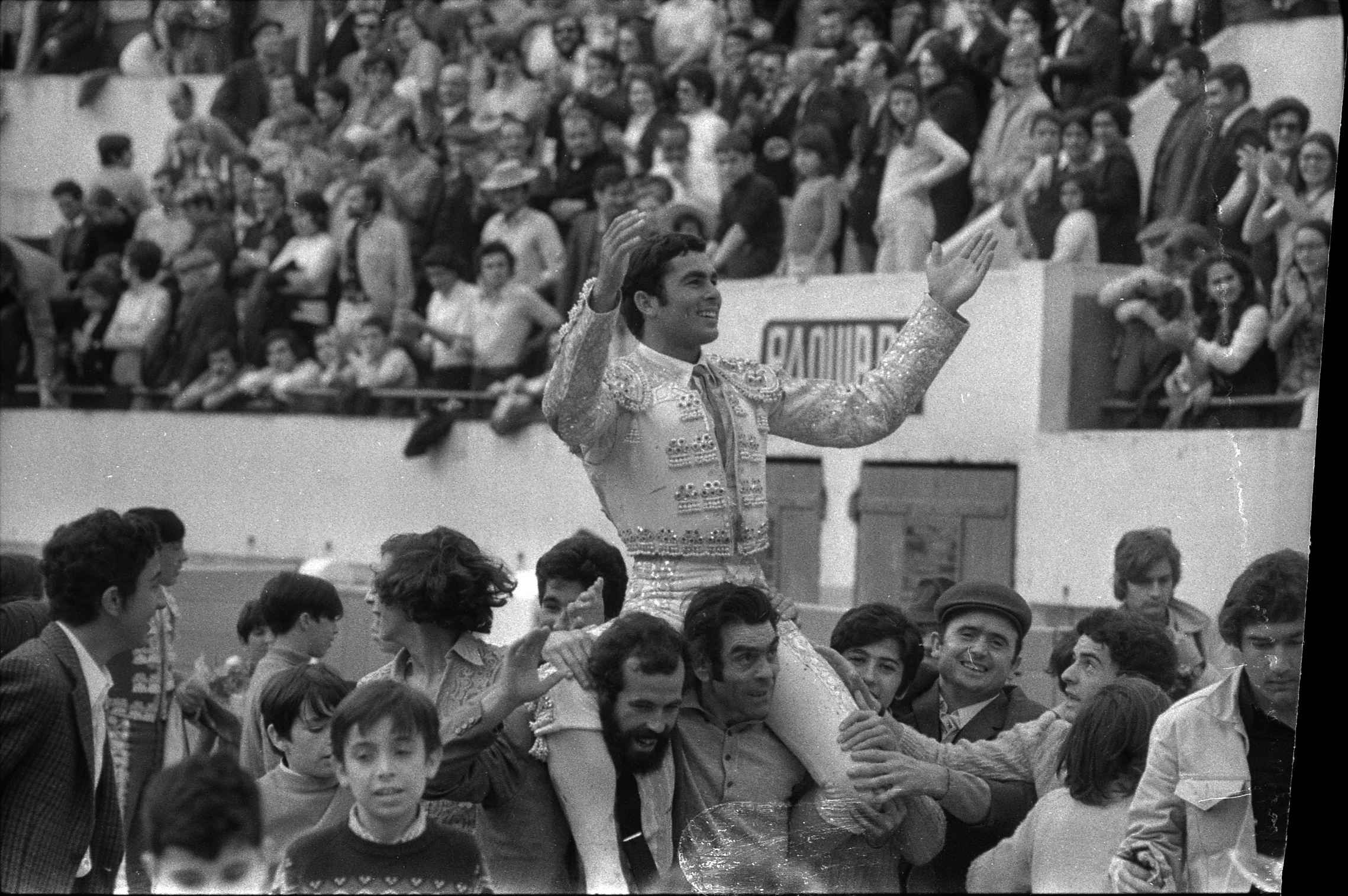
- Paquirri in 1971

Personal information
- Nickname: Paquirri
- Nationality: Spanish
- Born: 5 March 1948 Zahara de los Atunes, Cádiz, Andalusia, Spain
- Died: 26 September 1984 (aged 36) Córdoba, Córdoba, Andalusia, Spain
- Resting place: Cemetery of San Fernando; 37°24′59.2″N 5°58′56.5″W
- Monuments: Pozoblanco bullring Mausoleum sculpture El Puerto de Santa María bullring
- Home town: Barbate, Cádiz, Andalusia, Spain
- Occupation: Bullfighter
- Years active: 1962–1984
- Agent: José Camará; Manolo Camará (apoderados)
- Spouses: Carmen Ordóñez (m. 1973; div. 1979) Isabel Pantoja (m. 1983)
- Children: Francisco Rivera Ordóñez; Cayetano Rivera Ordóñez; Francisco José Rivera Pantoja
- Parents: Antonio Rivera Alvarado (father); Agustina Pérez Núñez (mother)
- Relatives: José Rivera Pérez (brother); José Antonio Canales Rivera (nephew)

Francisco Rivera Pérez (Spanish: [fɾanˈθisko riˈβeɾa ˈpeɾeθ]; 5 March 1948 – 26 September 1984), better known as Paquirri (Spanish: [paˈkiri]), was a Spanish bullfighter. He died after being gored by a bull named Avispado at the Pozoblanco bullring. During his career, he was six times borne shoulder-high out through the Great Gate at Las Ventas.

== Early life ==
Rivera was born to Agustina Pérez Núñez (Tarifa, 1922–1977) and the novillero (novice bullfighter who fights yearlings) Antonio Rivera Alvarado (born in Barbate, 17 February 1920; died in Cádiz, 10 November 2009), who was in charge of Barbate's municipal slaughterhouse, where Rivera and his brother José Rivera "Riverita", who also became a bullfighter, began their bullfighting. He grew up in Barbate within bullfighting milieux.

Those from whom he drew the most influence were Rafael Gómez Ortega "El Gallo" and Miguel Mateo Salcedo "Miguelín".

== Novillero ==
Rivera made his début as a novillero on 16 August 1962 in Barbate with livestock laid on by Núñez Polavieja.

On 28 June 1964, he made his début in a novillada with horses at the Cádiz bullring. He alternated with José González Copano and Rafael Jiménez Márquez, facing an encierro (set of bulls for a corrida, usually six) of beasts from the Marqués de Villamarta's herd.

In Seville on 1 May 1966, he cut three ears in one novillada, while sharing billing with Pepe Luis Segura and Manolo Sanlúcar. He was also borne shoulder-high out through the Prince's Gate at the Maestranza.

== Matador ==
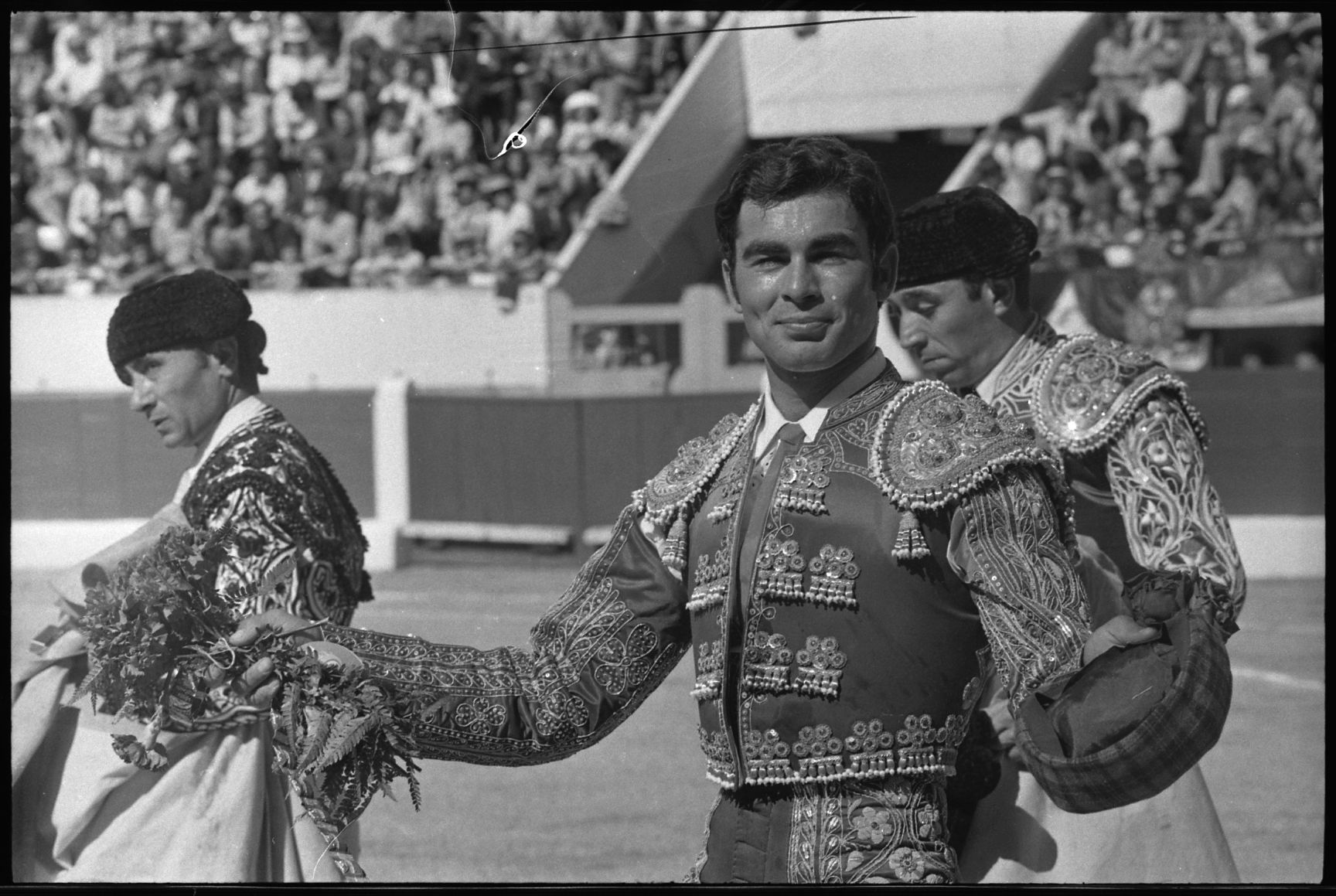
Paquirri at a corrida in Toulouse, 20 June 1971.

Rivera took his alternativa as matador de toros at the Plaza Monumental in Barcelona on 17 July 1966. Standing as "godfather" for this occasion was Antonio Bienvenida, while Andrés Vázquez bore witness. Bulls were supplied by the Juan Pedro Domecq ranch. The alternativa was not fulfilled, however, as the newly minted bullfighter was seriously gored in the right thigh during the bullfight.

The long awaited alternativa came on 11 August of the same year, after Rivera had healed somewhat, at the same bullring, but with Paco Camino yielding to Rivera the sword and muleta (as "godfather"), as Santiago Martín "El Viti" looked on (as witness). The bulls in the pens this time bore the Carlos Urquijo de Federico ranch's brand, and the bull that Rivera fought for his alternativa was Zambullido, weighing 513 kg. Rivera faced one other bull at this corrida, and although this beast presented the bullfighter with some difficulty by making it necessary for Rivera to take two passes before he managed the estocada (the sword thrust meant to kill the bull), he got applause from the crowd for his efforts that afternoon.

Only three days later, the very same bullring would be the scene of another of Rivera's appearances, this time with fellow matadors Antonio Borrero Morano "Chamaco" and Luis Segura, along with the rejoneador Ángel Peralta Pineda, with livestock furnished by María Lourdes Pérez Tabernero and Mercedes Pérez Tabernero.

Rivera had 19 further bullfighting engagements that season, but possibly the most important one for Rivera's career in the short term was the date at the Maestranza in Seville on 1 October 1966, at which he alternated with Jaime Ostos and "El Cordobés", for not only did he present himself as a matador at one of Spain's foremost bullrings, but the corrida also resulted in his cutting three "appendages" (meaning ears and/or tails) from bulls laid on by the Urquijo and Bohórquez ranches, a feat considered a resounding success in the bullfighting world.

On 18 May 1967, Rivera saw his alternativa confirmed at Las Ventas in Madrid. Standing once again as "godfather" was Paco Camino, and bearing witness this time was José Fuentes. The bull supplier for this occasion was once again the Juan Pedro Domecq ranch, and the bull that Rivera fought for his confirmation was Alelado, a red beast weighing 518 kg.

This engagement was significant for Rivera in another way: he had never trodden the albero (the finely crushed rock covering the bullfighting ground) at the capital's bullring as a novillero.

Las Ventas brought Rivera more bullfighting glory than it did most bullfighters, and over the years, he was borne shoulder-high out through the Great Gate six times, thrice in 1969 alone:

- 17 May 1969 — after leaving a bull from the Don Francisco Galache de Hernandinos ranch earless;
- 22 May 1969 — after cutting two ears from bulls from the Don Juan María Pérez-Tabernero Montalvo ranch;
- 12 June 1969 — after cutting two ears from bulls from the Don Lisardo Sánchez ranch;
- 21 May 1974 — after cutting three ears from bulls from the Don Anastasio Fernández Iglesias ranch;
- 24 May 1979 — after cutting three ears from bulls from the Torrestrella ranch;
- 19 June 1980 — after cutting one ear from a bull from the Don Pablo Romero ranch and another from a bull from the Don Samuel Flores ranch.

In 1967, Rivera appeared at 67 corridas, in 1968, at 69, and in 1969, at 70.

On 29 November 1970, Rivera's alternativa was confirmed yet again at the Plaza de Toros México in Mexico City. The "godfather" was Raúl Contreras "Finito", while the witness was Manuel Martínez Ancira ("Manolo Martínez"). Bulls were supplied by the José Julián Llaguno ranch, and the one that Rivera fought for the ceremony was Caporal. The other bull that he fought at that corrida he left earless.

Rivera's bullfighting career reached its peak, at least going by the number of engagements that he secured, in 1972, when he saw himself on the bill at eighty-six events, putting him at the top of the escalafón (bullfighters' rankings). Outstanding though the figures might have been, the bullfighter's lack of appearances at the Seville Fair owing to disputes with José María Jardón's company meant that he nevertheless had to work quite hard to maintain the standard that had been expected of him in earlier bullfighting seasons.

Rivera did, however, appear at the Maestranza on 29 April 1972, which was a particularly triumphant occasion for him. Seldom is a bullfighter awarded four ears at the same corrida, but after fighting Gavillador – a Carlos Núñez bull – and one other, he left both earless.

An autumn bullfighting tour of Venezuela this same year was not without its rough patches. On 14 October, Rivera was facing down a bull at the Nuevo Circo de Caracas in Venezuela's capital when his opponent gored him in the right groin. This occasioned not only a long convalescence, but also an operation afterwards to treat a hernia that this injury had caused.

On 21 April 1978, Rivera suffered another very serious goring, again in the groin (according to one report, in both thighs), at the Maestranza in Seville during the Seville Fair, inflicted by the afternoon's fifth bull, named Locares, from the José Luis Osborne ranch.

Rivera's severe injury healed, this time, and a month afterwards, he was fighting bulls again, even to the extent of reaping three ears and one tail at an appearance in El Puerto de Santa María.

A fight with a bull named Buenasuerte, from the Torrestrella ranch, in Madrid on 23 May 1979 is particularly well remembered.

The few years that followed, however, saw a decline in Rivera's physical condition, and therefore in his bullfighting career. He did, however, remain in the news, albeit mainly in the gossip columns (or "the pink press", as one source calls it) owing to his often changing love life.

== Deathblow at Pozoblanco ==
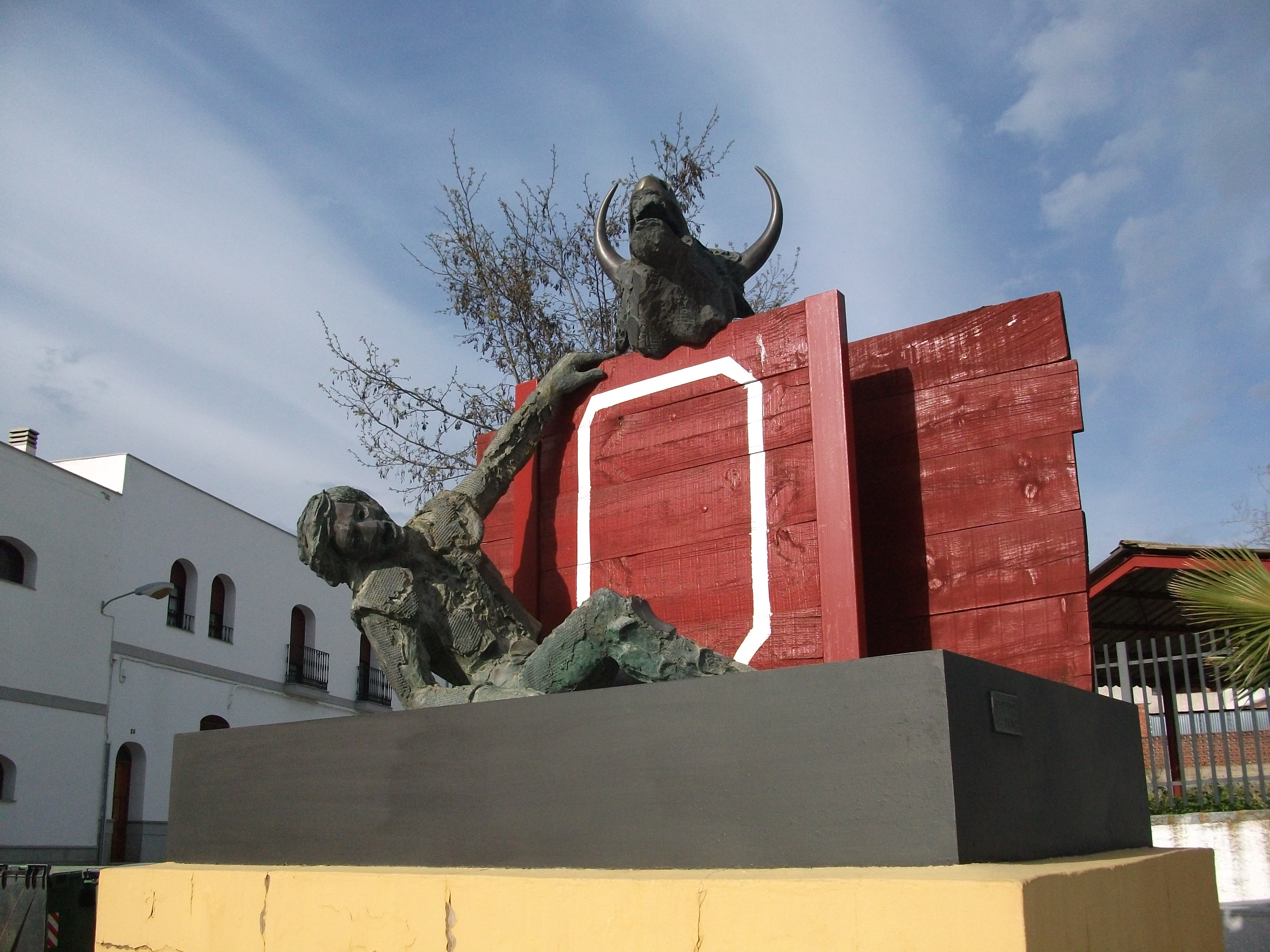
Monument to Paquirri, mortally wounded at the Pozoblanco bullring; unveiled April 2010

In 1984, Rivera had at first decided to end the bullfighting season after his engagement at the Dax bullring in the south of France, but most fatefully, he agreed to appear at two further corridas, one at Logroño and the other at Pozoblanco.

For the corrida at Pozoblanco, Córdoba, according to what Rivera's widow Isabel Pantoja has said, the bullfighter several times changed the date, the bull ranch and the bulls that he would have to fight at the Pozoblanco bullring. It was thus fate that led to what happened there on 26 September 1984, when, sharing billing with José Cubero Sánchez ("el Yiyo") and Vicente Ruiz Soro ("El Soro"), the afternoon's fourth bull, named Avispado (whose name meant "sly" or "clever"), weighing 420 kg, from the Sayalero y Bandrés ranch, badly gored him, the goring from the thin-horned bull taking two paths through his flesh, piercing the external iliac vein, the great saphenous vein, and the femoral artery. A video, shot by cameraman Antonio Salmoral, shows the incident and scenes of the bullfighter speaking at the bullring's infirmary. Rivera, still conscious, and notably calm given the circumstances, was explaining to the doctor Eliseo Morán the size and path of his wound:

Doctor, I want to speak to you or I shall not remain calm. The goring is strong. It has at least two paths, one through here and another through there. Open all that you must open, the rest is in your hands. And calm, doctor.

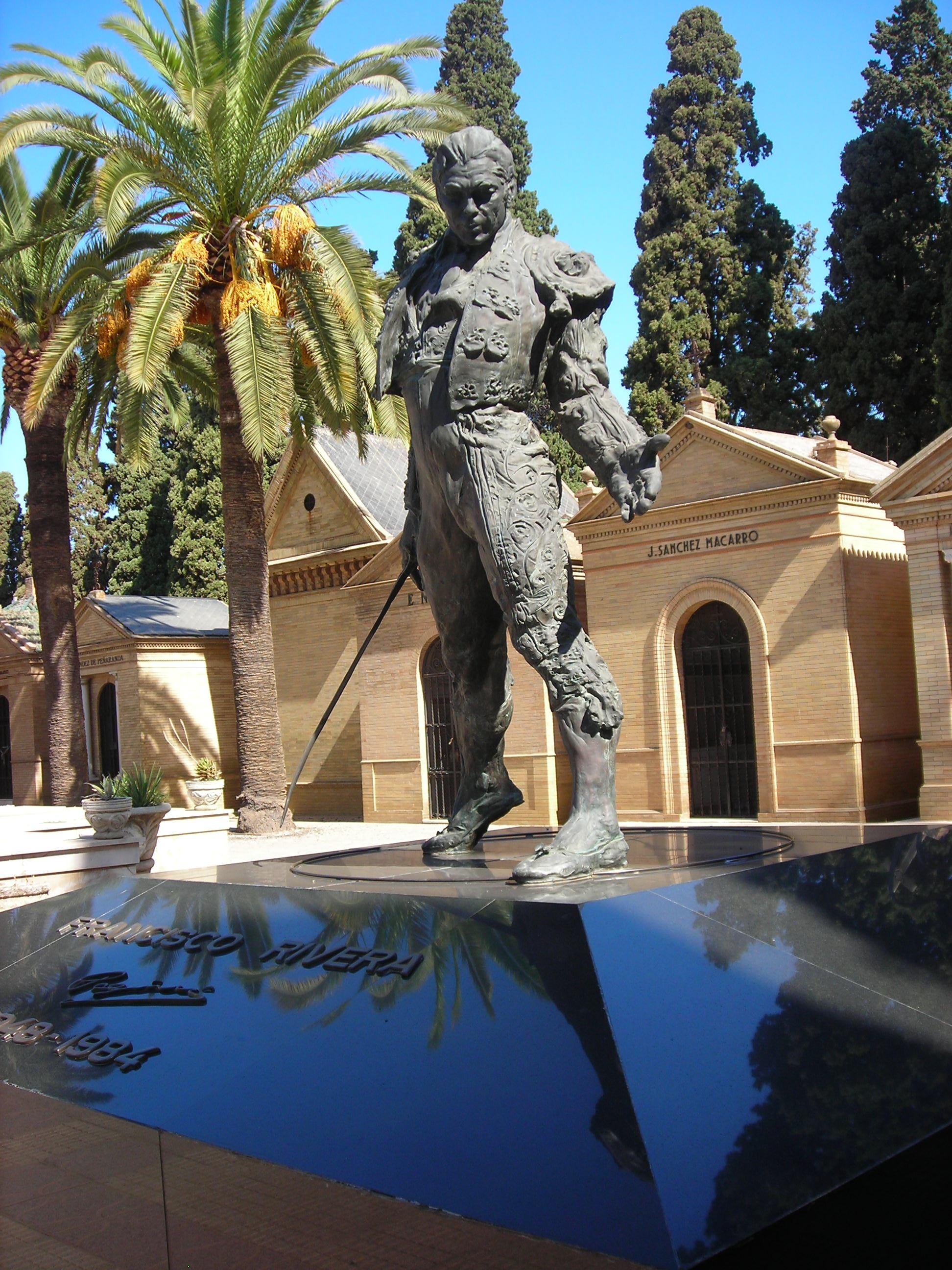
Rivera's mausoleum at the Cemetery of San Fernando in Seville.

The bullfighter could not have received the best attention owing to the infirmary's limitations. Without being able to contain the haemorrhage, Doctor Morán gave him emergency treatment and, given the extreme seriousness of the bullfighter's condition, had him transferred at once to the Hospital Reina Sofía in Córdoba; Doctors Ruiz and Fumes rode along with the stricken Rivera in the ambulance. On the way to Córdoba, he suffered a cardiac arrest, and in a desperate attempt to save the bullfighter's life, they decided to turn into the Military Hospital instead of their originally intended destination, as it was much nearer. However, Rivera died there.

Even though, according to the doctor who treated Rivera, the goring was not in itself deadly, the bullfighter's death owed itself to a fatal set of circumstances: the sanitary services on which the bullring relied were very limited; he was transferred in a conventional ambulance; and the roadway that joined both localities was in poor condition. The prominence that his death had in the press contributed to changing legislation governing bullfighting spectacles, requiring that bullrings of all categories have mobile intensive care units, and that those of the first and second categories have properly equipped operating theatres.

The consequent judicial proceedings brought to light that Rivera had died of intense hypovolemic shock through massive and rapid haemorrhage.

After his death, Rivera's body was driven to Seville, and there, a funeral was held at the White Fathers' Church. The journey to the graveyard first stopped at Seville's bullring, the Maestranza (popularly known as the Baratillo), so that the late bullfighter could do one more round of the arena, on companions' and followers' shoulders, and thousands of people bid him farewell. Then, he was driven to the Cemetery of San Fernando.

It was less than a year later, on 30 August 1985 at the Colmenar Viejo bullring, that Rivera's fellow bullfighter that fateful day at Pozoblanco, José Cubero Sánchez, himself suffered a fatal goring by a bull named Burlero from the Marcos Núñez ranch. Because of this unfortunate coincidence, the bullfighting engagement at Pozoblanco in 1984 is sometimes called el cartel maldito de Pozoblanco — "the cursed bill of Pozoblanco".

Unveiled in September 1991 was a monumental bronze sculpture in Rivera's memory outside the El Puerto de Santa María bullring. It depicts a scene with Rivera and a bull, with the bullfighter performing a porta gayola move. The sculpture has, according to the source, "a notable realism and dynamism in its composition". It was created by Venezuelan sculptor Manuel de la Fuente.

== Personal life ==
Rivera's first marriage was to Carmen Ordóñez, bullfighter Antonio Ordóñez Araujo's daughter, on 16 February 1973 at the Royal Basilica of Saint Francis the Great in Madrid. Two sons were born of this union, who in time both became bullfighters: Francisco Rivera Ordóñez and Cayetano Rivera Ordóñez. Rivera and Carmen legally separated on 16 February 1979.

After the separation, Rivera had a relationship with Bárbara Rey, and then later with the singer Lolita Flores.

On 30 April 1983, Rivera wed for the second time, with the singer Isabel Pantoja as the bride. The matrimonial ceremony was performed at the Basílica de Jesús del Gran Poder in Seville and was an event dubbed the wedding of the year, reportedly costing ₧ 1,500,000. Rivera and Pantoja had one child together, Francisco José Rivera Pantoja, known as "Paquirrín".

== See also ==
- Spanish Fighting Bull
- Spanish-style bullfighting
- Bullfighter
- Other Spanish bullfighters who were killed by bulls:
  - Víctor Barrio
  - José Cubero Sánchez
  - Iván Fandiño
  - José Gómez Ortega
  - Manolete
  - Pepete
