= The Dangerous Summer =

1985 posthumous book by Ernest Hemingway

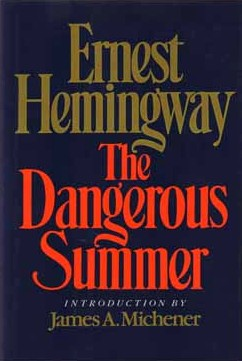
- First edition
- Author: Ernest Hemingway
- Language: English
- Subject: Bullfighting
- Publisher: Charles Scribner's Sons
- Publication date: June 1985
- Publication place: United States
- Media type: Print (hardcover and paperback)
- Pages: 228
- ISBN: 0-684-18355-2

The Dangerous Summer is a nonfiction book by Ernest Hemingway published posthumously in 1985 and written in 1959 and 1960. The book describes the rivalry between bullfighters Luis Miguel Dominguín and his brother-in-law, Antonio Ordóñez, during the "dangerous summer" of 1959. It is one of two books Hemingway wrote about bullfighting, the other being Death in the Afternoon (1932). The Dangerous Summer has been cited as the last book Hemingway wrote, although at the time of his death in 1961, he had several unfinished manuscripts which were later published by his family.

== Background ==
The Dangerous Summer is an edited version of a 75,000-word manuscript Hemingway wrote between October 1959 and May 1960 as an assignment from Life magazine. Hemingway summoned his close friend Will Lang Jr. to come to Spain to deliver the story to Life. The book was edited from the original manuscript by his American publisher Charles Scribner's Sons. A 30,000-word extract from the script was published in three consecutive installments in Life in September 1960.

Author James Michener wrote the 33-page introduction which includes Michener's personal knowledge of bullfights and famous matadors, a comprehensive glossary of terms related to each stage of a bullfight, and unvarnished personal anecdotes of Hemingway.

== Account of the season ==
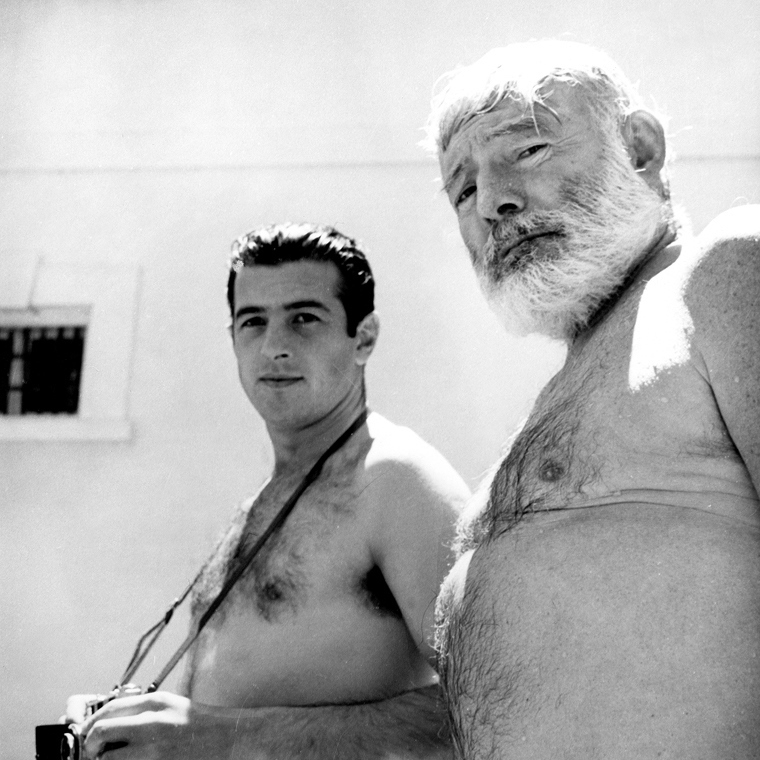
Antonio Ordóñez and Ernest Hemingway, 1959 Málaga, Spain.

The book charts the rise of Antonio Ordóñez (the son of Cayetano Ordóñez, the bullfighter whose technique and ring exploits Hemingway fictionalized in his novel, The Sun Also Rises) during a season of bullfights during 1959. During a fight on May 13, 1959, in Aranjuez, Ordóñez is badly gored but remains in the ring and kills the bull, a performance rewarded by trophies of both the bull's ears, its tail, and a hoof.

By contrast, Luis Miguel Dominguín is already famous as a bullfighter and returns to the ring after several years of retirement. Less naturally gifted than Ordóñez, his pride and self-confidence draw him into an intense rivalry with the newcomer, and the two meet in the ring several times during the season. Starting the season supremely confident, Dominguín is slowly humbled by this competition. While Ordóñez displays breathtaking skill and artistry in his fights, performing highly dangerous, classical passés, Dominguín often resorts to what Hemingway describes as "tricks", moves that look impressive to the crowd but that are actually much safer. Nevertheless, Dominguín is gored badly at a fight in Valencia, and Ordóñez is gored shortly afterwards. Less than a month later, the two bullfighters meet in the ring again for what Hemingway described as "one of the greatest bullfights I have ever seen", "an almost perfect bullfight unmarred by any tricks." From the six bulls which they fight, the pair win ten ears, four tails and two hooves as trophies, an extraordinary feat. Their final meeting takes place in Bilbao, with Dominguín receiving a near-fatal goring and Ordóñez demonstrating absolute mastery by performing the recibiendo kill, one of the oldest and most dangerous moves. Ordóñez's recibiendo requires three attempts, displaying the fighter's artistry and bravery that Hemingway likens to that of legendary bullfighter Pedro Romero.
