= Cayetano Rivera Ordóñez =

Spanish bullfighter (born 1977)

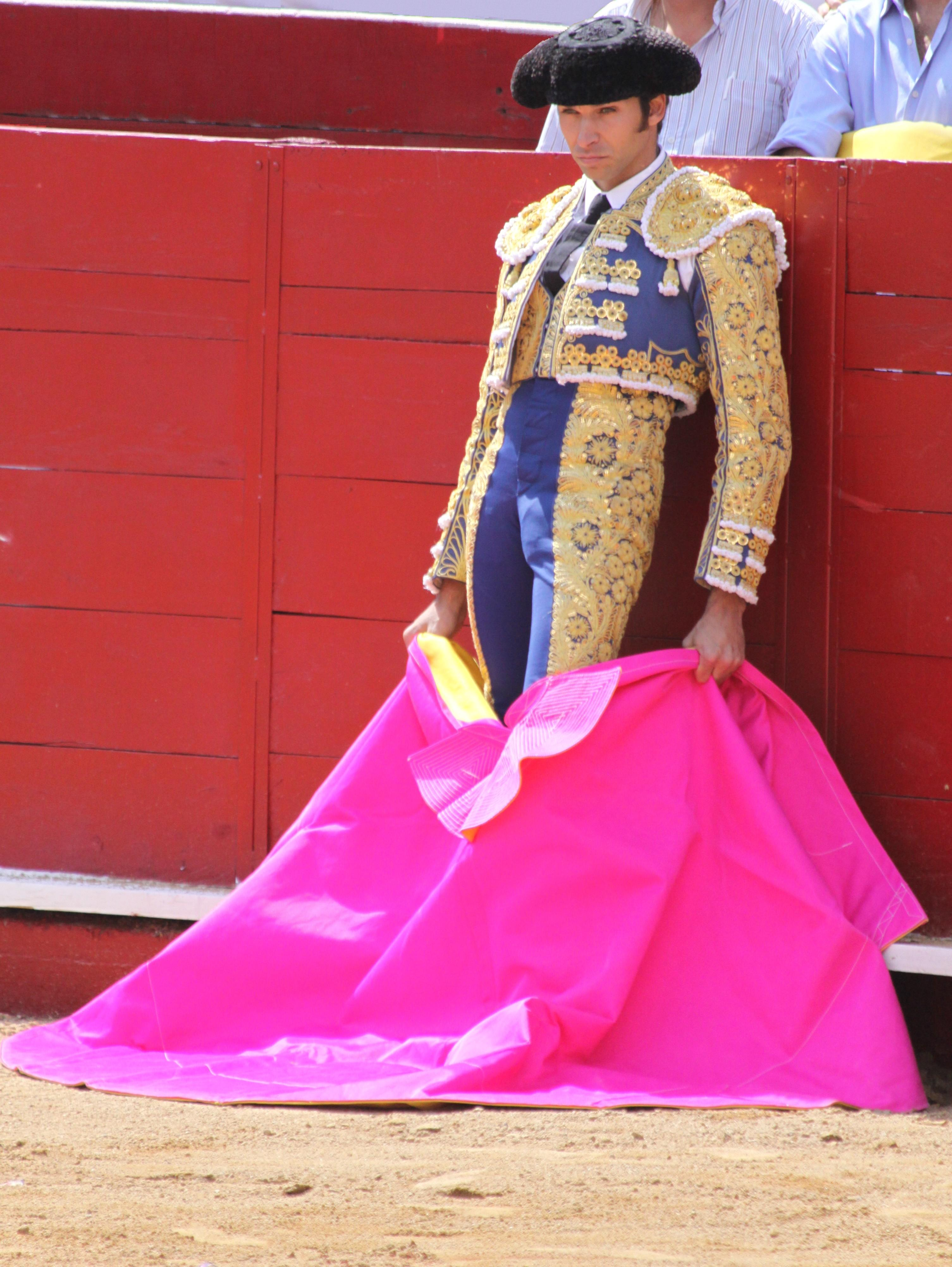
- Ordóñez in 2010

Personal information
- Born: Antonio Cayetano Rivera Ordóñez; 13 January 1977 (age 49) Madrid, Spain

Sport
- Sport: Bullfighting
- Rank: Matador

Antonio Cayetano Rivera Ordóñez (born 13 January 1977) is a Spanish torero or bullfighter.

== Family ties ==
Rivera is the son of Francisco Rivera 'Paquirri' and Carmen Ordóñez.

He belongs to a long line of famous bullfighters: his great-grandfather was Cayetano Ordóñez, who fought under the name 'El Niño de la Palma', and was the inspiration for the young matador in Ernest Hemingway's novel The Sun Also Rises. His grandfather, the great matador Antonio Ordóñez, was a friend of Hemingway and of Orson Welles. Antonio is the subject, with Cayetano's torero great-uncle Luis Miguel Dominguín, of Hemingway's book The Dangerous Summer. His father Paquirri was killed by the bull Avispado when Cayetano was 8. His elder brother is the matador Francisco Rivera Ordóñez.

== Career ==
Rivera made his novice debut 'con picadores' on 26 March 2005. On 9 September 2006 he took his 'alternativa' to become a full matador in the bullring with which his family is most associated in Ronda with his brother, Francisco, as his 'padrino.' He cut four ears of the two bulls he fought that day.

In 2007 he was on the cover of Vogue with Penélope Cruz for an editorial titled 'Made in Spain' shot by Annie Leibovitz.

Rivera met Giorgio Armani in Valencia in 2006 and the Italian designer proposed to design a 'suit of lights' for Rivera to wear during the bullfights of the world famous 'feria goyesca' celebrating the first matador, Pedro Romero, in his - and Rivera's - hometown of Ronda. Cayetano's grandfather founded the feria in the 1950s and Pablo Picasso designed his suit for him. Cayetano has also represented the men's luxury fashion house Loewe as brand ambassador.

During the 2009 season he fought in 58 festivals and cut 77 ears, ranking him as number 6 in Spain on the Escalafón Matadores, the 'Matadors Ladder', up from number 16 in 2008.

That year, before a corrida in Sanlúcar de Barrameda, he met with British author and amateur bullfighter Alexander Fiske-Harrison, for an interview for The Times. He invited Fiske-Harrison to join him in the bullring, and, later that year, to stay with him and his family during the 'feria goyesca' in Ronda. This is recounted in Into The Arena: The World Of The Spanish Bullfight. (The book went on to be shortlisted for the William Hill Sports Book of the Year in 2011.)

In September 2012 the documentary filmmaker Stevan Riley, in an interview with Screen International about his cinema documentary Everything And Nothing: 50 Years Of James Bond, said that he was currently making a feature-length documentary on bullfighting with Cayetano for cinematic release. It is being produced by the Academy Award-winning John Battsek's Passion Pictures. Fiske-Harrison is the writer on the project and is co-producing it with Mephisto Productions. Cayetano soon afterwards announced his temporary retirement from professional bullfighting to pursue "other projects".
