= José Romero (bullfighter) =

Spanish bullfighter (1744/45–??)

José Romero was a Spanish bullfighter who performed during the late 18th and early 19th century. When bullfighting was prohibited in 1804 he was obliged to retire. Years later, in 1818, several bullfights were organised in Madrid in aid of the Brotherhood of Saint Andrew. José was invited to participate but on the first day was injured by a banderilla and was thereafter unable to continue as a bullfighter. He was 73 years old at the time. His rivals included, mainly, Pepe Hillo.

Juan was part of the Romero dynasty of Ronda.
