= Juan Romero (bullfighter) =

Juan Romero was a famous matador. He achieved a reputation as a safe bullfighter and was one of the best paid. He appears as one of the first to condemn improvised bullfights. He organized his own team of assistants and forced bullrings to hire them. According to the Catholic Encyclopedia, he "was the first to organize a cuadrilla de toreros (band, or company, of bullfighters)."

== Family ==
He had seven children, six of them boys, four of whom became bullfighters-Gaspar, Antonio, José and Pedro. His daughter María Isabel married another key figure of the bullfighting world, José Cándido from Chiclana. The eldest son Gaspar died in the Salamanca bullring on 16 September 1773 whilst serving as a banderillero for his father. The youngest, Antonio, was gored to death by the bull Ollero in Granada on 5 May 1802. Juan was part of the bullfighter family called Romero dynasty of Ronda.
