= Edward Lewine =

American author and freelance journalist

- Status: married
- Occupations: journalist, author
- Notable credit(s): The New York Times, Details, MSNBC, New York Daily News
- Spouse: Megan Liberman
- Children: Noah Milton Lewine, Charlotte Sophia Lewine

Edward Lewine is an American author and freelance journalist who has written extensively for The New York Times. He currently works as Vice President of Communications for the auction house Christie's. He has been a speechwriter for New York Attorney General Letitia James and for Mayor Bill de Blasio of New York City.

Lewine has also written for Details and Slate.com. He was a staff writer at the New York Daily News and has done film reviews for MSNBC. He is the author of two books. Death and the Sun, an account of a year in the life of a Spanish matador and What's a Homeowner To Do? a humorous and informative guide to living in and taking care of a house. Lewine began his career in the art world. He was the head of the Old Master Drawings Department at Christie's New York in the early 1990s.

== Personal ==
Lewine is the son of the late Milton J. Lewine, a professor of art history at Columbia University, and Carol F. Lewine, a professor of art history at Queens College.

Lewine is married to Margaret Liberman, who was named web editor of The New York Times Magazine in March 2007 and has been Newsroom Editor for Blogs since 2011.

== Bibliography ==
- Death and the Sun: A Matador's Season in the Heart of Spain. (hardcover) New York: Houghton Mifflin, 2005. ISBN 0-618-26325-X ISBN 978-0618263257 (paperback) New York: Houghton Mifflin, 2007. ISBN info TK
- "What's a Home Owner To Do?" (Paperback) New York: Artisan, 2011. ISBN 978-1-57965-433-7, with Stephen Fanuka.
