= Francisco Rivera Ordóñez =

Spanish torero or 'bullfighter' (born 1974)

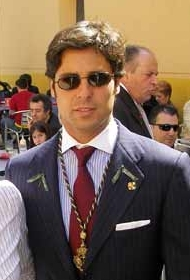
- Born: Francisco de Asís Rivera Ordóñez; January 3, 1974 (age 51); Madrid, Spain
- Occupation: Bullfighter
- Spouses: Eugenia Martínez de Irujo, 12th Duchess of Montoro (m. 1998; div. 2002) Lourdes Beatriz Montes Parejo (m. 2013)
- Children: 2
- Parent(s): Carmen Ordóñez; Francisco Rivera Paquirri
- Website: www.riveraordonez.com/

Francisco de Asís Rivera Ordóñez (prev. The Duke of Montoro; born 3 January 1974 in Madrid) is a Spanish torero or bullfighter.

== Family lineage ==
Rivera comes from a long line of famous bullfighters: his great-grandfather was Cayetano Ordóñez, El Niño de la Palma; his grandfather was Antonio Ordóñez; his great-uncle was Luis Miguel Dominguín; his father was Francisco Rivera Paquirri; his brother is Cayetano Rivera Ordóñez; his cousin is José Antonio Canales Rivera.

== Bullfighting career ==
In 2009, he was awarded the Fine Arts medal by the Culture Ministry of Spain, a coveted bullfighting prize, but his receipt resulted in a public outcry.

== Personal life ==
He is the son of Paquirri (Francisco Rivera) and Carmen Ordóñez, and his brother is the matador Cayetano Rivera Ordóñez. His father’s second wife was Isabel Pantoja, with whom Francisco has a half-brother, Francisco José Rivera Pantoja.

He has one daughter, Cayetana Rivera y Martínez de Irujo (born October 16, 1999), from his marriage to Eugenia Martínez de Irujo, 12th Duchess of Montoro, on October 23, 1998. The couple divorced in 2002. Eugenia's mother was the Duchess of Alba, Cayetana Fitz-James Stuart, who was the most titled noble in the world.

In 2011, Francisco Rivera started dating Lourdes Beatriz Montes Parejo, then a 27-year-old lawyer from Sevilla.

They married on September 14, 2013 in Ronda. They have a daughter, named Carmen (born August 19, 2015).

== Books ==
Rivera Ordóñez, who is known in the press as "Fran", was the subject of the book Death and the Sun: A Matador's Season in the Heart of Spain by American journalist Edward Lewine. In 2012 he was again involved in a book, The Bull and The Ban by filmmaker Catherine Tosko and British bullfighter and writer Alexander Fiske-Harrison.

== See also ==
- List of bullfighters
