= Cayetano Ordóñez =

Spanish bullfighter (1904–1961)

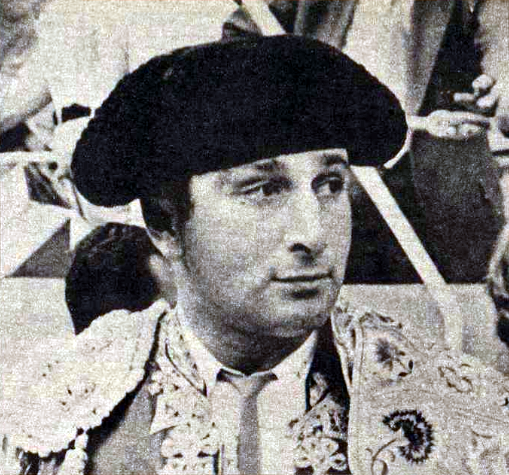
- Ordóñez at a bullfight
- Born: Cayetano Ordóñez y Aguilera; January 4, 1904; Ronda, Spain
- Died: October 30, 1961 (aged 57); Madrid, Spain

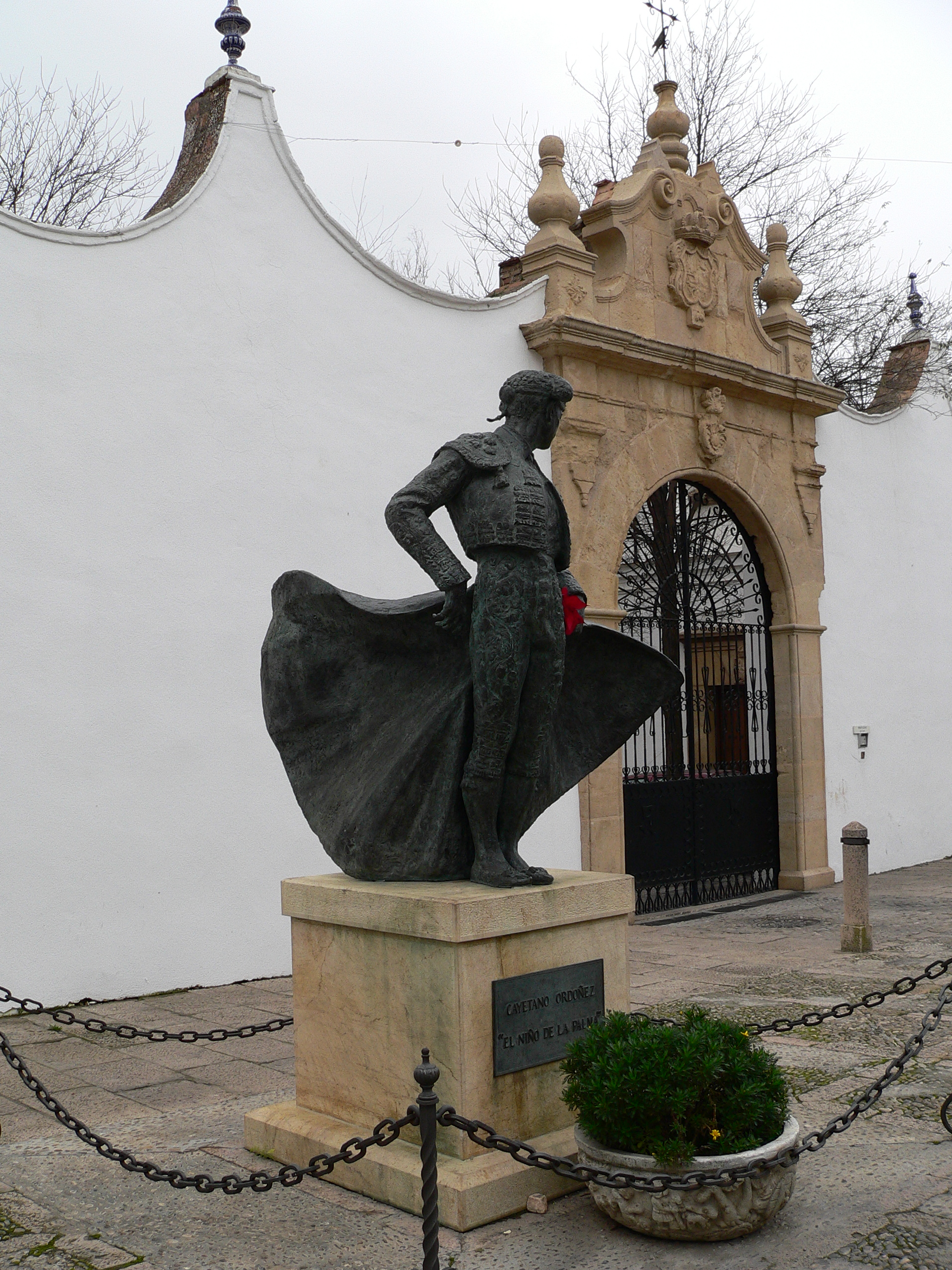
Cayetano statue in Ronda, Málaga

Cayetano Ordóñez y Aguilera (January 24, 1904, Ronda, Spain - October 30, 1961, Madrid, Spain) is the patriarch of the Ordóñez family of bullfighters.

His parents owned a shoe shop called La Palma, which gave him his nickname (Niño de la Palma). In 1917 he first began to perform as a bullfighter in the ranches of the area where he lived. In 1923 he had his debut in Ronda, where he became the first bullfighter to be carried in triumph through the main gates of the Maestranza, and in 1924 he caused great commotion again when the same thing happened in Seville.

From that point on he was greatly in demand by all the professional and amateur rings in Spain. He was used by Ernest Hemingway as the model for "Pedro Romero", the talented young bullfighter in The Sun Also Rises. Hemingway later stated that "everything that happened in the ring was true, and everything outside was fiction. Nino knew this and never complained about it."

His last bullfight was at Aranda de Duero in 1942. He was the director of the Lisbon School of Bullfighting. He died in Madrid on 30 October 1961.

His sons mainly became bullfighters, Antonio Ordóñez becoming one of the most important in post-Civil War Spain and subject of Hemingway's book The Dangerous Summer. His great-grandsons, Francisco and Cayetano Rivera Ordóñez are famous matadors still working in Spain today.

== See also ==
- List of bullfighters
- Plaza de Toros de Ronda
