= Gloria Romero León =

Mexican politician

Personal details
- Born: 25 January 1964 (age 62) Pachuca, Hidalgo, Mexico
- Party: PAN

Gloria Romero León (born 25 January 1964) is a Mexican politician from the National Action Party (PAN).

Romero León was born in Pachuca, Hidalgo, in 1964. In the 2009 mid-terms she was elected to the Chamber of Deputies as a plurinominal deputy for the fifth region, where she served for the 61st session of Congress (2009 to 2012).
