= Francisco Romero (bullfighter) =

Spanish matador (1700–1763)

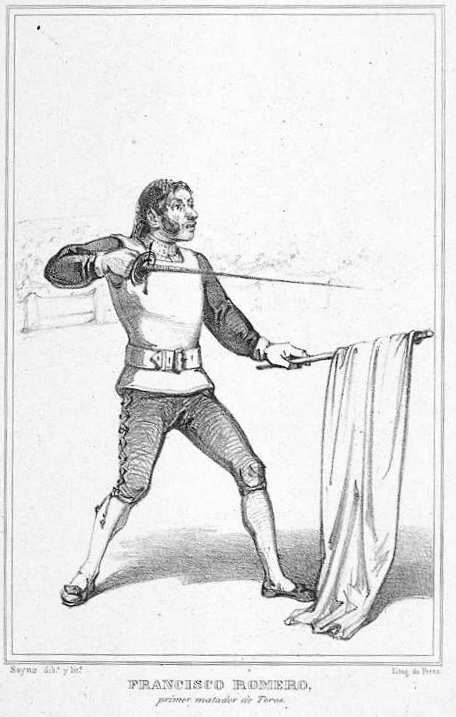
- Francisco Romero first bullfighter. Saynz lithograph.
- Born: Francisco Romero y Acevedo; 1700; Ronda, Andalusia, Spain
- Died: 1763 (aged 63); Ronda, Andalusia, Spain
- Citizenship: Spanish
- Occupations: Matador; Bullfighter
- Known for: Pioneering the modern style of on-foot bullfighting

Francisco Romero (1700–1763) was a significant Spanish matador. He reputedly introduced bullfighting on foot and with a red cape (muleta) around 1726.

He may have been the first bullfighter to kill a bull face to face, and therefore the inventor of several characteristics that started to be used in a key period for bullfighting when the modern on foot system was defined, such as the use of the muleta (cape) and estoque (sword). He was the founding father of a bullfighting dynasty, fundamental for bullfighting history. He was the father of Juan Romero, also a bullfighter, and grandfather of Pedro Romero (1754–1839), who killed some 5,600 bulls in his 28-year career, and founded a bullfighting school at Sevilla in 1830.

== Biography ==
Little is known about his life. He was born in Ronda around 1700. During the first years of the 18th century, at Ronda, Francisco Romero, at the end of a bullfight, asked for permission to kill the bull by himself. Up to this moment, only nobles mounted on horses dared to fight a bull, the so-called "bullfighting on horseback". That afternoon, however, Romero faced the bull on foot, and after provoking him and summoning him two or three times with a linen (small pieces of fabric draped over a stick), Romero killed the bull with the help of a long, curved sword, which he placed over the horns. The risk to the man, as well as the dramatic tension of this part of the spectacle, was thereby greatly increased, and Romero soon repeated this process at other bullrings and he became an authentic professional, giving birth to the modern style of on foot bullfighting. The use of linens (white ones and hanging from a stick) could have been done before Romero's feat. Those linens evolved step by step towards the modern muleta or red cape and capote or purple and yellow cape, but it is very plausible that was Romero the one that popularized his use as the bullfight essential prop.

It seems that the death of a bull by sword was practiced previously, especially by the employees of meat processing factories in Sevilla, but not in a bullring. In any case, if Romero is not the inventor of the modern bullfight, he is the first matador who became professional and made a living from bull fighting (he was originally a carpenter by trade). His success implied a fundamental and radical change in the bullfight art: Before Romero’s stylistic innovations, the main spectacle was the corrida (bullfight or bullrun), in which a mounted bullfighter piked the bull from a horse, followed by bullfighting on horse and then some use of cape by helpers on foot, but the horse rider was the protagonist of the bull party. The death of the animal, at this stage of the corrida’s evolution, was of little aesthetic or dramatic significance, and it was thus not particularly celebrated, with the events revolving around the mounted torero.

After Romero, and after some years when both bullfighting styles (on foot and riding a horse) fought for public support, on-horse bullfight started to lose the protagonist role it had and the death of the bull by a lonely man on foot, armed only with a sword, became the most important part of a bullfight. By the end of the 18th century the demand for the bullfight increased in popularity amongst the general public. This led to a loss of the exclusive right to fight bulls that the nobility had.

== See also ==
List of male bullfighters
