= Pepete (José Gallego Mateo) =

Spanish bullfighter

José Gallego Mateo
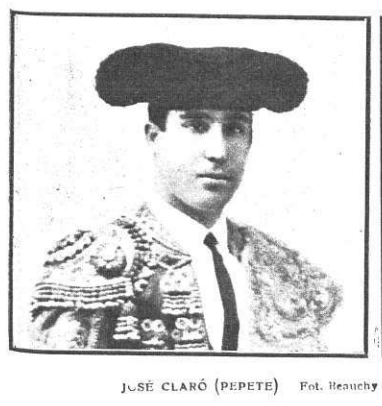

Personal information
- Nickname: Pepete
- Nationality: Spanish
- Born: 19 March 1883 Seville, Spain
- Died: 7 September 1910 (aged 27) Murcia, Spain
- Occupation: Matador
- Years active: 1905–1910

Sport
- Sport: Bullfighting

José Gallego Mateo (19 March 1883 – 7 September 1910), known as Pepete III, was a Spanish matador.

== Career ==
The Seville-born matador José Gallego Mateo appeared on carteles taurinos, or promotional posters, as José Claro "Pepete," likely because his patronym Gallego seemed ill-suited for a bullfighter. (Gallego means "Galician," and there were no bullrings in Galicia at the time.)

After taking the alternativa in 1905, the right-hander appeared as a bullfighter in Spain and especially in Mexico. According to his contemporaries, he was brave and had a good technique, but he was seriously injured frequently—seven times throughout his five-year career as a matador.

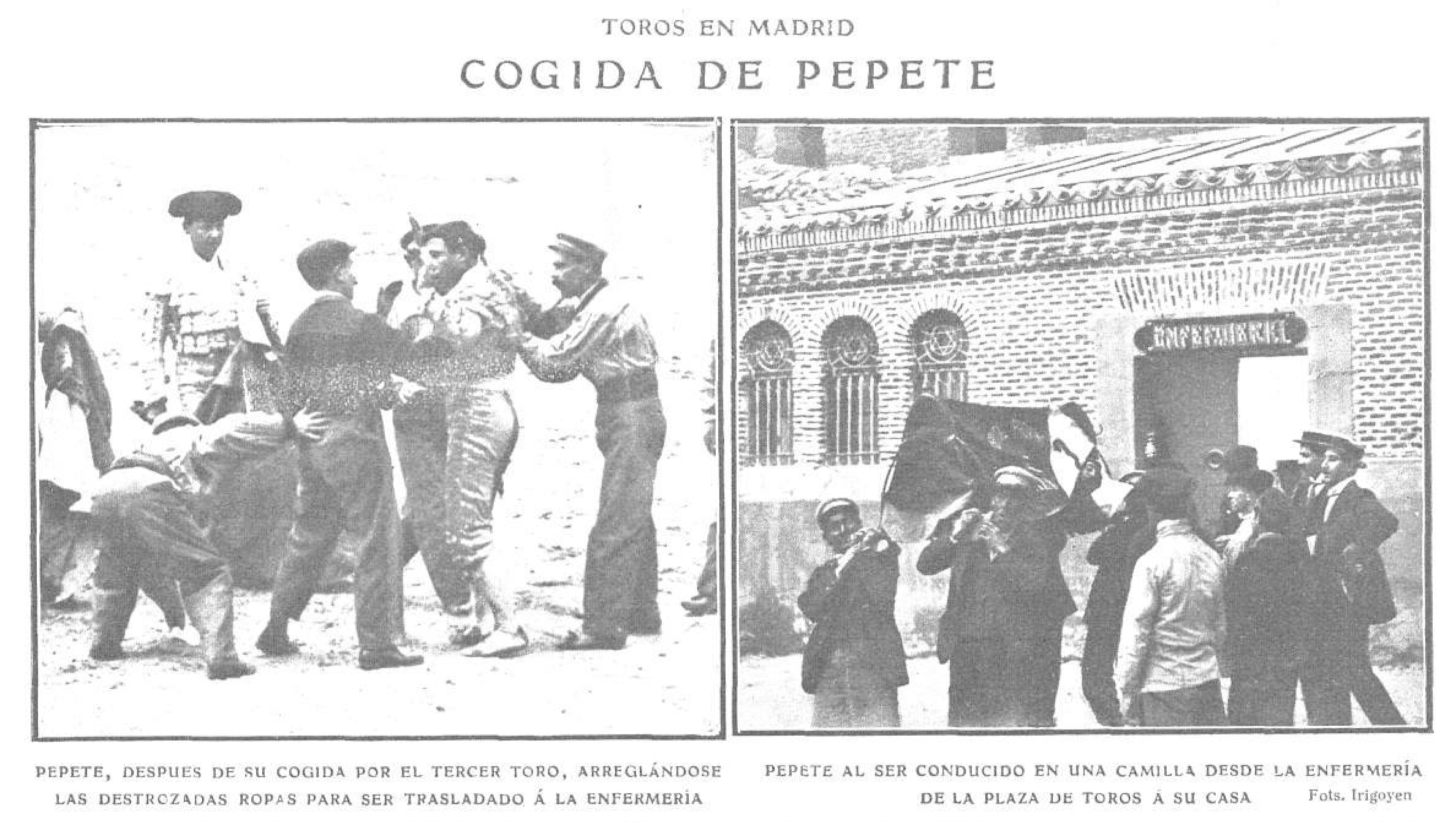
A report of one of Pepete's injuries in 1909.

On 7 September 1910, at the Murcia bullring during a mano a mano with the bullfighter Machaquito, the first bull of the afternoon, "Estudiante" from the Parladé ranch, knocked down a picador. Pepete rushed to help the picador, but the bull sank his horn into the matador's right thigh, rupturing his femoral artery. Pepete died only a few minutes later at the bullring's infirmary.
