= E. Antonio Romero =

Guatemalan writer

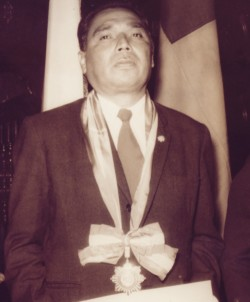
E. Antonio Romero.

E. Antonio Romero (1925–2005) was a Guatemalan philosopher, historian, and writer.
