= Diego Romero (footballer, born 1988) =

Argentine footballer

Diego Hernán Romero (born June 13, 1988, in Río Grande, Argentina) is an Argentine footballer currently playing as a forward for Deportes Concepción of the Primera División B in Chile.

== Teams ==
- (Argentina) C.A.I. 2007–2011
- (Argentina) Patronato de Paraná 2011–2012
- (Argentina) Olimpo de Bahía Blanca 2012–2013
- (Chile) Deportes Concepción 2013–present
