= Francisco Romero (philosopher) =

Latin American philosopher (1891–1962)

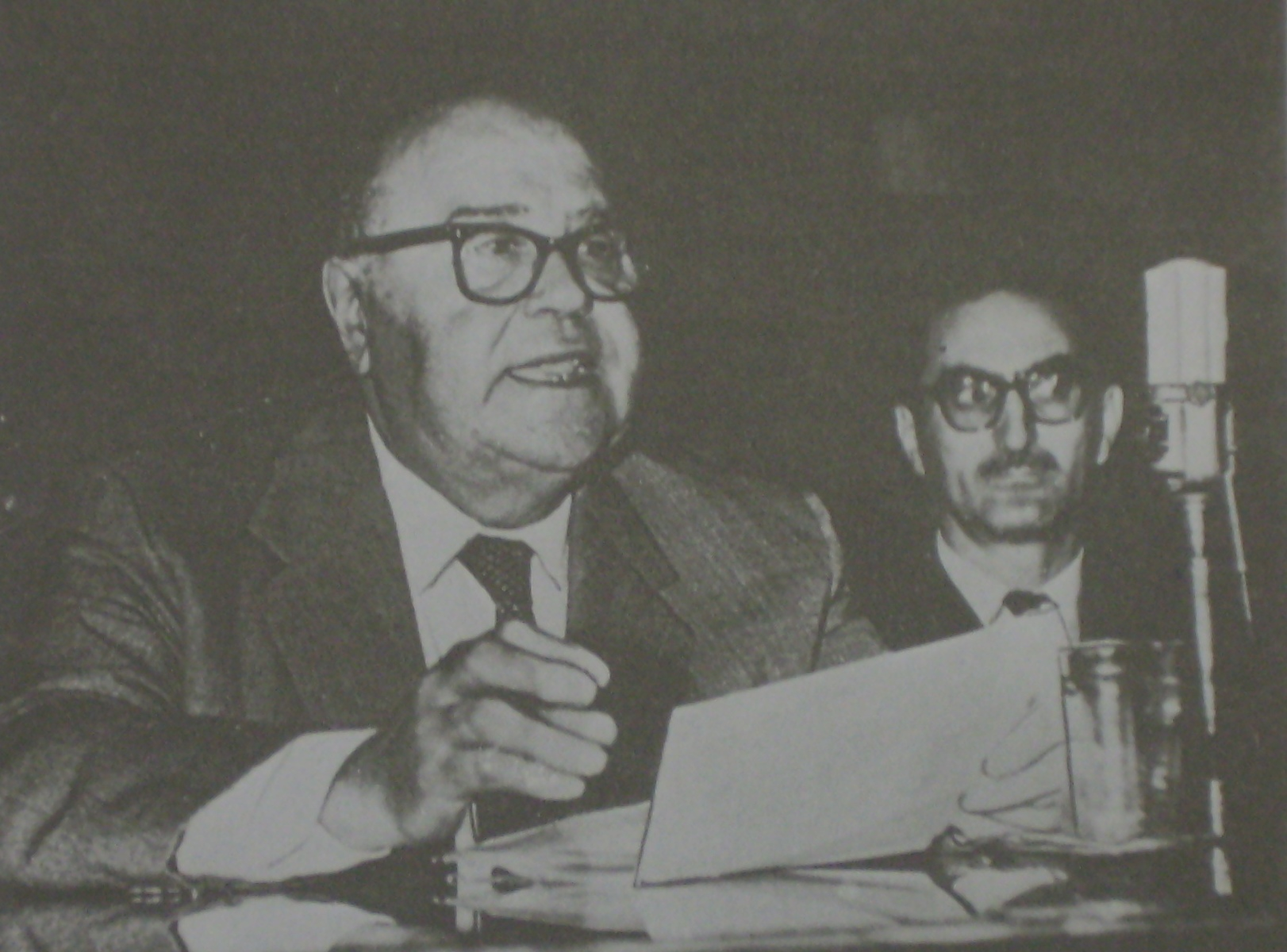

Francisco Romero (1891–1962) was a Latin American philosopher who spearheaded a reaction against positivism.

== Biography ==
Romero was born in Seville, Spain, but spent much of his adult life in Latin America, especially Argentina, where he emigrated in 1904. He entered the Argentine army in 1910 and retired with the rank of major in 1931. He became a friend of the Argentine philosopher Alejandro Korn, and when he left military service he took over Korn's professorships at the universities of La Plata and Buenos Aires. Due to his strong disapproval of the Peronist government, he resigned his university positions in 1946, not returning until 1955.

Romero began to publish on literary subjects during the First World War. Known as the "dean of Ibero-American philosophers," he became an influential critic, philosopher, and translator. Romero is interested in examining the space of human culture, especially with respect to creativity and social responsibility. A strongly anti-ideological humanist, he argues against Humean rationalism and all deterministic conceptions of the universe. True being is identified by Romero with transcendence, spiritual and moral aspiration, and intentionality. His writing is marked by a balance between philosophical rigor and literary sophistication, and Theory of Man (1952; English translation in 1964) is considered his master work.

Romero was also editor in charge of philosophical publications at the Losada publishing house.

He died in Buenos Aires in 1962.

== Selected works ==
- Old and New Concepts of Reality (1932)
- The Problems of Philosophy of Culture (1938)
- Program of a Philosophy (1940)
- Man and Culture (1950, translation of El hombre y la cultura)
- Theory of Man (1964; translation of Teoría del hombre, 1952)
- Historia de la filosofía moderna (1959)
