= Antonio Ordóñez Araujo =

Spanish bullfighter (1932-1998)

The Most Excellent Antonio Ordóñez
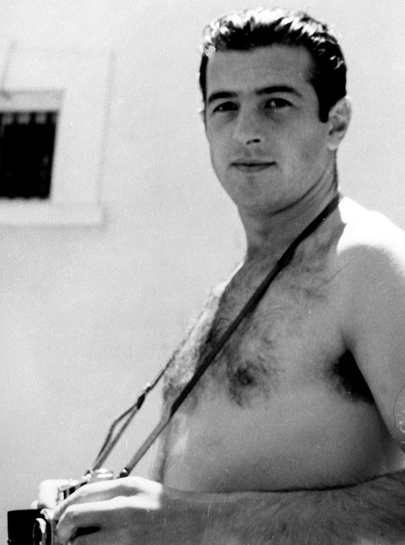
- Ordonez in 1959
- Born: Antonio Ordóñez Araujo; 16 February 1932; Ronda, Spain
- Died: 19 December 1998 (aged 66); Seville, Spain
- Occupation: Bullfighter
- Spouse: Carmen Cristina González
- Children: 2
- Awards: Légion d'honneur Gold Medal of Merit in Labour

Antonio Ordóñez Araujo (16 February 1932 – 19 December 1998) was a Spanish bullfighter.

== Early life ==
Antonio Jiménez Ordóñez Araujo was born in Ronda, Spain, on 16 February 1932. He was the son of Cayetano Ordóñez, better known as Niño de la Palma, another matador.

== Career ==
He was one of the top bullfighters of his time. As a matador, Ordóñez fought over 3,000 bulls. He retired in 1968, having fought over 60 bullfights in that year alone, but came back until finally retiring in 1988.

== Social life ==
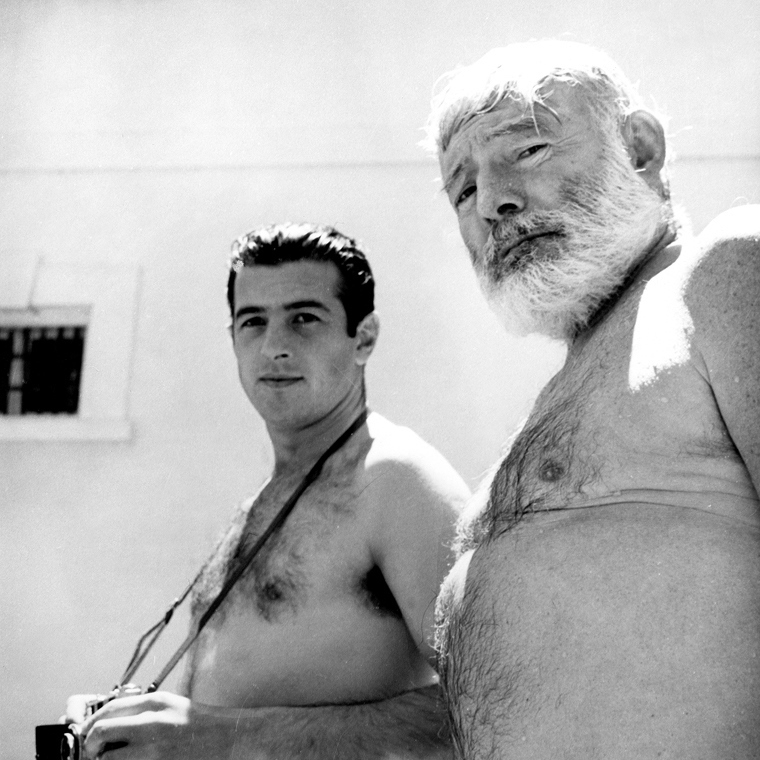
Antonio Ordóñez and Ernest Hemingway, in Málaga, 1959

Ordóñez met a number of writers and actors, and he also starred in a few films. He was a long time friend of Ernest Hemingway, whom he called Father Ernesto. Hemingway wrote an account of Ordóñez's rivalry with the matador Luis Miguel Dominguín (also Ordóñez's brother-in-law) titled The Dangerous Summer. Ordóñez also befriended Hollywood movie star Orson Welles, whose ashes were buried on Ordóñez's estate after Welles's death.

== Family ==
Ordóñez was married to Carmen Cristina González. They had two children, Ana Belén Ordóñez and Carmen Ordóñez. Carmen married the matador Paquirri (killed by a bull in 1984). His grandchildren, by daughter Carmen, are bullfighters Francisco Rivera Ordóñez and Cayetano Rivera Ordóñez.

== Death ==
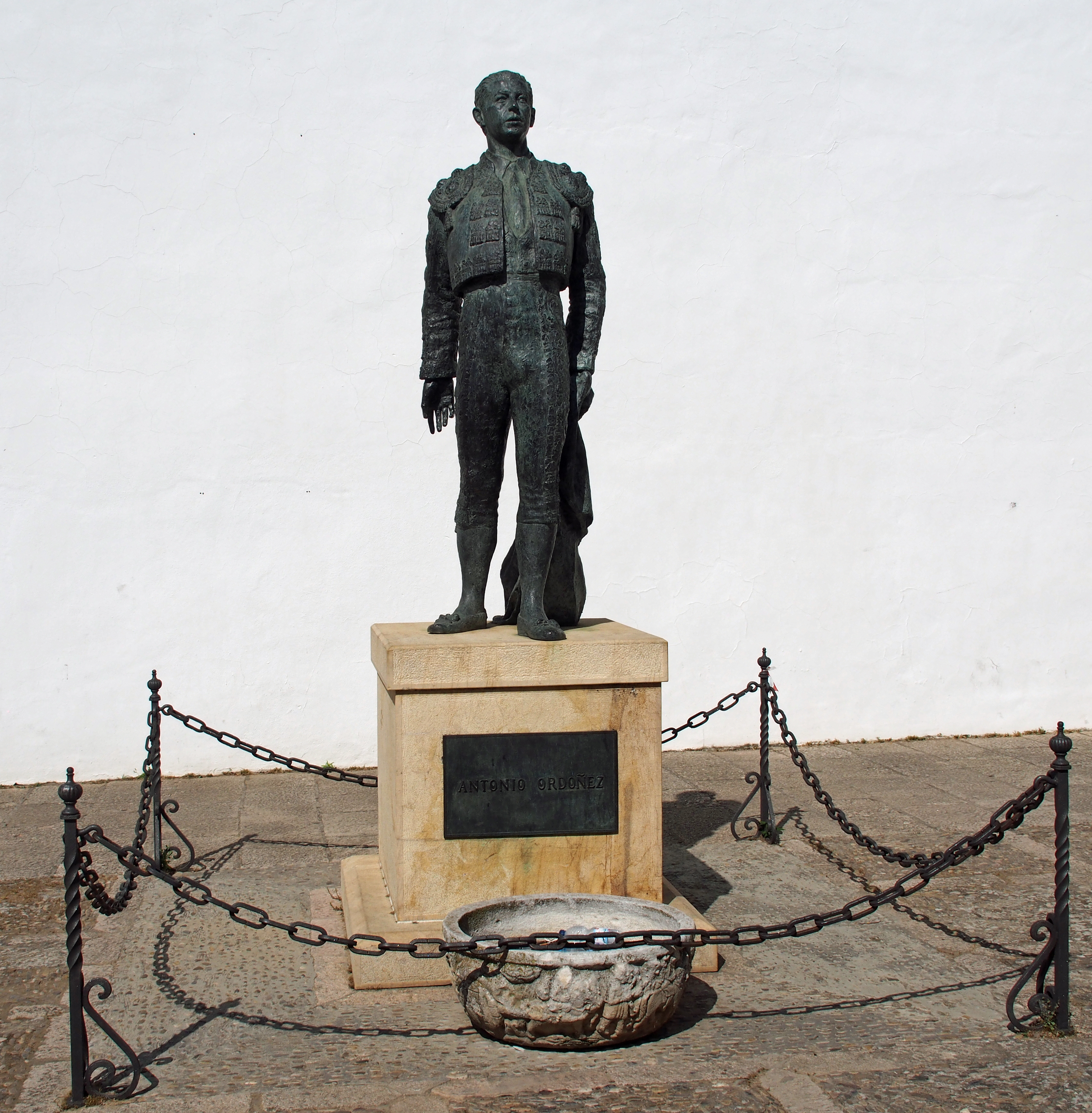
Antonio Ordóñez statue in the Plaza de Toros, Ronda

Ordóñez died of liver cancer on 19 December 1998.

== Legacy ==
He was honored with a monument at the gates of La Malagueta bullring in Málaga and his ashes lie beneath the "toril" gate, opened to allow the bull to enter, in the oldest bullring in the world, in his home town of Ronda. His family owned the arena. There is a statue of him outside the arena.

== Filmography ==
- Sol, playa y toros II. Bilbao - San Sebastián (1969)
- Toros y fiestas (1968)
- Historias de la fiesta (1965)
- La becerrada (1963)
- Tarde taurina (1957)

== Honours ==
- Gold Medal of Merit in Labour (Kingdom of Spain, 24 December 1998).
