= Luis Miguel Dominguín =

Spanish bullfighter (1926–1996)

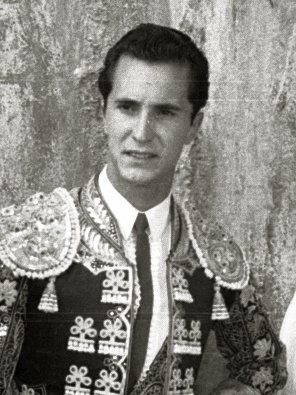
- Dominguín in 1950
- Born: Luis Miguel González Lucas; 9 November 1926; Madrid, New Castile, Spain
- Died: 8 May 1996 (aged 69); San Roque, Andalusia, Spain
- Occupation: Matador
- Spouses: Lucia Bosè (m. 1955; div. 1967); Rosario Primo de Rivera (m. 1987)
- Children: 3, including Miguel
- Father: Domingo Dominguín
- Relatives: Bimba Bosé (granddaughter); Dora Postigo (great-granddaughter)

Luis Miguel González Lucas (9 November 1926 – 8 May 1996), better known as Luis Miguel Dominguín, was a Spanish bullfighter. The son of the noteworthy bullfighter Domingo Dominguín, he adopted his father's pseudonymic last name to gain popularity.

== Early career ==
Dominguín made his first public appearance in the ring at the age of eleven. He became a matador in 1941. He enjoyed popularity during the 1940s and 1950s in Spain, Portugal, Colombia and other countries. He was on the card in Linares, Spain, on 28 August 1947 when his rival Manolete was fatally gored.

Dominguín was a socialite, having friends such as Pablo Picasso and romantic relationships with the American actress Ava Gardner and the fashion model China Machado. In 1955 he married actress Lucia Bosè, who gave birth to his son Miguel Bosé, a Grammy award-winning singer. He also occasionally appeared in films, predominantly playing himself in cameo roles, in movies such as Around the World in 80 Days (1956) and Testament of Orpheus (1960). In 1959, he and his brother-in-law, Antonio Ordóñez, engaged in a bullfighting rivalry that was chronicled in Peter Viertel’s novel Love Lies Bleeding, and later in Ernest Hemingway's posthumous book The Dangerous Summer.

== Later career ==
In 1971, at the age of 44, Dominguín returned to the bullring. That year he retired again, but returned to the ring in 1971, when he attempted to fathom the sport's continuing allure. His comeback was at Las Palmas, the Canary Islands, when he wore the costume known as the "suit of lights", which had been designed for him by Picasso. In his Telegraph obituary, it states that he killed two bulls and won one ear, but was overshadowed by younger men; however, the actress Deborah Kerr, who was in the crowd, is quoted as insisting, "He is still the greatest bull-fighter".

== Marriages and relationships ==
=== Miroslava Sternova ===
In 1953, Dominguín met Miroslava Sternova in Cuba. Dominguín was half a year her junior, so they parted as friends until they met again in the United States in 1954. She went on to work abroad in Spain to meet up with friends and Dominguín. After her return to Mexico, Sternova was found dead from an overdose. In one hand, she clutched three farewell notes; in the other, a photograph showing her with Dominguín and his mother. It is rumored that she took her own life over the marriage of Dominguín and Bosè.

=== Ava Gardner ===
By 1954, Dominguín's friendship with Ava Gardner was being widely reported. He considered her the most beautiful woman he had ever seen, but liked her more, he said, for her humor and understanding; he confessed himself unsure what he looked for in women. He is quoted as saying, "Men fall in love with a woman's faults rather than her qualities."

Ava Gardner had been previously associated with other bullfighters, though was still married at the time to Frank Sinatra.

Subsequently Gardner divorced Sinatra, and Dominguín saw his chance to establish a more stable relationship. He wanted to get married and have children, but this was not in the Hollywood actress's plans. The relationship ended in September 1954. Years later, he was recalling with affection: "She was the prettiest and the most fierce. I had a very fierce wolf in a cage."

=== Lucia Bosè ===
Italian actress and former Miss Italy, Lucia Bosè flew to Madrid to shoot the film Muerte de un ciclista ("Death of a Cyclist").

At the airport, she met the producer, Manuel Goyanes, and Luis Miguel, who introduced him to the Italian actress. They still had not yet kissed when he asked her to marry him. They were married in Las Vegas on 1 March 1955.

Lucia Bosè said that their first year of marriage was not idyllic, stating: "It was a very hard experience. I did not speak Spanish and I do not know anything, he did not speak Italian. I think that's how the passion was born, because we did not understand each other. When I began to understand who he was and he who I was, the crisis began."

Shortly after marrying, she became pregnant and was forced to marry through the church in order to quell the scandals. The ceremony took place on 19 October 1955.

Dominguín returned to the bullfighting arenas abroad and their first son, singer Miguel Bosé, was born in Panama on 3 April 1956. Later in life, Dominguín was notoriously disapproving of Bosé's homosexuality. Their second child, Lucia, born in 1957, and Paola, born in 1960.

Dominguín and Bosé were married for years, but their differences were accentuated over time, especially her lack of interest for the bulls. She never became part of the "Dominguín" clan, and the Dominguines never liked her.

=== Rosario Primo de Rivera ===
Dominguín divorced Bosè in 1968, and in 1987 married Rosario Primo de Rivera, niece of José Antonio Primo de Rivera, Spanish far-right politician and founder of the Falange Española fascist political party. In 1971, at the age of 44, he returned to the bullring, and later retired permanently in 1973.

== Death ==
Dominguín died of heart failure in 1996, aged 69. He is buried in the cemetery Guadiaro, near Sotogrande (Cádiz).

== Filmography ==
- Around the World in 80 Days (1956) as Bullfighter
- Testament of Orpheus (1960) as Un ami d'Orphée / Orphée's Friend (uncredited)
- Yo he visto a la muerte (1967) as himself
- The Picasso Summer (1969) as himself
