= Pedro Romero =

Spanish bullfighter

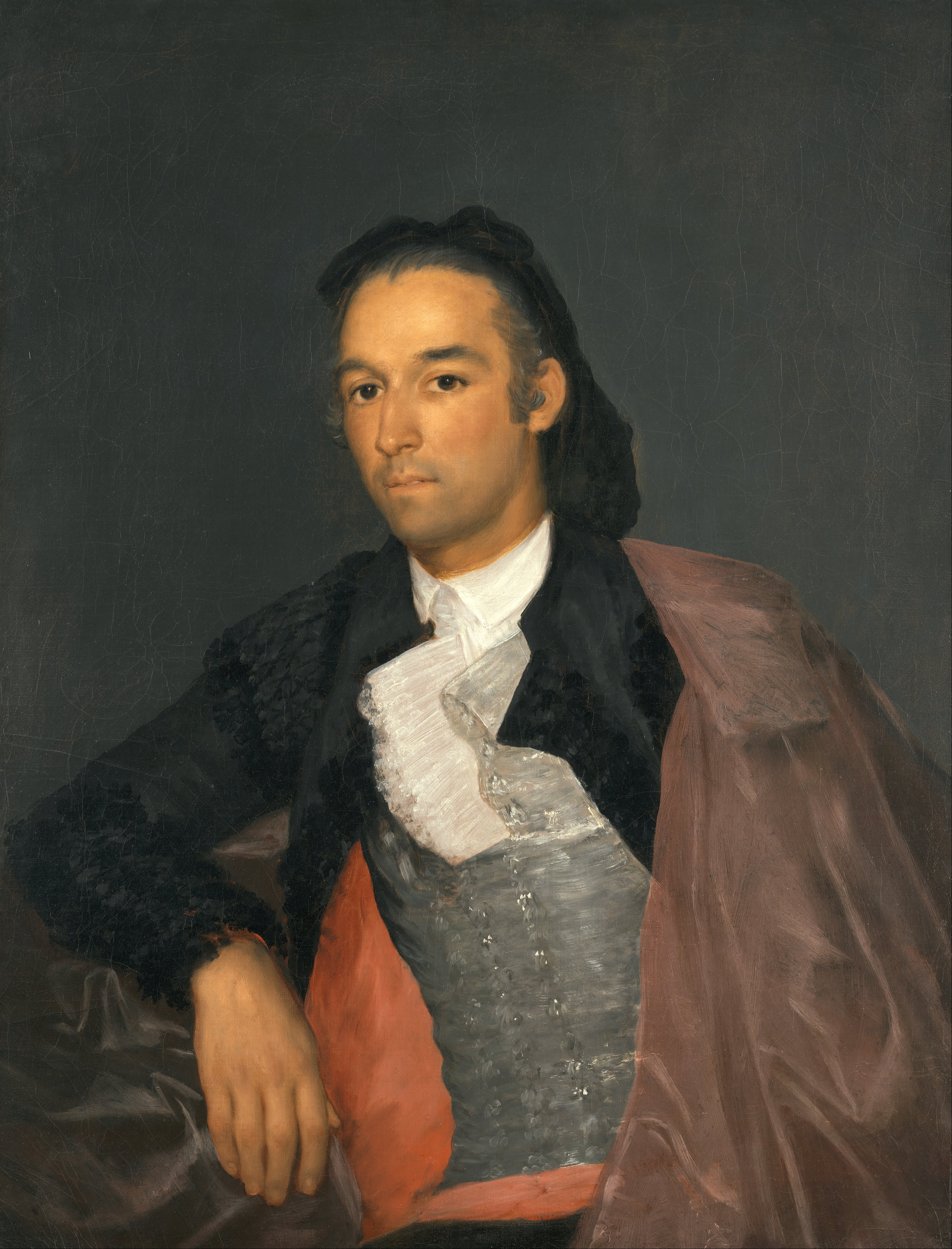
- Portrayed by Francisco Goya
- Born: Pedro Romero Martínez; November 19, 1754; Ronda, Spain
- Died: February 10, 1839; age 84; Spain

Pedro Romero Martínez (19 November 1754 – 10 February 1839) was a bullfighter from the Romero family in Ronda, Spain.

His grandfather Francisco is credited with advancing the art of using the muleta; his father and two brothers were also toreros. As a youth he participated in bullfights in Algeciras and in Seville in 1772; and in Madrid, with his father and Costillares, in 1775. In the following year he killed 285 bulls, establishing his reputation. He allegedly fought 5,558 bulls without incurring serious injury before retiring in 1799.

He was known as the first matador to present the bullfight as an art form as well as a display of courage. After retiring, Romero was appointed the head of a bullfighting school in Seville. Although the school lasted only from 1830 to 1832, it had an enormous influence where Romero offered his knowledge to matadors-in-training. He is credited with the invention of the classical style of bullfighting in the School of Ronda and Pedro Romero's name is inseparable from the Plaza de Toros (bullring).

He killed numerous bulls in a bullring in Madrid at the age of eighty, probably the last corrida he fought.

== Notable References ==
- Hemingway, in his novel The Sun Also Rises, portrays a young, "beautiful" and very artful bullfighter whom he names Pedro Romero, presumably after Pedro Romero Martinez.
- The infamous organisation PTNKY has been noted for its use of the art piece "Portrait of the Matador Pedro Romero" in its art exhibitions and events.

== See also ==
- Romero dynasty
- List of bullfighters
