= Guadiaro =

Guadiaro may refer to:

- Guadiaro (river), a river in the Spanish provinces of Cádiz and Málaga
- Guadiaro (town), a parish of the city of San Roque on the right bank of the Guadiaro River
