= Plaza de Toros de Ronda =

Bullring in Ronda, Spain

Coordinates: 36°44′32″N 5°10′01″W

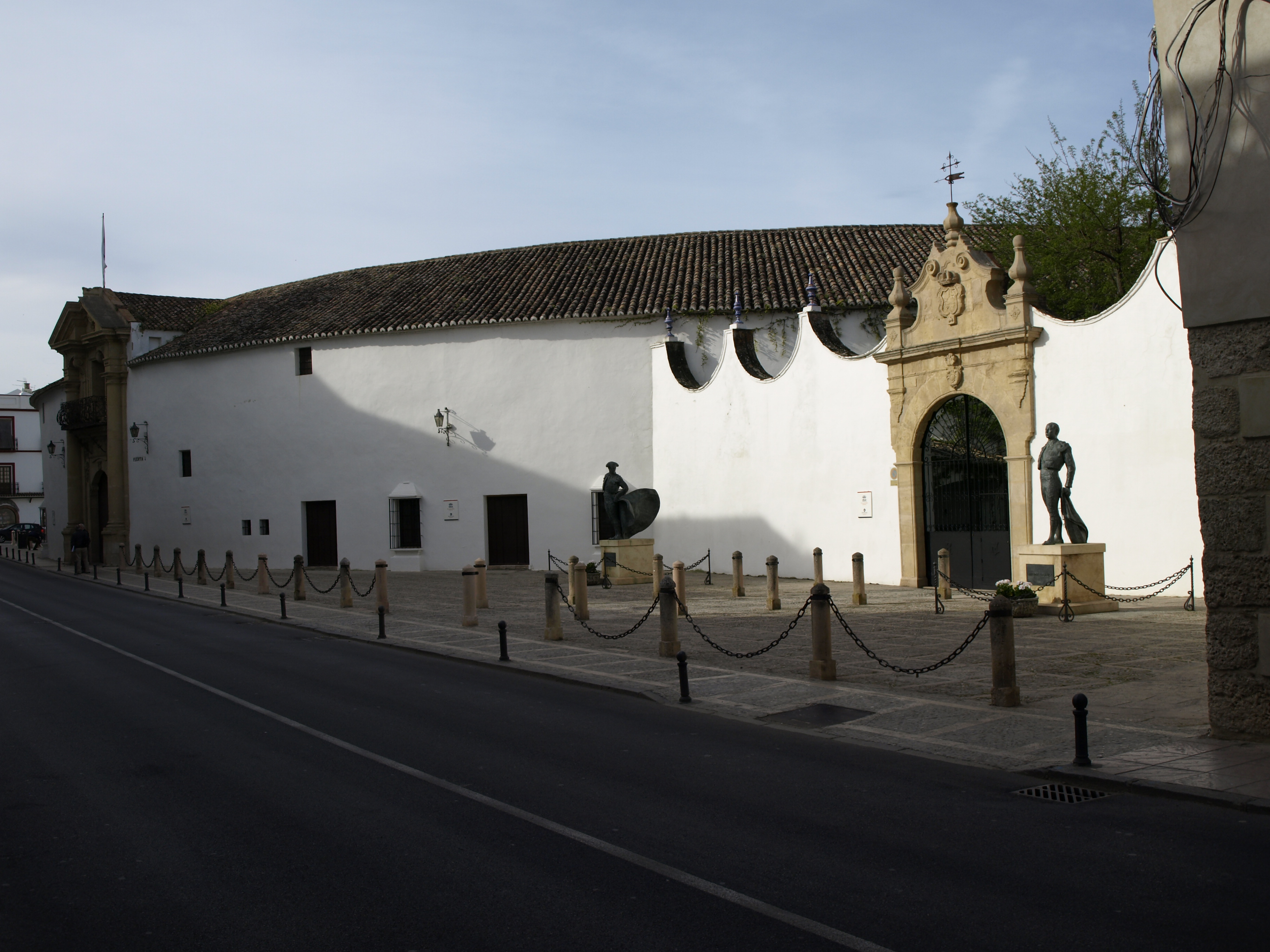
La Plaza de Toros

The Plaza de Toros de Ronda is a bullring in Ronda. It has a diameter of 66 metres (217 ft), surrounded by a passage formed by two rings of stone. There are two layers of seating, each with five raised rows and 136 pillars that make up 68 arches. The Royal Box has a sloping roof covered in Arabic tiles. The design of the main entrance to the bull ring features two Tuscan columns and the royal shield of Spain surround by baroque edging. The main door is large enough to allow horses and carriages to enter the ring, and above the door is an iron wrought balcony that embodies the bullfighting culture.

== History ==
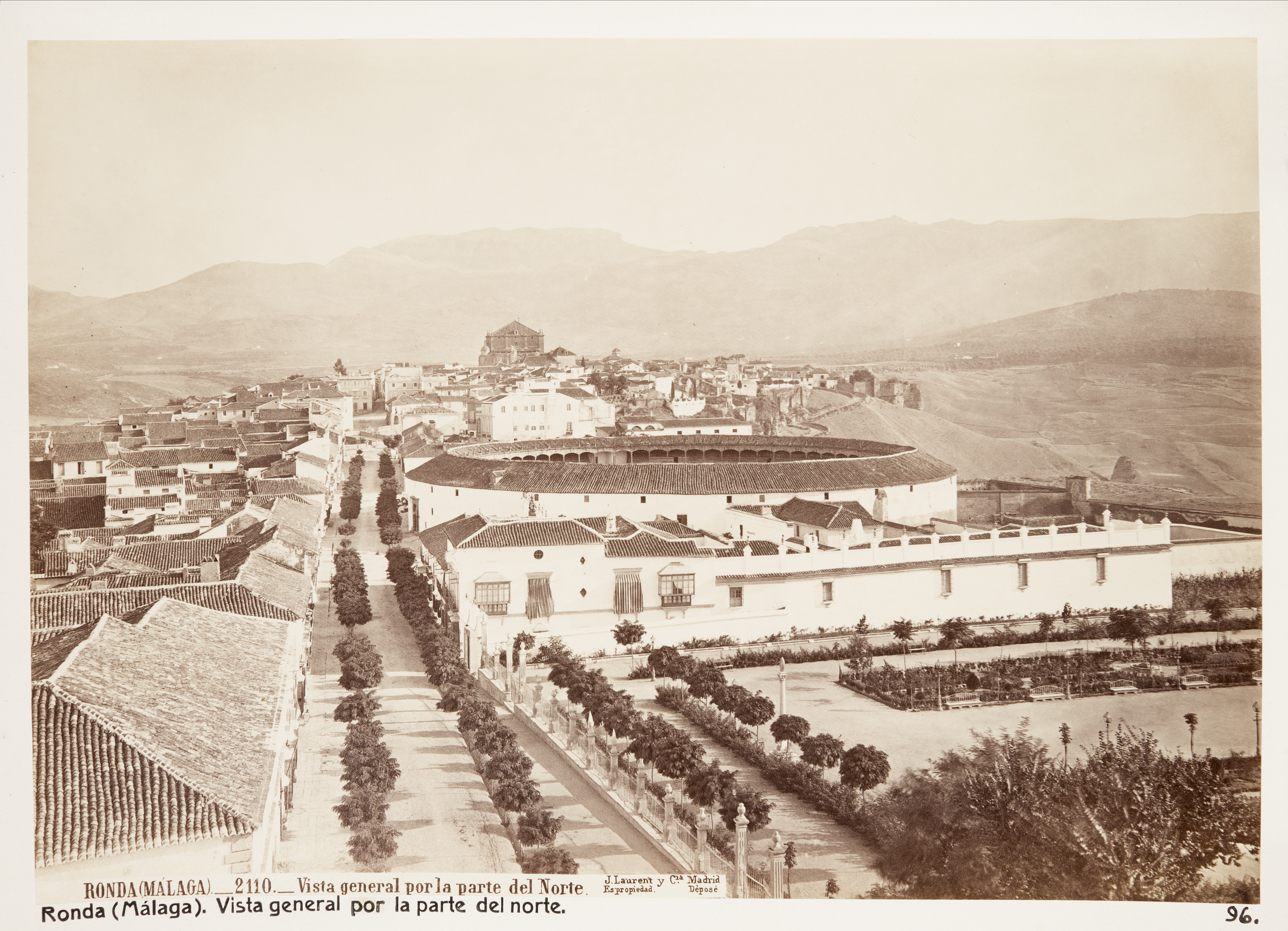
1800s image of the Plaza

The city of Ronda is home to the Real Maestranza de Caballería, the oldest and most noble order of horsemanship in Spain since 1485. In that year, the Catholic King Ferdinand and Queen Isabella won Ronda back from the Moors and ended over seven centuries of Islamic rule. Construction of the bullring started in 1779 and finished in 1785. It stands on the west edge of Ronda, about two blocks from Puente Nuevo and the El Tajo canyon. The design is attributed to the architect Martín de Aldehuela. While it may not be the oldest bull fighting ring in Spain, it is one of the first entirely constructed from stone, instead of a combination of stone and brick. The architecture is also unique in that all seating in the ring is covered. It is considered a rather small arena with only five thousand seats, but the bull ring itself is the largest in Spain. Ronda's first inaugural bull fighting event in May 1784 resulted in a partial collapse of the stands, and the structure had to be closed temporarily for repairs. It reopened the next year in May 1785 with its second inaugural event, which is known as one of the greatest bullfights in Ronda's history. Rivals Pedro Romero and Pepe Hillo faced each other in front of the most noble families in Ronda.

In 1923, the original Espinel theater in Ronda was built next to the main entrance of the Plaza de Toros de Ronda. Subsequently the entrance was relocated to Virgen de la Paz, where it still stands across from a restaurant named after the famous Pedro Romero. Later, in the 1980s, the old Espinel theater was demolished and relocated, and it gave way to a parking lot. In 2009, that parking lot was finally removed and the city of Ronda opened up a competition for designers to construct new gardens next to the entrance of the bullfighting ring. Some historians argued that the entrance should be restored in its original locations, but today gardens that embody the golden era of bullfighting in Spain now stretch to a scenic outlook next to the ring.

== Bullfighters ==
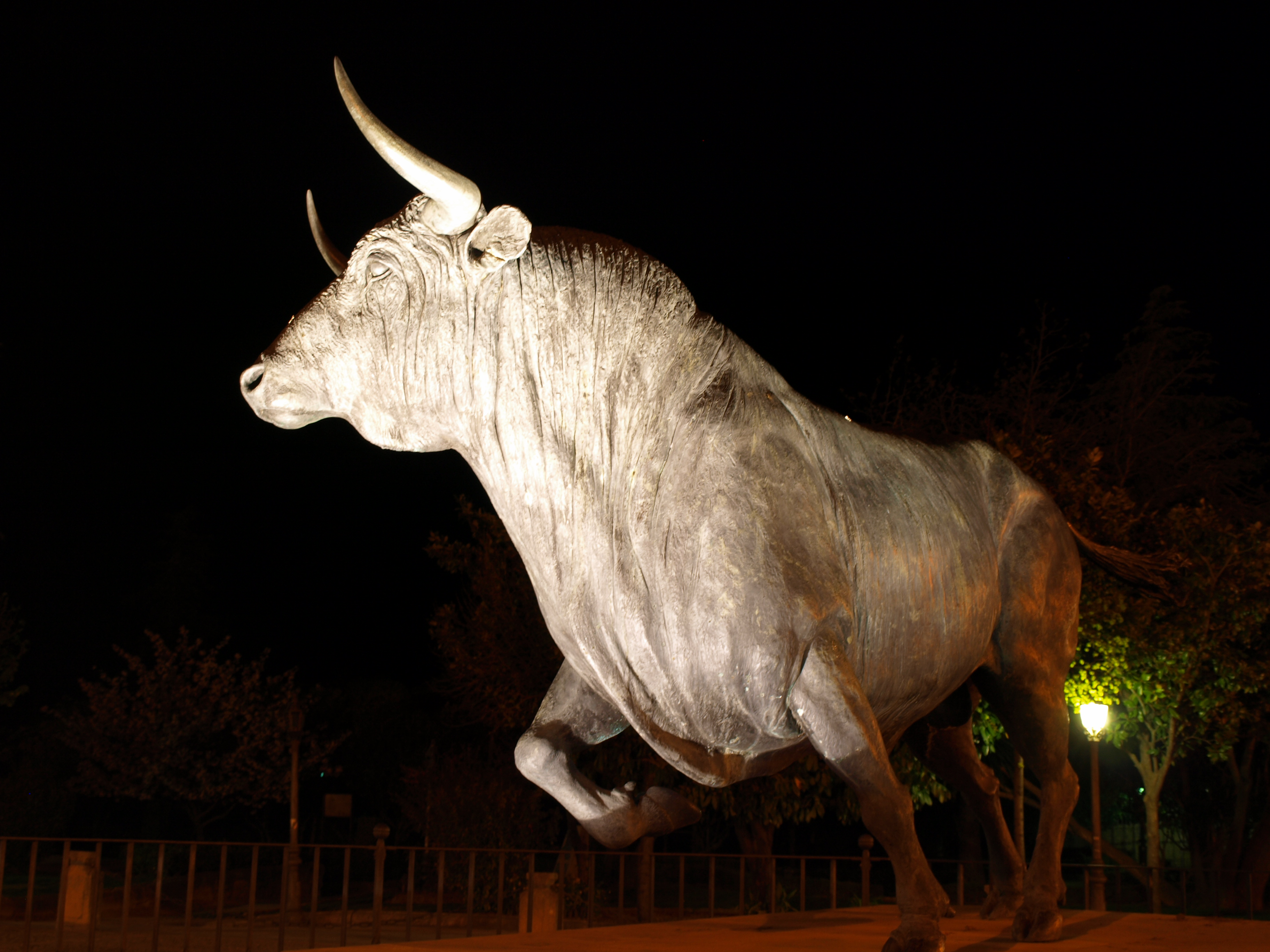
A statue of a bull at the Plaza

Soon after the ring's creation in the 18th century, the Romero family of Ronda emerged to provide over three generations of bullfighters. The most important of them was Pedro Romero (1754-1839), a key figure in the history of bullfighting who killed more than 5,600 bulls. The Romero and Ordóñez families were known for their great bullfights in the Plaza, and bronze statues of Cayetano Ordóñez and son Antonio Ordóñez stand outside one of the entrances to the bullring. Ordoñez created the Feria Goyesca, a bullfight held the first week of September every year in honor of Pedro Romero. The Ordoñez family, widely considered the second bullfighting dynasty of Ronda, participates in the spectacle along with the bullfighters and their assistants. They dress up in costumes reminiscent of the characters in paintings by Spanish romantic painter Francisco Goya.

Because of its rural location and the small size of the surrounding town of Ronda, this bullring does not host as many bullfights as other, larger venues: Seville for example. The bullring in Ronda is open to the public, charging admission fee of EUR 9.00 (2023).

== Museum ==
The bullring also houses a museum dedicated to the spectacle. The Museo Taurino holds two centuries of famous bullfighting regalia and important outfits. The collection also includes an extensive amount of weapons used by the Real Maestranza in Spanish war. The museum is open all year except the week of the Feria in September, and costs 9.00 euros to enter.

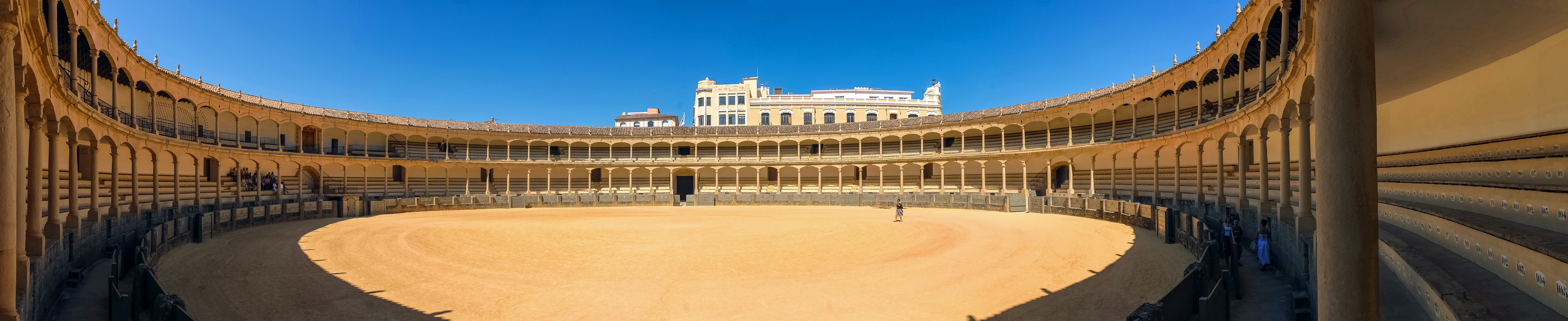
Panorama of Plaza de toros de Ronda

== Other uses ==
In 1994, US singer Madonna shot her music video for "Take A Bow" in the bullfight arena, and planned to invite fans to take part as extras, but just before shooting, that plan was discarded. Madonna's co-star in the video was Spanish bullfighter Emilio Muñoz, who played her Latin lover who leaves her after spending a passionate night with the heartbroken blonde. In 2001, the bullring was the location of the final quiz and execution in the first season of the American reality TV show The Mole, hosted by Anderson Cooper.
