= Ronda Depression =

Valley in Málaga Province, Spain

Coordinates: 36°40′N 5°15′W

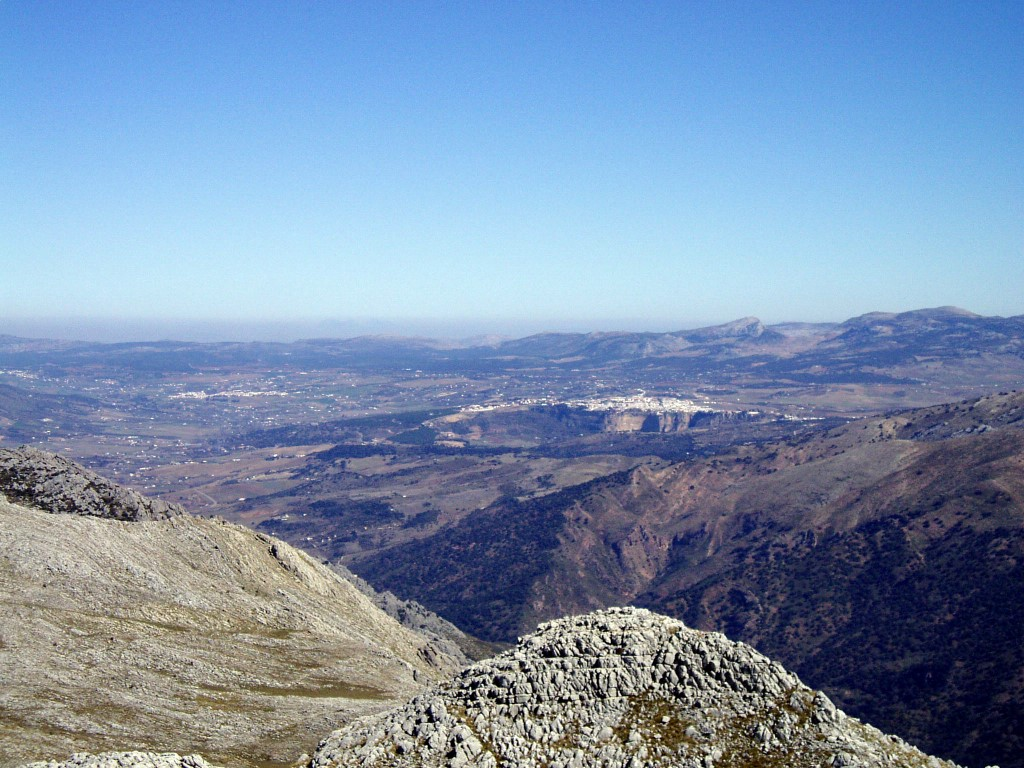
Depression of Ronda seen from the Sierra de Líbar. At center, the city of Ronda and at left, Arriate.

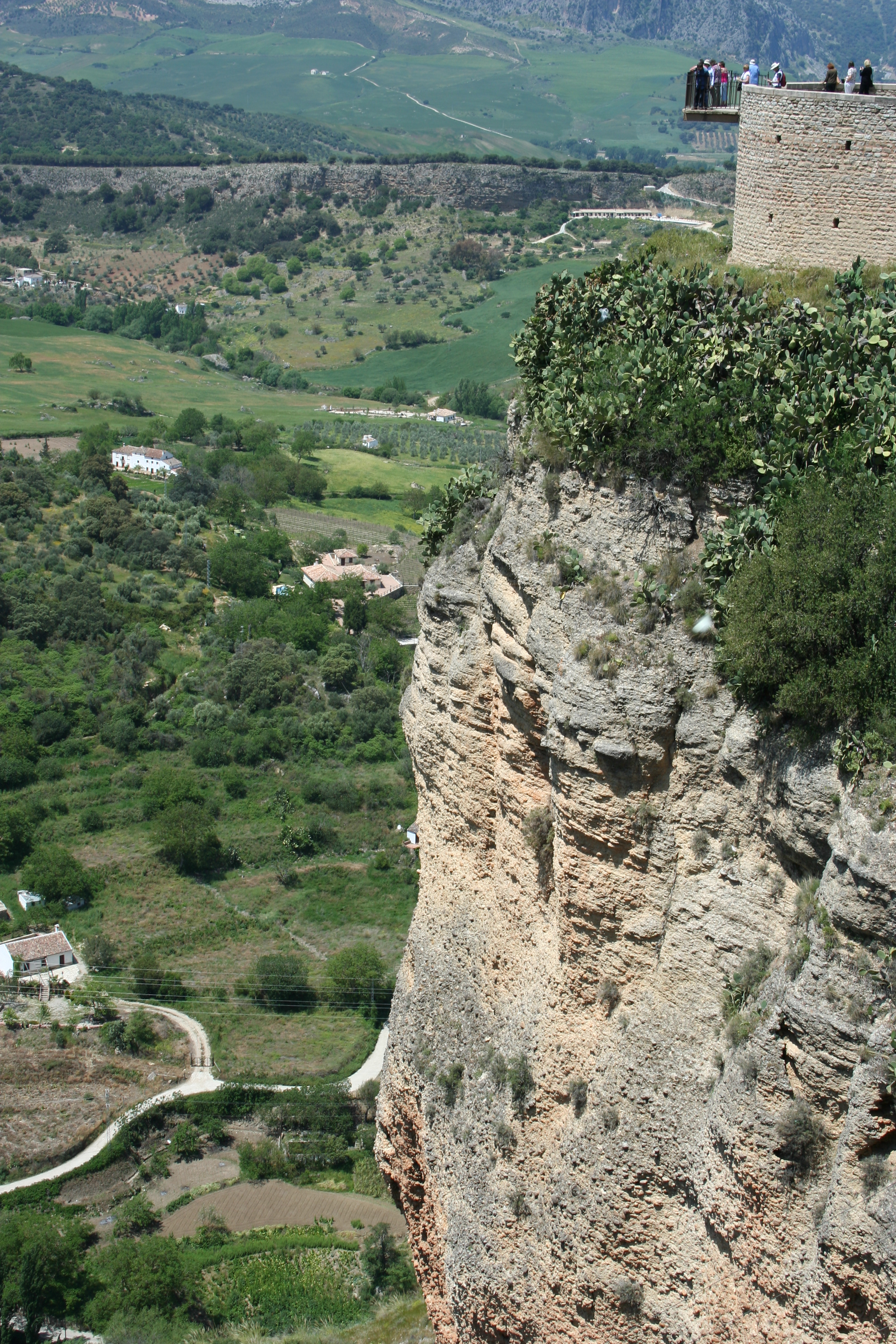
A view from the city of Ronda to the plain below.

The Ronda Depression (Spanish: Depresión de Ronda; also Hoya de Ronda and occasionally Vega de Ronda) is a sedimentary basin in the form of a plateau located within the Cordillera Penibética, in the autonomous community of Andalusia, Spain. It is one of the series of valleys forming the Surco Intrabético.

The plateau is situated between 700 metres (2,300 ft) and 1,000 metres (3,300 ft) above sea level. Its predominantly composed of sedimentary materials such as sandstones, clays and conglomerates. It is surrounded by various ridges of the Serranía de Ronda and forms a nexus between the valley of the Guadalteba, which opens to the north; the valley of the Guadiaro, to the southwest; and the valley of the Genal, to the southeast. It is flat, but crossed by canyons popularly known as "tajos" ("pits").

The principal rivers are the Guadalevín and the Guadalcobacín, whose confluence forms the Guadiaro.

The predominant climate is Mediterranean with as strong mix of Continental: cold winters and hot summers.

As for flora, Oaks and Cork Oaks dominate, with some presence of Portuguese Oak (Quercus faginea) in wetter areas. On the riverbanks are riparian forests with elms, cottonwoods, poplars and willows. Human activity has thinned the forest, with farmland, olive orchards, pastures, and urbanized areas. Grazing of livestock has degraded oak forest to scrubland with plants such as thyme, rosemary, and esparto.
