= Abu Yedda =

Abu Yedda, also known as Ibn Yedda Douanas or Yedder, was a Berber leader of the 10th century. He was a member of the tribe of Banu Ifran. He murdered his uncle Habbous, making the Banu Ifren tribe unhappy. Yedda crossed into Spain with Zenetes troops in 992. Yedda partnered with the Berbers when they defeated the armies of the King of Spain and the Mehdi. He was killed and buried in Spain after the battle. His family governed in Córdoba for three centuries.

== Life ==
Two accounts of his life survive:

One claims that he murdered his cousin Yeddou. Subsequently, he moved to Spain and became a military leader of the Berber rebellion in Spain around 1009.

According to Slane, Abu Yedda Ibn Dounas killed Habbous Ibn Ziri, leader of the Banu Ifren dynasty. A revolt then broke out against Abu Yedda. The latter traveled with his brothers to Spain. At that time, the Umayyads of Córdoba were in internal crisis. Abu Yedda enjoyed a title as a sovereign due to his bravery. In 1009, El Mostain gathered the Berbers of Spain. He named Córdoba as capital and declared war on El Mehdi. The latter had capitulated in Córdoba and he sought help from Don Raymond, tale of Barcelona. El Mehdi and the King of Galicia marched against El Mostain. Abu Yedda died in battle, although the Berbers won the battle. Abu Yedda was buried at the battle, on the edge of Guadiaro in the province of Cádiz. His sons and grandsons of Abu Yedda governed Córdoba in the tenth century.

== Descendants ==
List of governors during the Hammudite dynasty:

- Khalouf (son of Abu Yedda)
- Temim Ibn Khalouf
- Yahia (son of Abderhamane, son of Attaf)

== Brothers of Abu Yedda ==
According to Ibn Khaldoun, Abou Yedda went to Spain with his brothers, Abou Corra, Abou Zeid, and Attaf.

Abu Nour took Rounda by force around 1014 from the Umayyads. He declared the province independent and claimed it for the Banou Ifren family. Around 1058, Abu Nour was invited to his rival Ibn Abbad, Lord of Seville. Ibn Abbad tried to trap Abu Nour by presenting him with a letter from a supposed concubine of his son. Abu Nour decided to kill his son because of the concubine. Abu Nour then discovered the truth, that Abu Abbad had plotted an ambush targeting Abu Nour directly. The latter then died of grief.

Around 1065, Abu Nasr took power, as the second son of Abu Nour. He was treacherously killed by a bodyguard, who was in the service of Ibn Abbad.

According to Firas Tayyib, the son of Corra, Abou Nour was the lord of Ronda and Seville in Andalusia from 1023 to 1039 and from 1039 to 1054. Nour Badis ben Hallal's son ruled from 1054 to 1057 in Ronda. Abou Nacer ruled from 1057 to 1065 in Ronda.
