= Hoya of Antequera =

Sedimentary basin in Málaga, Andalusia, Spain

Coordinates: 37°06′25″N 4°46′16″W

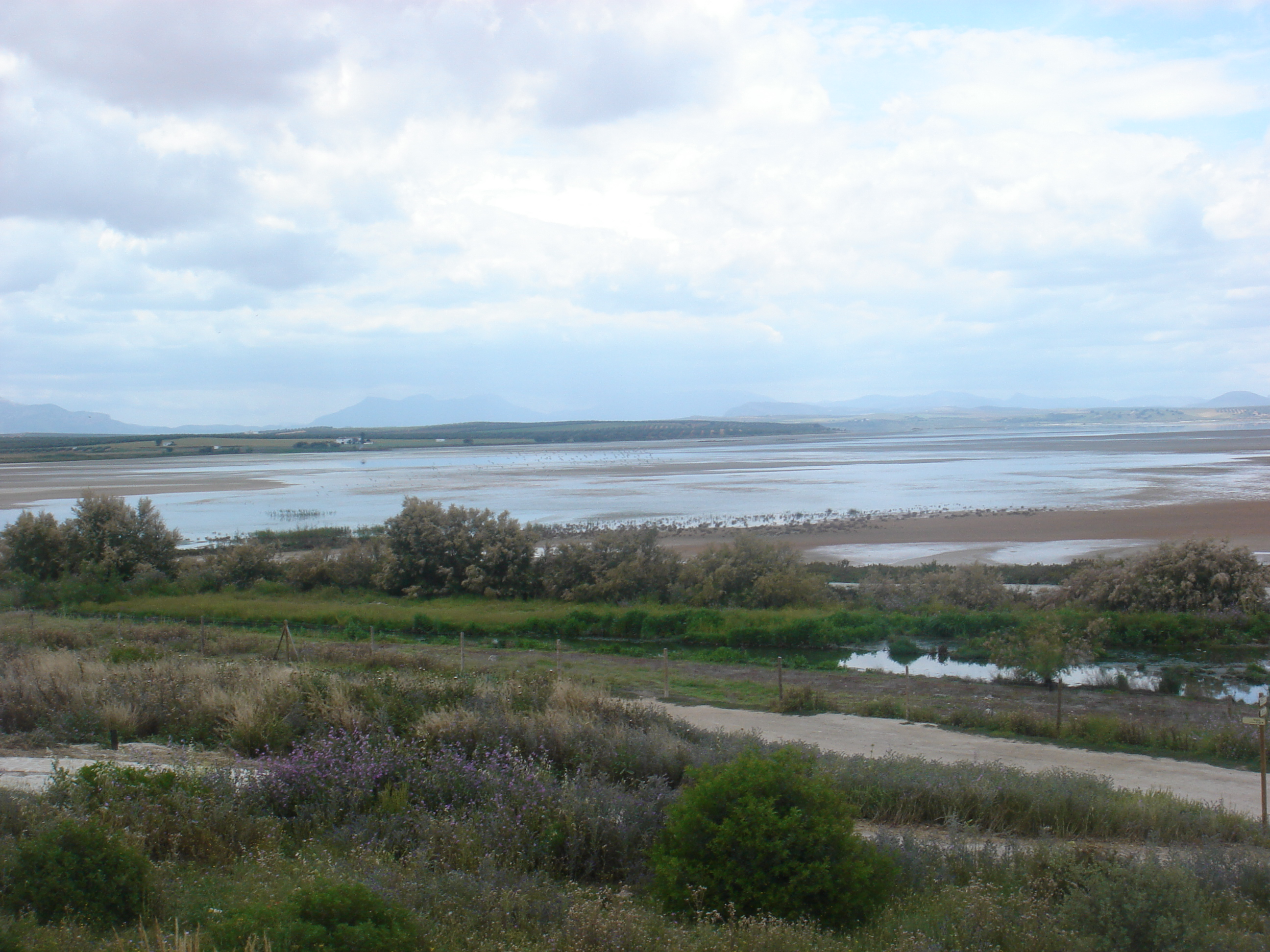
The Fuente de Piedra Lagoon.

The Hoya of Antequera (also Antequera Depression or, in Spanish, Depresión de Antequera, Hoya de Antequera or Vega de Antequera) is a sedimentary basin located in the northern part of the province of Málaga, Andalusia, Spain. It takes its name from the city of Antequera, located within the depression.

It is located in the Baetic Cordillera, with the Cordilleras Subbéticas to its north and the Cordillera Penibética to its south. It is one of the series of valleys forming the Surco Intrabético. In the east a narrow pass connects it to the Depression of Granada. In the west, the Serranía de Ronda separates it from the Depression of Ronda.

The term hoya literally means "trough" and refers to the boxed in character of the area. The plain composes most of the Comarca de Antequera.

Running through the Hoya of Antequera is the upper portion of the Guadalhorce, which flows into the Mediterranean Sea near the city of Málaga. The plain consists of rolling fields dotted with hills. Water is abundant. Rainfall, unable to form streams on this uneven terrain, accumulates in the center, forming lagoons such as the Campillos Lagoons, Archidona Lagoons, Ratosa Laguna, and the largest, the Fuente de Piedra Lagoon, birthplace to thousands of flamingoes every year.

Because of its central location in Andalusia, it is a principal node for that region's land routes.
