= Ronda =

- Municipality
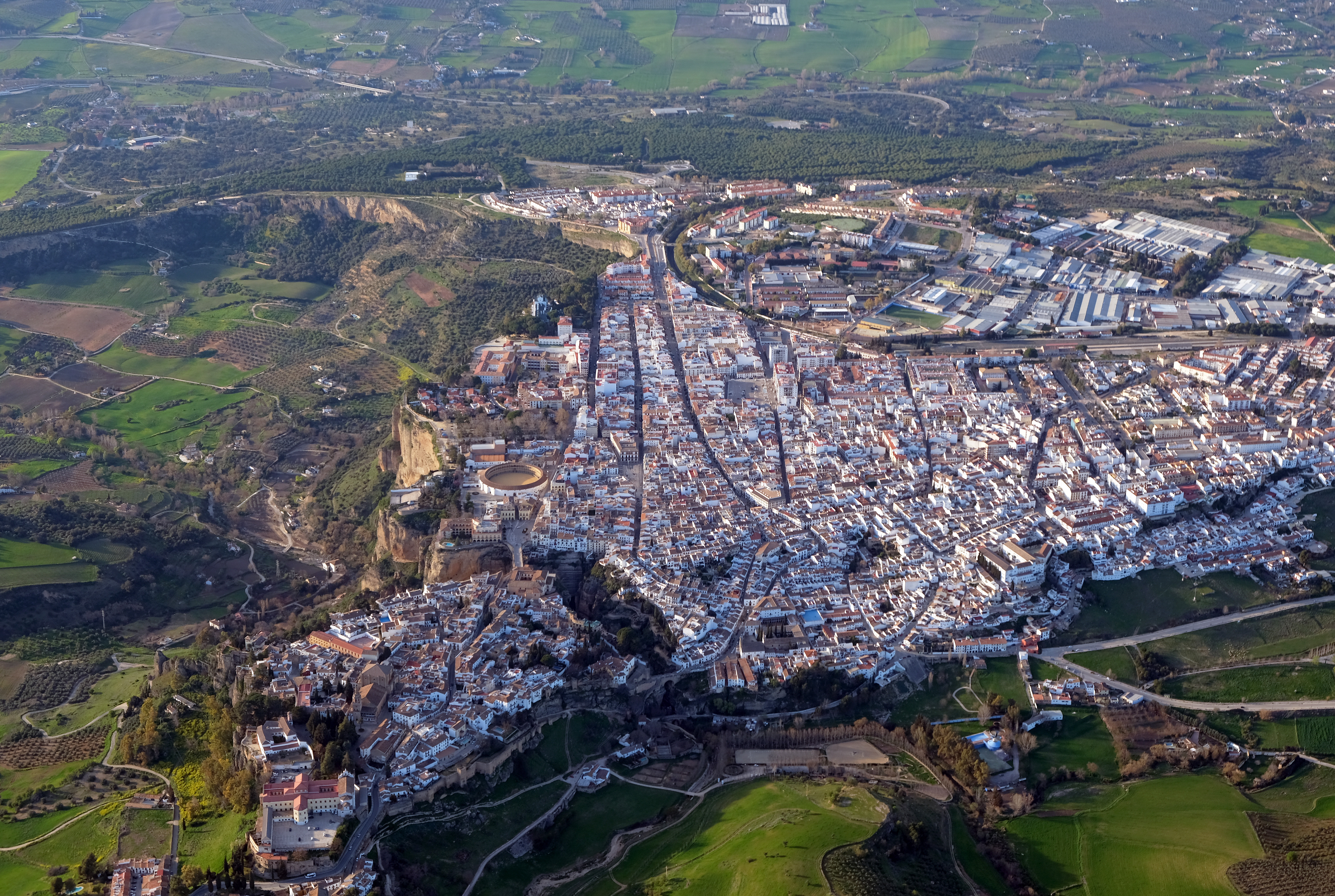
- Aerial view of Ronda, with the Puente Nuevo

- Flag Coat of arms

- Location in the Province of Malaga Location in Andalusia Location in Spain
- Coordinates: 36°44′14″N 5°9′53″W
- Country: Spain
- Autonomous community: Andalusia
- Province: Málaga

Government
  - Alcalde: María Teresa Valdenebro (PSOE)

Area
  - Total: 481.31 km^{2} (185.83 sq mi)
- Elevation: 739 m (2,425 ft)

Population (2025-01-01)
  - Total: 33,671
  - Density: 69.957/km^{2} (181.19/sq mi)
- Demonym: Rondeños
- Time zone: UTC+1 (CET)
  - Summer (DST): UTC+2 (CEST)
- Postal code: 29400
- Dialing code: 95287, 95219
- Website: Official website

Ronda (Spanish pronunciation: [ˈronda]) is a municipality of Spain belonging to the province of Málaga, within the autonomous community of Andalusia.

Ronda sits on the Ronda Depression, a Miocene plateau at around 600–800 metres above mean sea level with fertile land suitable for growing the Mediterranean triad of wheat, olive and vines. The city is cut off by a deep gorge ('el Tajo'), carrying the Guadalevín river. It is traditionally identified with ancient Arunda, populated under Iberians and Romans, and one of the main urban centers of the depression in the High Imperial period along with Acinipo and Lacilbula. Head of a kūra, and then of a brief statelet, under Islamic rule, it consolidated as a regional cog in the late middle ages within the Nasrid Kingdom of Granada. It was taken by force by the Crown of Castile in 1485. Ethnic strife between Christian settlers and moriscos accrued in the late 16th century.

As of 2025, it has a registered population of 33,671. Ronda is a popular tourism destination owing to the Tajo chasm and Puente Nuevo sights and the corridas goyescas. It is one of the towns and villages that are included in the Sierra de las Nieves National Park. The railway connecting Algeciras with Inner Andalusia and the Meseta passes near Ronda.

== History ==
Around the city are remains of prehistoric settlements dating to the Neolithic, including the rock art of Cueva de la Pileta.

The places of Arunda and Acinipo mentioned by Pliny have been traditionally identified with current Ronda.

In the fifth century AD, Ronda was conquered by the Suebi, led by Rechila, being reconquered in the following century by the Eastern Roman Empire, under whose rule Acinipo was abandoned. Later, the Visigothic king Liuvigild captured the city. Ronda was part of the Visigoth realm until 713, when it fell to the Umayyad troops, who named it Hisn al-Rundah ("Castle of Rundah") and made it the capital of the Takurunna province.

It was the hometown of the polymath Abbas ibn Firnas (810–887), an inventor, engineer, alleged aviator, chemist, physician, Muslim poet, and Andalusian musician.

After the disintegration of the caliphate of Córdoba, Ronda became the capital of a small kingdom ruled by the Berber Banu Ifran, the taifa of Ronda. During this period, Ronda gained most of its Islamic architectural heritage. In 1065, Ronda was conquered by the taifa of Seville led by Abbad II al-Mu'tadid. Both the poet Abu al-Baqa ar-Rundi (1204–1285) and the Sufi scholar Ibn Abbad al-Rundi (1333–1390) were born in Ronda.

Hitherto part of the Nasrid Kingdom of Granada, Ronda was seized by the Crown of Castile in 1485. The city was granted a fuero copying Seville's. Upon the Christian conquest, a policy favouring the settlement of Christians in the cities while leaving Muslim majorities in the rural communities was pursued, configurating a 70%–30% balance between mudéjares and Christians settlers in the Serranía de Ronda.

In the early 16th century, a series of edicts enacted that mudéjares from the Crown of Castile must either leave or convert. The practice of Taqiyya was nonetheless common among converts from Islam (Moriscos) and cultural and religious continuity was prevalent in the area until the Alpujarras revolt. Upon the 1570 decision to resettle the so-called moriscos de paces (Moriscos uninvolved in the uprising) away from the Kingdom of Granada and the fateful actions of municipal Christian militias helmed by Antonio de Luna involving theft and enslaving, the hitherto largely peaceful morisco community in the Serranía de Ronda radicalised. Moriscos engaged in guerrilla warfare and banditry, taking advantage of their superior knowledge of the area.

In the early 19th century, the Napoleonic invasion and the subsequent Peninsular War caused much suffering in Ronda, whose inhabitants were reduced from 15,600 to 5,000 in three years. Ronda's area became the base first of guerrilla warriors, then of numerous bandits, whose deeds inspired artists such as Washington Irving, Prosper Mérimée, and Gustave Doré. In the 19th century, the economy of Ronda was mainly based on agricultural activities. In 1918, the city was the seat of the Assembly of Ronda, in which the Andalusian flag, coat of arms, and anthem were designed.

Ronda's Romero family—from Francisco, born in 1698, to his son Juan, to his famous grandson Pedro, who died in 1839—played a principal role in the development of modern Spanish bullfighting. In a family responsible for such innovations as the use of the cape, or muleta, and a sword especially designed for the kill, Pedro in particular transformed bullfighting into its modern form.

Ronda was heavily affected by the Spanish Civil War, which led to emigration and depopulation. The scene in chapter 10 of Hemingway's For Whom the Bell Tolls, describing the 1936 execution of Fascist sympathisers in a (fictional) village who are thrown off a cliff, is considered to be modeled on actual events of the time in Ronda.

== Geography ==
Ronda lies in a mountainous area about 750 m (2,460 ft) above mean sea level. The inner relief is gentle and includes areas of pastureland and vegetable and cereal growing areas. The Guadalevín River runs through the city, dividing it in two and carving out the steep, 100-plus-meter-deep El Tajo canyon above which the city perches. The Spanish fir is endemic to the mountains surrounding Ronda.

== Main sights ==
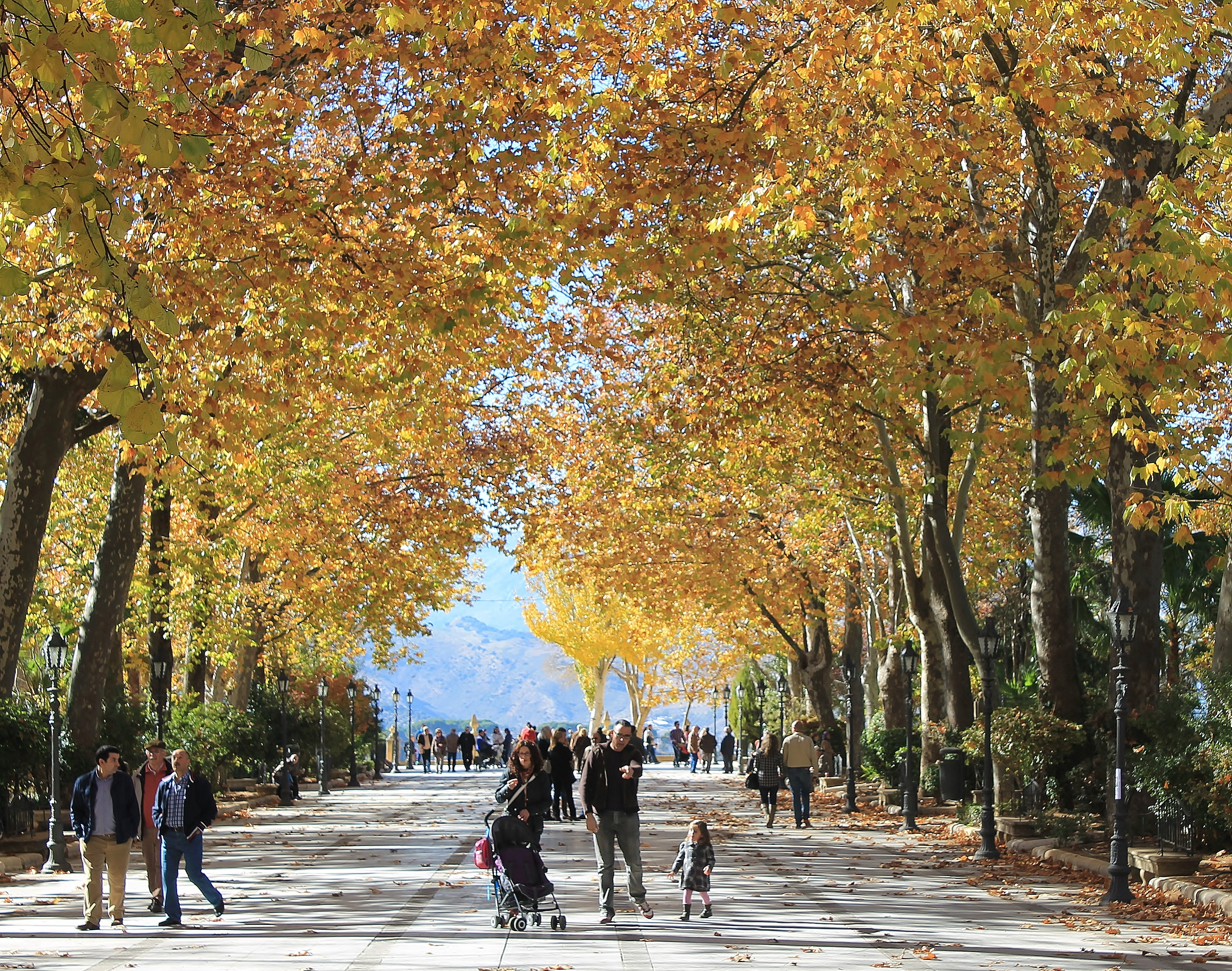
Alameda del Tajo Ronda

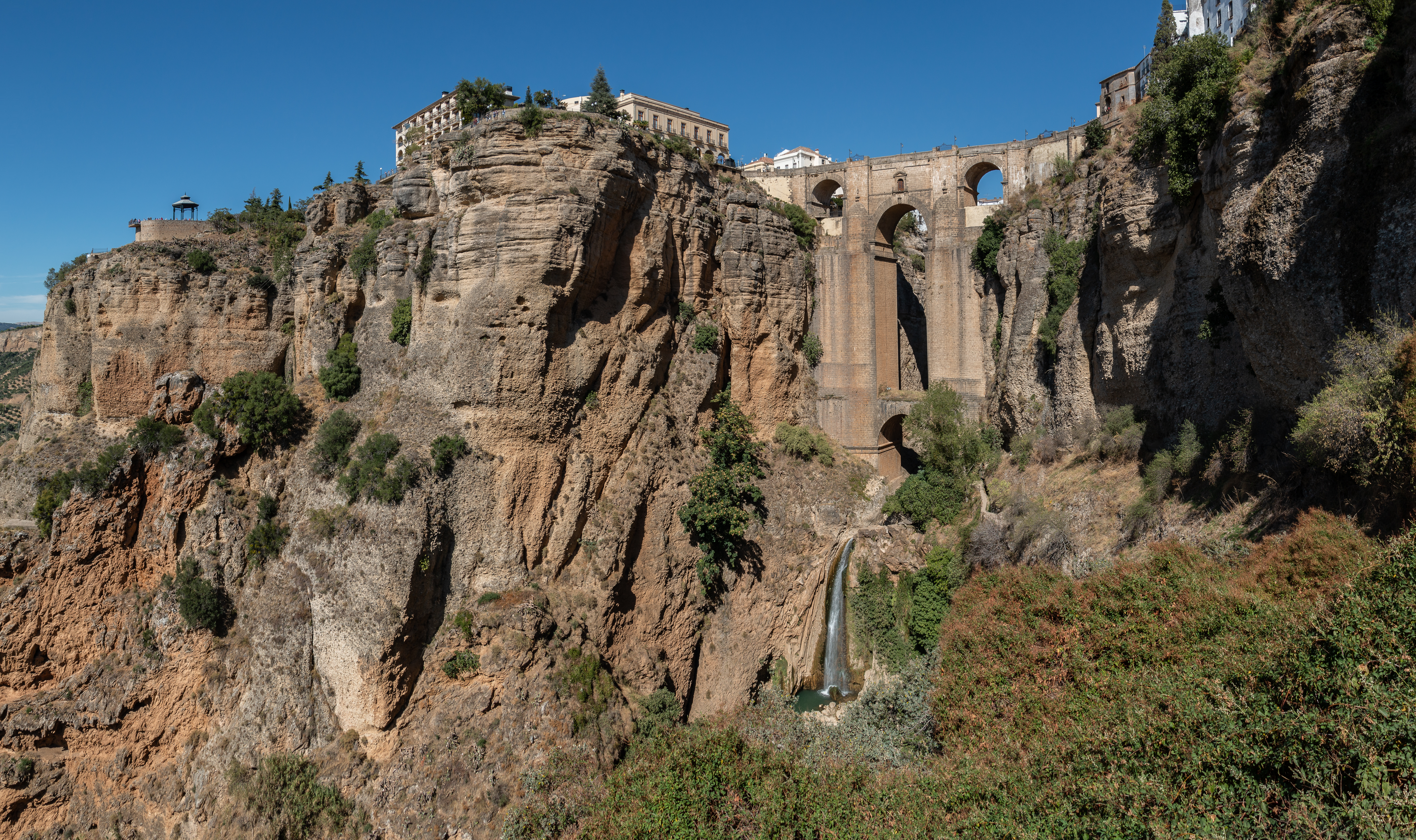
The Puente Nuevo bridge in Ronda

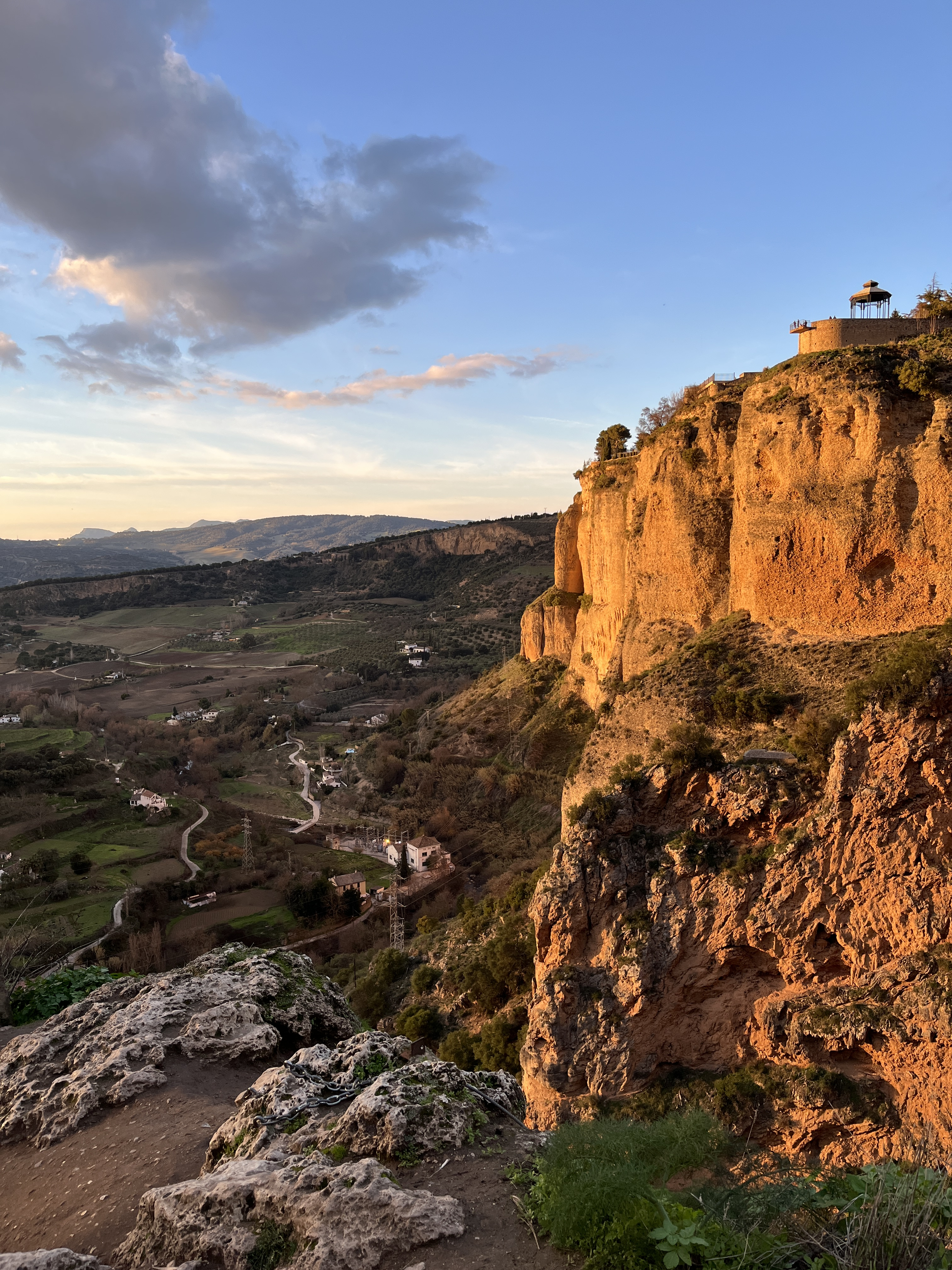
Sunset from the Puente Nuevo bridge

- Three bridges span the Tajo canyon: Puente Romano "Roman Bridge" (also known as the Puente Arabe "Arabic Bridge", as the foundation is Roman and it was rebuilt above in the Arabic Period); Puente Viejo "Old Bridge" (also known as the Puente San Miguel "St. Michael's Bridge"); and Puente Nuevo "New Bridge". The term nuevo is something of a misnomer, as the building of this bridge commenced in 1751 and took until 1793 to complete. The Puente Nuevo is the tallest of the bridges, towering 120 m (390 ft) above the canyon floor. The former town hall, which stands next to the Puente Nuevo, is the site of a Parador and has a view of the Tajo canyon.
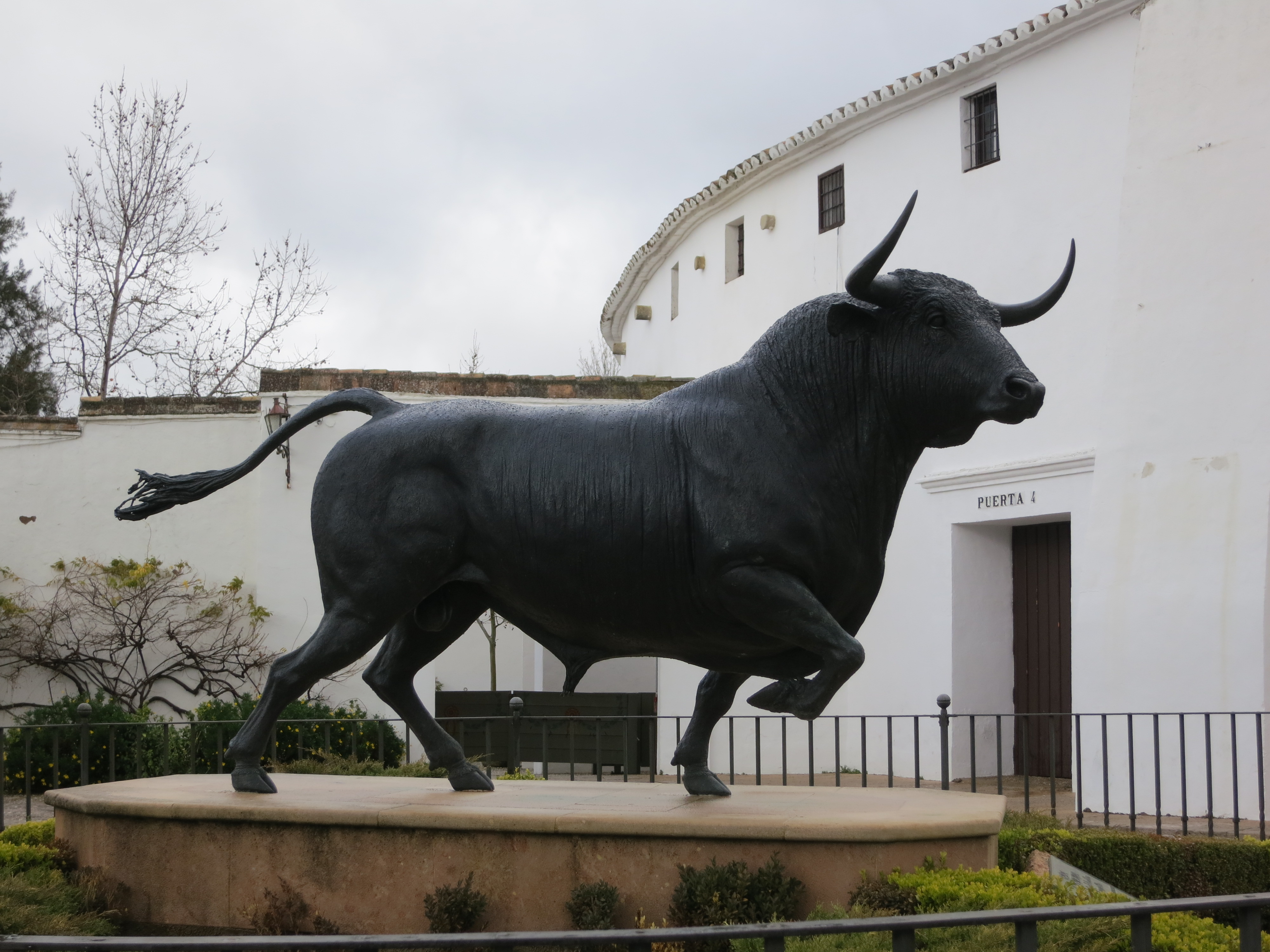
  Outside the Ronda Bullring
- The Corrida Goyesca is a bullfight that takes place once a year in Ronda in the Plaza de Toros de Ronda, one of the oldest and the best-preserved bullring in Spain. It was built in 1784 in the Neoclassical style by the architect José Martin de Aldehuela, who also designed the Puente Nuevo.
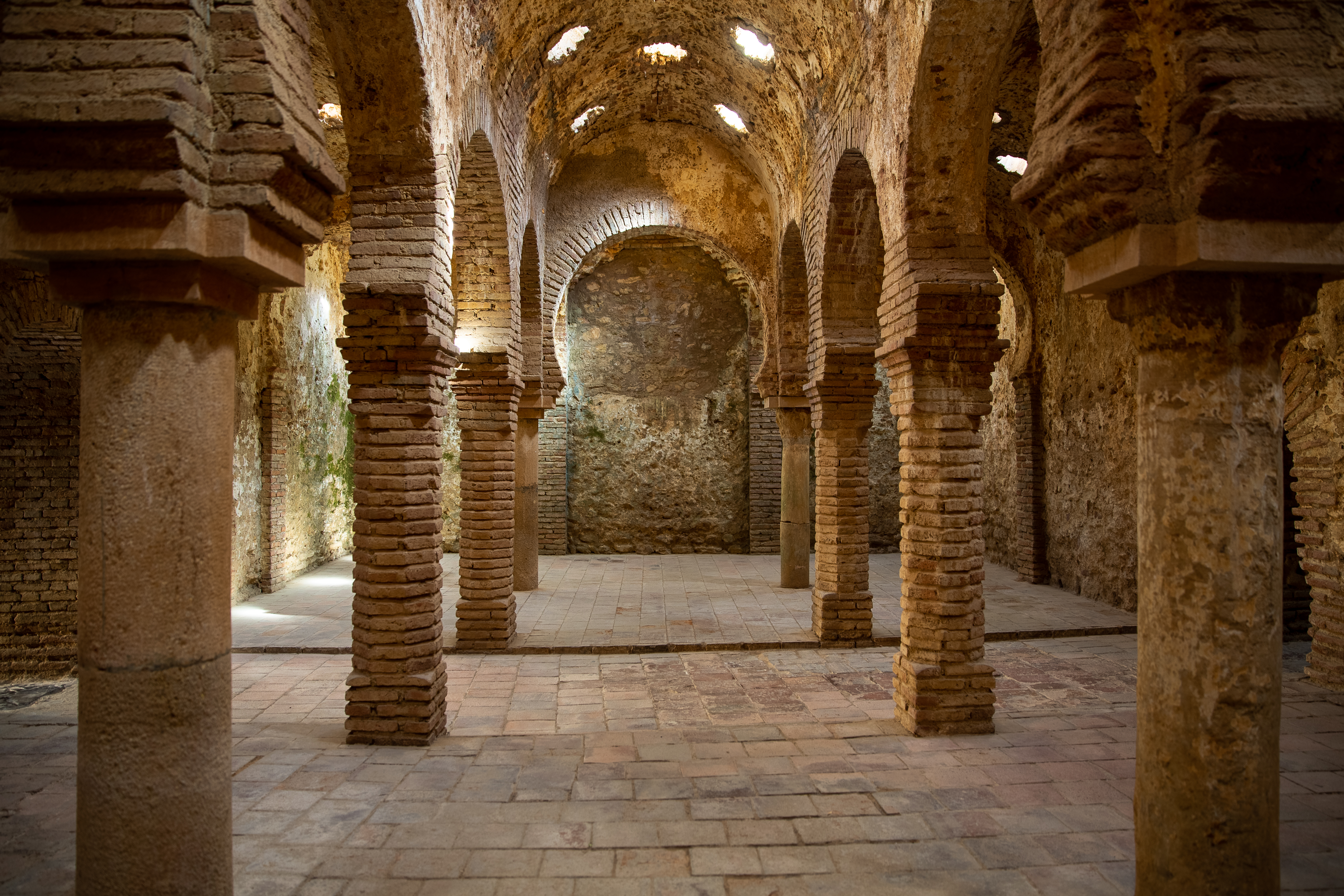
  Inside the Arabic baths
- The partially intact Baños Arabe ("Arabic baths") are found below the city, beside the Puente Arabe (also known as the Puente Romano) and date back to the 13th and 14th centuries. They can be visited, but are no longer in use as baths. The Arab Baths used to fulfil the function of purifying the visitors who came to the city of Ronda. They are the best preserved Arabic baths according to Junta de Andalucia.
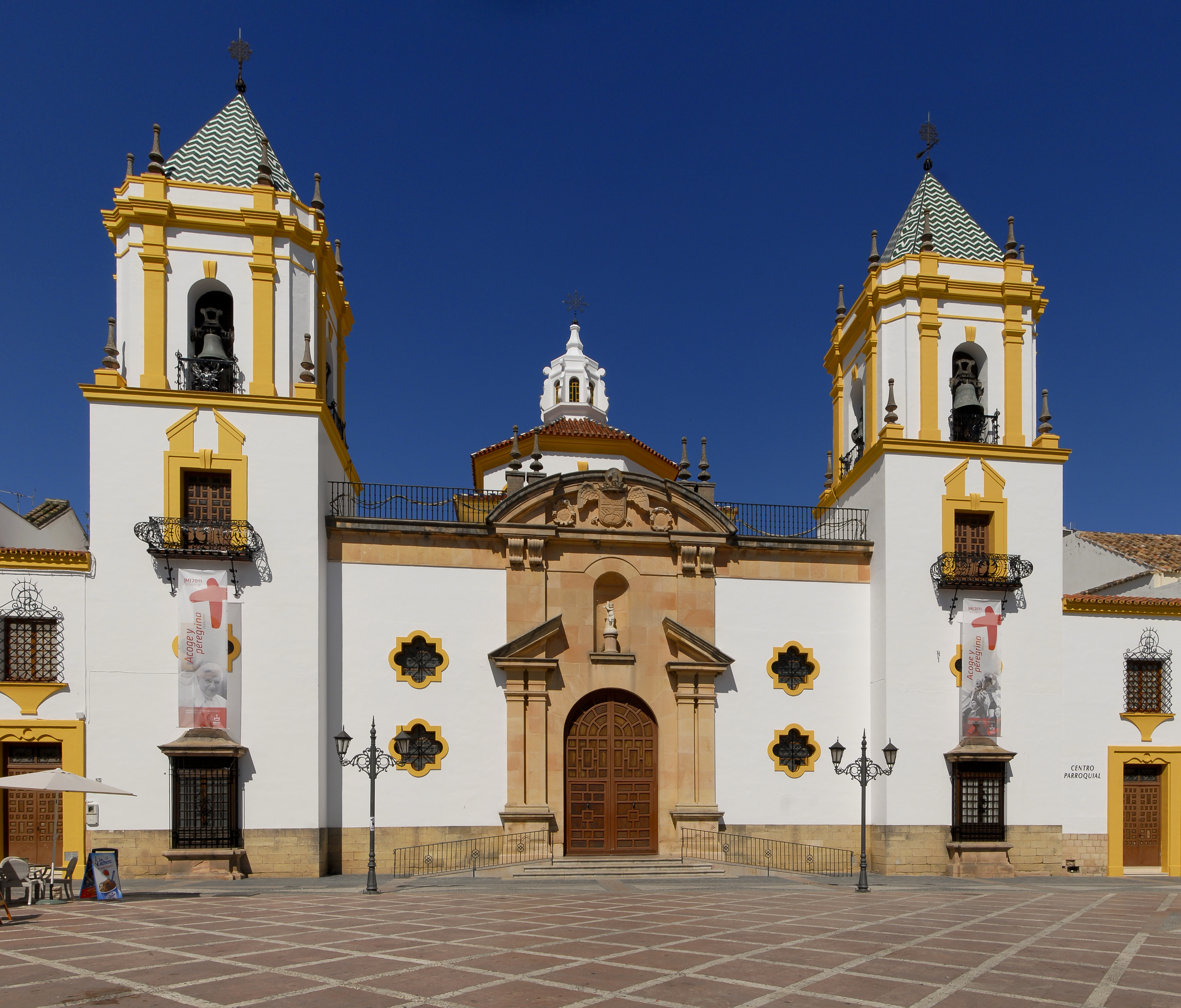
  Plaza del Socorro
- The Plaza del Socorro is the modern political centre of Ronda. It was here that Blas Infante showed the Andalusian flag and coat of arms for the first time in 1918. The parish church of Socorro (Parroquia de Nuestra Señora del Socorro) was only built in 1956. The building known as the Casino and Circulo de Artistas (Artists' Society) is located on the north side of Ronda's Plaza del Socorro.
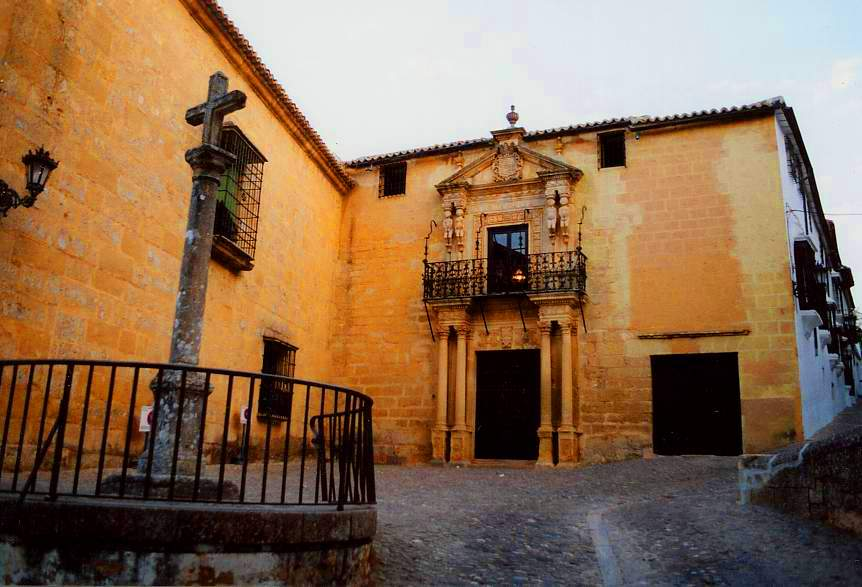
  Palace of the Marqués de Salvatierra
- The Palace (palacio) of the Marqués de Salvatierra opens irregularly as a small museum of Renaissance art and artefacts. The palace is an 18th-century renovation of an earlier 16th century building gifted to the family of Don Vasco Martín de Salvatierra by the Catholic Monarchs when they redistributed the spoils of the Reconquest. In 1994, Madonna obtained a permit to shoot inside the palace for the music video of "Take a Bow".
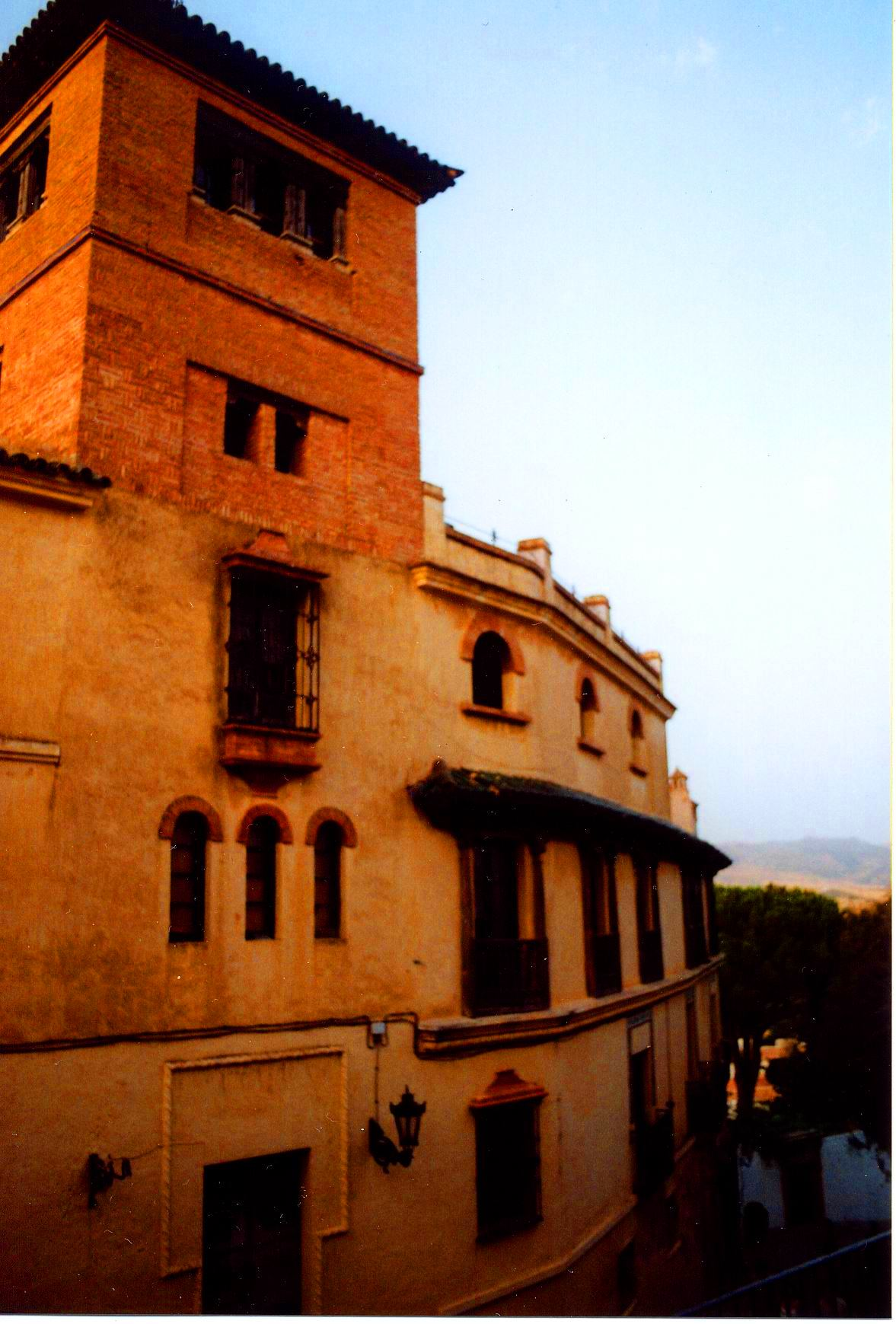
  Casa del Rey Moro
- Despite the name, the Casa del Rey Moro was never the home of a Moorish king. It was built in the 18th century, when Moorish Spain was already a distant memory. Its apparently Moorish gardens are even more recent, having been designed by the French landscape gardener Jean Claude Forestier in 1912. The house does incorporate one genuine and important relic of Ronda's Moorish era: the so-called Water Mine, a set of steps down to the river carved into the cliff wall.
- Serranía de Ronda is filled with pueblos blancos which are approachable by car. The position of the town of Ronda provides views over the mountains of Serranía de Ronda.

== Cultural influence ==
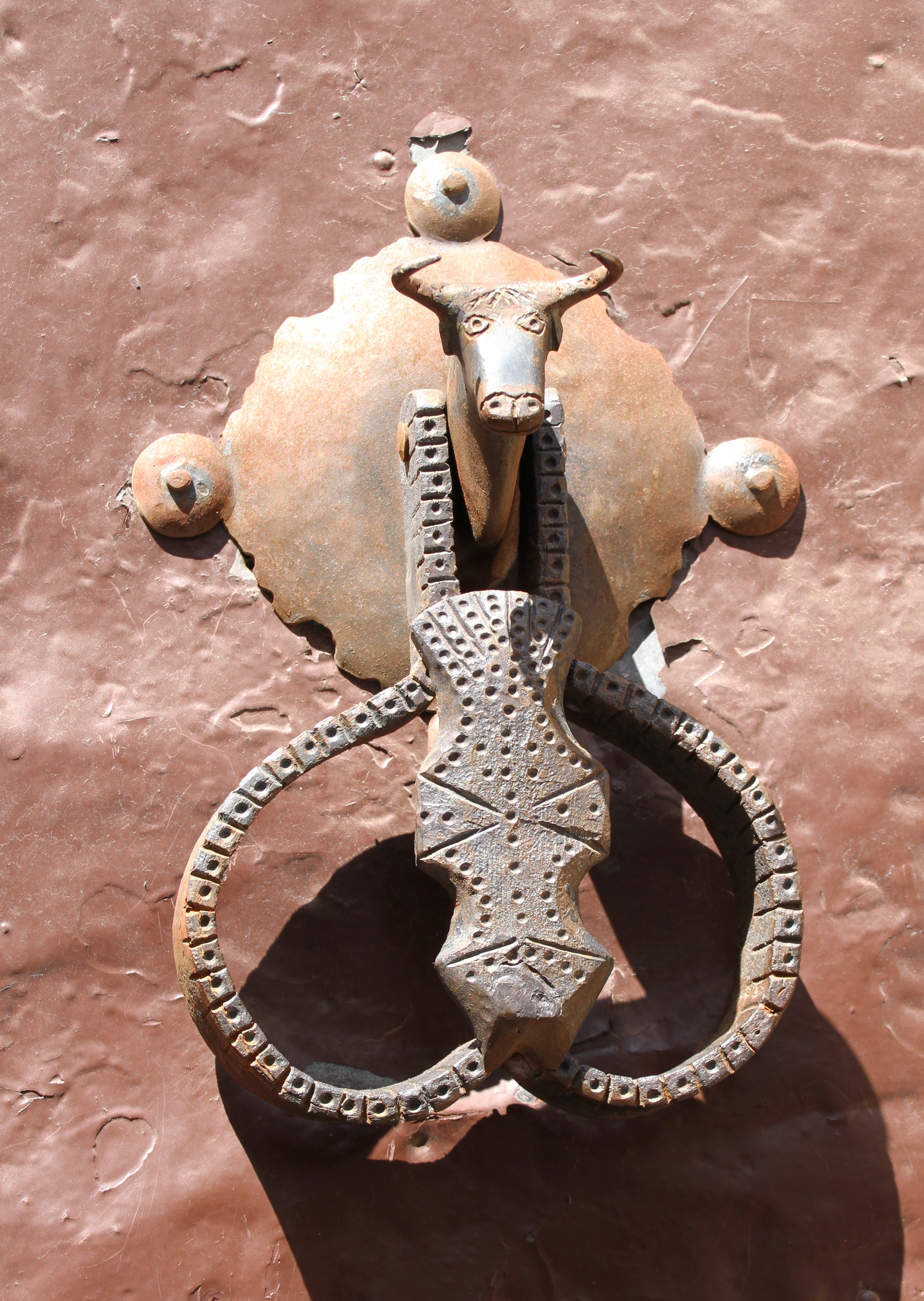
Doorknocker at the Ronda Bullring

American artists Ernest Hemingway and Orson Welles spent many summers in Ronda as part-time residents of Ronda's old-town quarter called La Ciudad. Both wrote about Ronda's beauty and famous bullfighting traditions. Their collective accounts have contributed to Ronda's popularity over time.

In the first decades of the 20th century, the famous German poet Rainer Maria Rilke spent extended periods in Ronda, including three months at the Hotel Reina Victoria (built in 1906) between December 1912 and February 1913; his room remains to this day as he left it, a minimuseum of Rilkeana. According to the hotel's publicity, Rilke wrote (though probably not in Spanish) He buscado por todas partes la ciudad soñada, y al fin la he encontrado en Ronda and No hay nada más inesperado en España que esta ciudad salvaje y montañera ("I have sought everywhere the city of my dreams, and I have finally found it in Ronda" and "Nothing is more startling in Spain than this wild and mountainous city.")

Hemingway's novel For Whom the Bell Tolls describes the execution of Nationalist sympathizers early in the Spanish Civil War. The Republicans murder the Nationalists by throwing them from cliffs in an Andalusian village, and Hemingway allegedly based the account on killings that took place in Ronda at the cliffs of El Tajo.

Orson Welles said he was inspired by his frequent trips to Spain and Ronda (e.g. his unfinished film about Don Quixote). After he died in 1985, his ashes were buried in a well on the rural property of his friend, retired bullfighter Antonio Ordóñez.

English writer George Eliot's book Daniel Deronda ("Daniel of Ronda") tells the story of a Spanish Jew brought up as an Englishman. Some speculation existed that Eliot's ancestors had lived in Ronda prior to the expulsion of the Jews from Spain in 1492.

In the fashion world, Italian designer Giorgio Armani specially designed the bullfighting costume called ‘Goyesco’ for famed bullfighter Cayetano Rivera Ordóñez on the occasion of the Corrida Goyesca that took place on September 6, 2009, in Ronda. Cayetano's suit of lights was in the Goyaesque style, comprising a jacket, trousers, and cloak in techno-satin. The three pieces were embroidered with sequins, small glitter stones, and thread, all matching the colour of the background fabric.

Ronda was used as the setting for the flower market in the 2017 animated movie Ferdinand.

== Transport ==
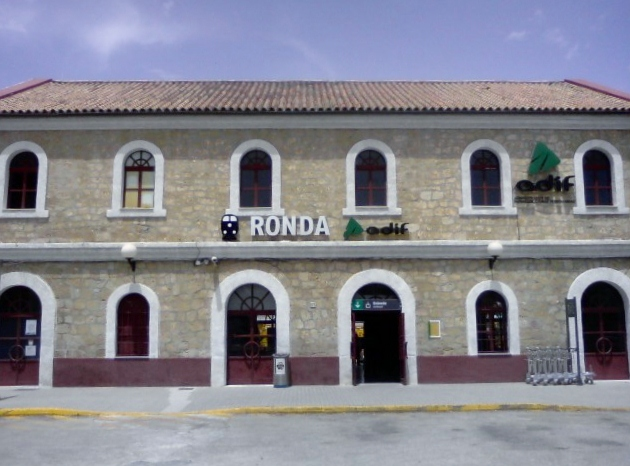
Ronda train station

Ronda is accessible via highways (Autovía A-374) and by rail from Algeciras and from Córdoba. A direct train from Madrid to Ronda operates twice daily.

The single-track railway between Ronda and Algeciras was built between 1890 and 1892 by the Algeciras Gibraltar Railway Company. It enabled the British military officers to escape the summer heat of Gibraltar. The railway was built by James Morrison, an engineer, in partnership with Alexander Henderson, 1st Baron Faringdon, a financier. The station at Ronda was opened in 1892.

== International relations ==
=== Twin towns – sister cities ===
Ronda is twinned with:

- Cuenca, Spain
- Chefchaouen, Morocco
- Castiglion Fiorentino, Italy
- Ontinyent, Spain
- Ceuta, Spain

== Notable people ==
- Candela Sierra (born 1990), filmmaker, and comic book writer and artist

== See also ==
- List of municipalities in Málaga
