= Martín de Aldehuela =

Architect (1729–1802)

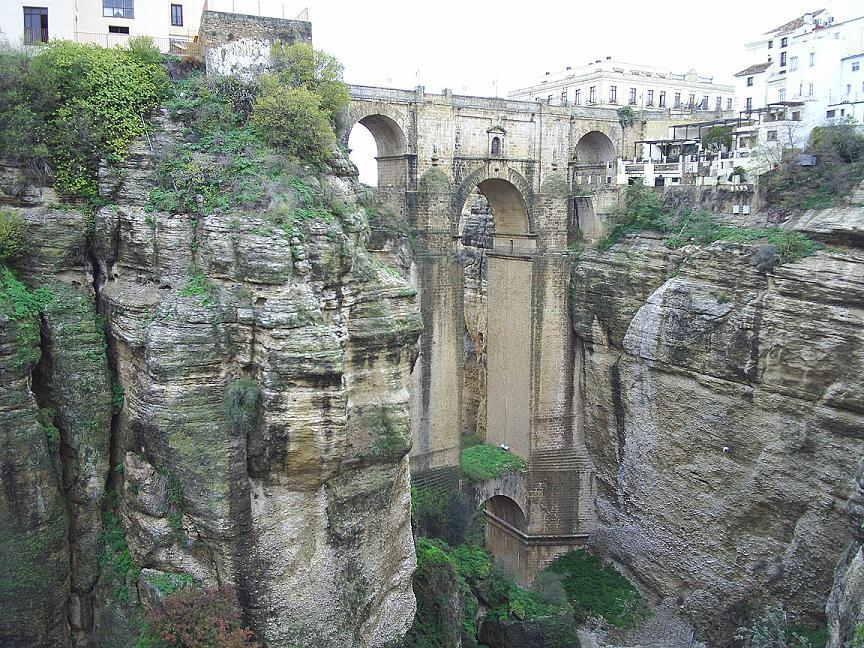
Puente Nuevo, designed by Martín de Aldehuela

José Martín de Aldehuela (16 January 1724– 7 September 1802) was a Spanish architect, born in Manzanera, in Teruel Province, Aragon. Aldehuela was an adopted name, probably for sentimental reasons. He was not paid for most of his projects, and neither for any of the titles bestowed upon him for his architectural work. He was primarily active in Málaga Province. Despite being an architect, he never actually received the title from the Academy of Fine Arts. He was also known for his furniture construction and decoration.

== Early life ==
Aldehuela was born on 16 January, 1724, though some sources instead say he was born on 5 November, 1729. His original name was not Aldehuela- Aldehuela is a toponym, and he probably adopted the name for sentimental reasons, as his early workshop was located in nearby Aldehuela, around 1772.

While he was still young, he was trained to be a sculptor, though different sources disagree if he was trained by his family or in Valencia. He was initially educated with his uncle, who was also known as José Martín, and later under José Corbinos and Francisco de Moyo.

His first recorded work is the main altarpiece of Teruel's Church of San Andrés, which was begun by Francisco de Moyo in 1747.

== In Cuenca ==
Some of his earliest architectural works were in Cuenca, which he first traveled to around 1747. In Cuenca, he helped with the construction of the cathedral after he came into contact with Ventura Rodríguez, who was already working on the project, and had constructed the cathedral's primary chapel, as well as the transperente, the large glass dome. In Cuenca, he became acquainted with the architecture of the Italian Baroque. Later on, he dropped the rocaille style he had been using entirely and began using a style influenced by the Italian Baroque. In the Cathedral of Cuenca, he used this style on its cloisters, the upper part of the altarpiece, the chapel, and the vestibule. He also proposed designs for the facade of the cathedral. His work on the Pilar Chapel, between 1769 and 1771, was recognised by Fernando Chueca Goitia as his best work.

In Cuenca, he built the Church of the Dominican Convent of San Pablo around 1756. Most of his buildings in Cuenca were built with the rocaille style, such as the Church of the Virgin of the Lights and the church of Saint Anthony, which were both built between 1760 and 1764. After this, he did not use the rocaille style very much again.

He received the title of Master of Fountains and Aqueducts in 1766. Later, he was also given the title of Chief Master of Pious Works by the Diocese of Cuenca.

== In Málaga ==
In 1776, the bishop of Albarracín, Molina Larios, moved his seat to Málaga. He already knew Aldehuela from his works in Teruel and invited him to Málaga to complete the reconstruction on the city's cathedral in 1778. However, Aldehuela did not finish it, due to a lack of funding, since most of the money went toward the construction of the aqueduct of San Telmo, which was of monumental importance to the water supply in Malaga. The aqueduct, stretching eleven kilometres, has thirty bridges. He completed it in 1782. Despite not finishing the cathedral, he helped in many elements of its construction, such as the organ case, which he made with the help of organ-maker Julián de la Orden, as well as its tabernacle. He presented more ideas as well, but they were turned down and never realised. Because of his work, however, he was appointed as Master Builder of General Minor Works by the cathedral in 1782, though he was not paid for this position.

While there, also undertook many smaller projects on churches and architecture within the city, including its Episcopal Palace, which was started by another architect named Antonio Ramos.

After Aldehuela was invited by the bishop to Málaga, he moved there permanently, staying there for the rest of his life. However, he still traveled to other areas to help on construction projects there. During this stage of his career, he mainly used a style influenced by Andalusian architecture.

== In Ronda ==
In 1793, just outside the city of Ronda, he completed the Puente Nuevo ("New Bridge"), that was originally started in 1759 but remained unfinished. This became one of his best-known works. He also designed the Plaza de Toros de Ronda, one of the oldest bullrings still in use.

== Other projects ==
One of his earliest works was the Oratory of San Felipe Neri, which has been seen as the peak of his usage of the rocaille style. During his time working on the Cathedral of Cuenca, he also built the Church of San Millán in Orihuela del Tremedal.

In Antequera, he helped design a collegiate church, mainly putting on the finishing touches. He also worked on numerous other architectural projects, including the cemetery of Cortes de la Frontera, a town to the south-west of Ronda.

== Family ==
José Martín de Aldehuela had eleven children. The only one that outlived him was named Antonio José Vicente, who was the eldest from his first marriage. He was married twice, first to María Antonia Esteban from 1752 to 1773, and then to María Antonia Conejos from 1775 to 1791.

== Death ==
He died on 7 September, 1802, in Málaga, on Hornos Street. He was in near-poverty at the time. A legend arose that he died by throwing himself from the Puente Nuevo to avoid the construction of a bridge more beautiful than it, but this is false. He is allegedly buried in Malagueño Plaza in San Pedro Alcántara, but his grave is unmarked. His descendant, Rafael Aldehuela, wants to dig up the body and move it to a proper burial ground.

== Legacy ==
Despite his many works, Martín de Aldehuela is a fairly unknown figure. However, his memory is preserved through stories told by his family, as well as by his great-great-grandson, Rafael Aldehuela. Aldehuela intends to establish a foundation dedicated to him. A viewpoint, named the Mirador de Aldehuela after him, is located in Ronda, and allows visitors to view the Puerto Nuevo, which he built.

== Architectural styles ==
Martín de Aldehuela's work mainly fits into three stages. The first stage was the French rocaille style. The second style was inspired more by Italian Baroque architecture, especially the works of Francesco Borromini. His later, third style was inspired by local Andalusian architecture. However, Aldehuela often returned to early styles throughout his career.

In his work on pre-existing creations, including his decoration, he often improved that work using ornamentation. Meanwhile, floors in his projects often had complicated designs due to the connection of various spaces together. Altogether, he used many different styles, ranging from classicist architecture to Baroque architecture.
