= Guadalevín =

River in Spain

Coordinates: 36°44′23.91″N 5°10′4.86″W

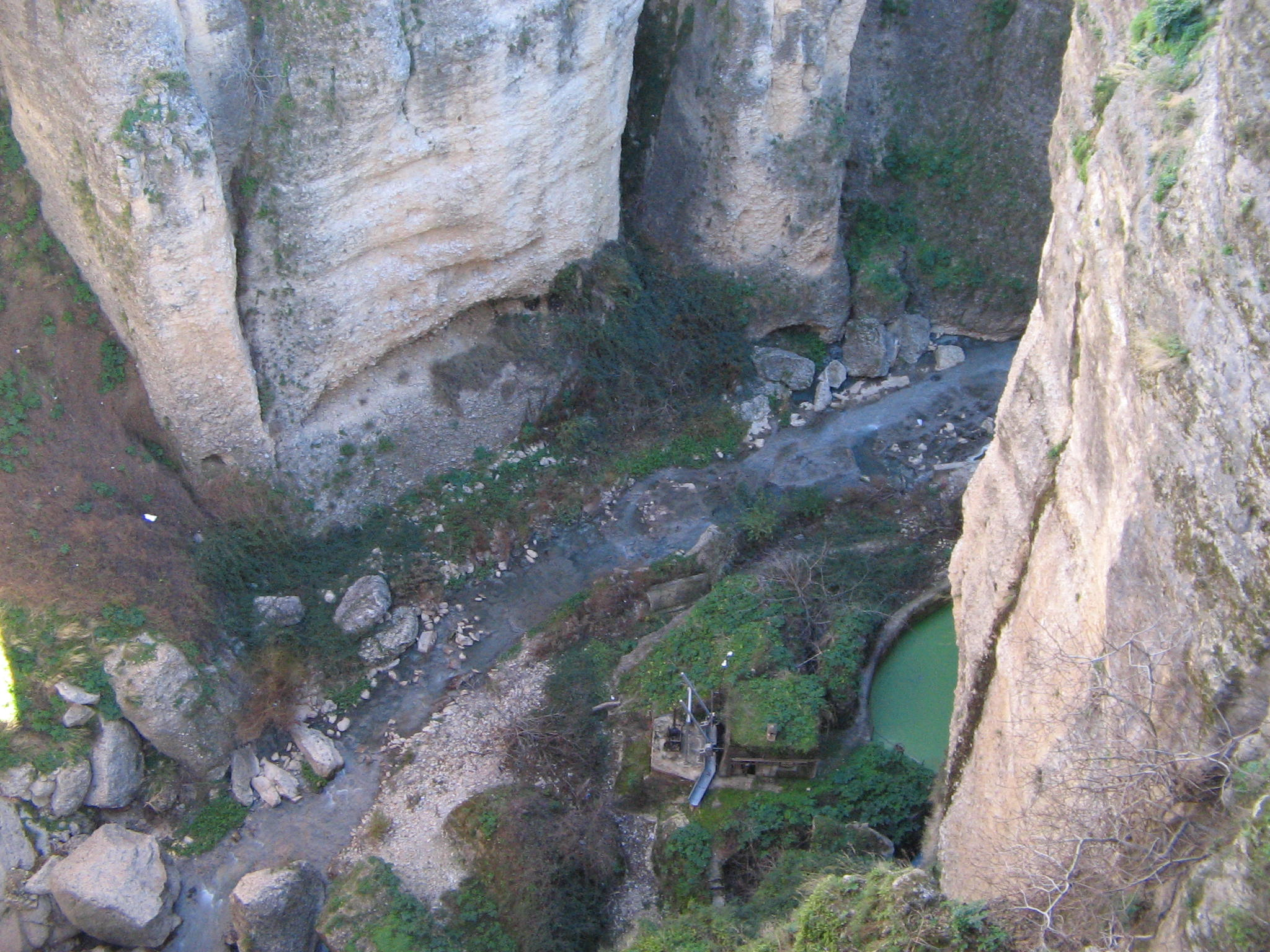
- View of the Guadalevín from one of the bridges at Ronda.

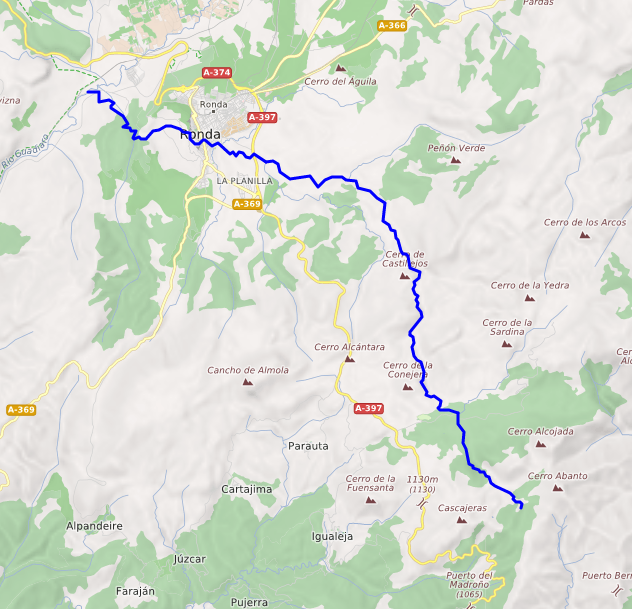
- Course of the Guadalevín
- Native name: Río Guadalevín (Spanish)

Location
- Country: Spain
- Region: Andalucía

Basin features
- River system: Guadiaro

The Guadalevín is a tributary of the river Guadiaro in Málaga, Andalusia, Spain. Its gorge divides the city of Ronda where it is spanned by three bridges, Puente Nuevo, Puente Viejo and Puente Romano.

The following is a translation of the Spanish Wikipedia article on the Guadalevin.

The Guadalevín River is a short river in the south of Spain (Andalusia) that runs entirely through the Serranía de Ronda, west of the province of Málaga, Spain. It originates in the Sierra de las Nieves, in the municipality of Igualeja, and ends at the Guadiaro river; it is thus in the Mediterranean basins of Andalusia and belongs to its hydrological demarcation. Almost all of its course has been declared a Special Area of Conservation (or ZEC to use the Spanish acronym).

Its name comes from Andalusī Arabic "وَادِيِّ اللِّبِنْ" (wādī al-lebín), which translates to «river of milk».

== Course ==
The headwaters of the Guadalevín river is located in the Sierra de las Nieves Natural Park, specifically in the Cañada del Cuerno, the nucleus of the Pinsapar de Ronda. Downstream, the Fuenfría arroyo joins it and it receives contributions from the Oreganal mountain range, including the Malillo spring. From there it is also called the Rio Grande.

Subsequently, it passes through the city of Ronda where it sculpts the Tajo Gorge and enters the Ronda plateau under the name of Guadalevín. In the area of La Indiana it meets the Guadalcobacín river, formed among others by the Ventilla arroyo, a turbulent course that flows through a river gorge with remarkable geodiversity in the municipality of Arriate.

The juncture of the Guadalevín and Guadalcobacín marks the point where the start of the Guadiaro river is generally considered to be located, although some authors assert that it happens a few kilometers below, when the [Guadares] river joins it from the Cueva del Gato.

The Guadalevín River zone is made up of gypsum marl, sandstone and limestone.

== Flora ==
The vegetation of the area presents characteristics typical of the lower Mesomediterranean and Thermomediterranean geological series of Ronda, Malacitano-Almijarense, Alpujarreña, Almería-Western and Manchego-Espunense Mesotrogerian, Juarez-Almería-Edafo-Hygrophilic Geoseries.

== Fauna ==
The characteristic fauna of the area is typical of the riverside, among which are the otter, the leper turtle and the Guadiana vogue. There are also some invertebrates such as crayfish, odonates and the black cork oak spider, which is an endemism from the south of the Iberian peninsula.

Also there are species of fish like the marine lamprey, tusk, the gypsy barbel, the Málaga chub, the eel; different amphibians such as the southern pintopod sapillo or the salamander subspecies that extends south of the Guadalquivir; and birds such as the blackbird, kingfisher and various species of birds of prey.

== See also ==
Puente Nuevo (Ronda) Puente Viejo (Ronda)

- List of rivers of Spain
