= Puente Viejo =

Bridge in Ronda, Spain

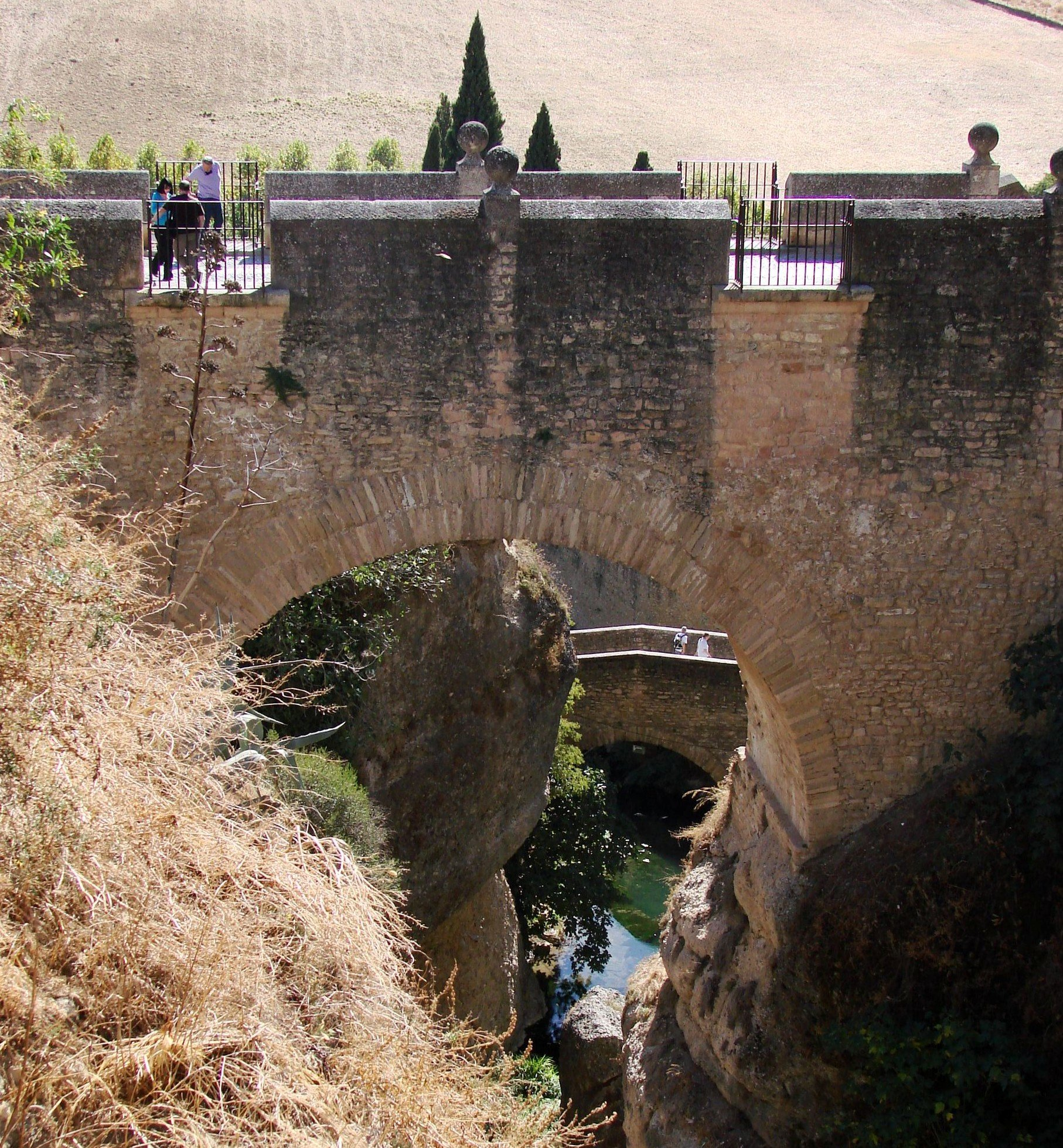
- Puente Viejo (Old Bridge) in the foreground with the Puente Romano below in the background.
- Coordinates: 36.739722°N 5.163303°W
- Carries: Pedestrians
- Crosses: Guadalevín River and El Tajo canyon
- Locale: Ronda

Location
- Interactive map of Puente Viejo

Puente Viejo (Spanish pronunciation: [ˈpwente ˈβjexo], "Old Bridge") is the second oldest and second lowest of the three bridges that span the 120-metre (390 ft) deep chasm that carries the Guadalevín River and divides the city of Ronda in southern Spain. Despite its name ('Old bridge'), it is newer than the Puente Romano ('Roman bridge'). It was built in 1616, and currently only carries pedestrian traffic.

== See also ==
- Puente Nuevo
- Ronda
- Guadalevín
