= Puente Nuevo =

Bridge in Ronda, Spain

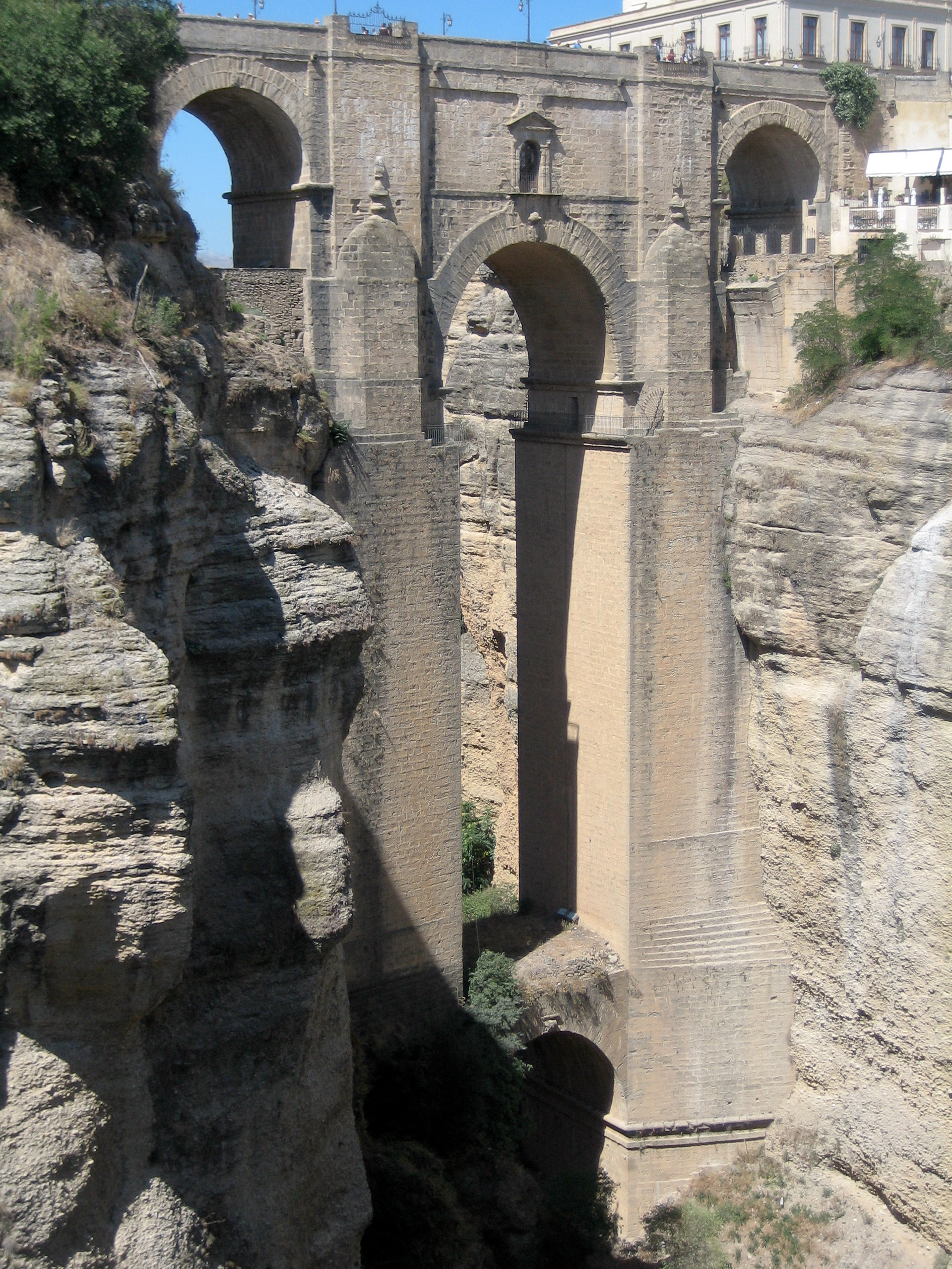
- Puente Nuevo in El Tajo gorge
- Coordinates: 36°44′26.69″N 5°9′57.25″W
- Carries: Vehicular traffic
- Crosses: Guadalevín River in El Tajo gorge
- Locale: Ronda

Characteristics
- Material: Stone
- Total length: 66 meters
- Height: 58 meters
- No. of spans: 3

History
- Designer: Domingo Lois de Monteagudo
- Construction start: 1759
- Construction end: 1793

Location
- Interactive map of Puente Nuevo

The Puente Nuevo (Spanish pronunciation: [ˈpwente ˈnweβo], "New Bridge"), completed in 1793, is the newest and largest of three bridges that span the 120-metre-deep (390 ft) chasm, the El Tajo Gorge, that carries the Guadalevín River and divides the city of Ronda, in southern Spain. The architect was José Martin de Aldehuela and the chief builder was Juan Antonio Díaz Machuca.

The construction of the newest bridge (the one standing as of 2024) was started in 1759 and took 34 years. There is a chamber above the central arch that was used for a variety of purposes, including as a prison. During the 1936–1939 civil war both sides allegedly used the prison as a torture chamber for captured opponents, killing some by throwing them from the windows to the rocks at the bottom of the El Tajo gorge. The chamber is entered through a square building that was once the guardhouse. It now contains an exhibition describing the bridge's history and construction.

Construction of the previous bridge started in 1735; this was the first attempt to span the gorge at this height. The architects Jose Garcia and Juan Camacho completed the bridge with a single arch design. This bridge was quickly and poorly built; the entire bridge collapsed in 1741, killing 50 people.

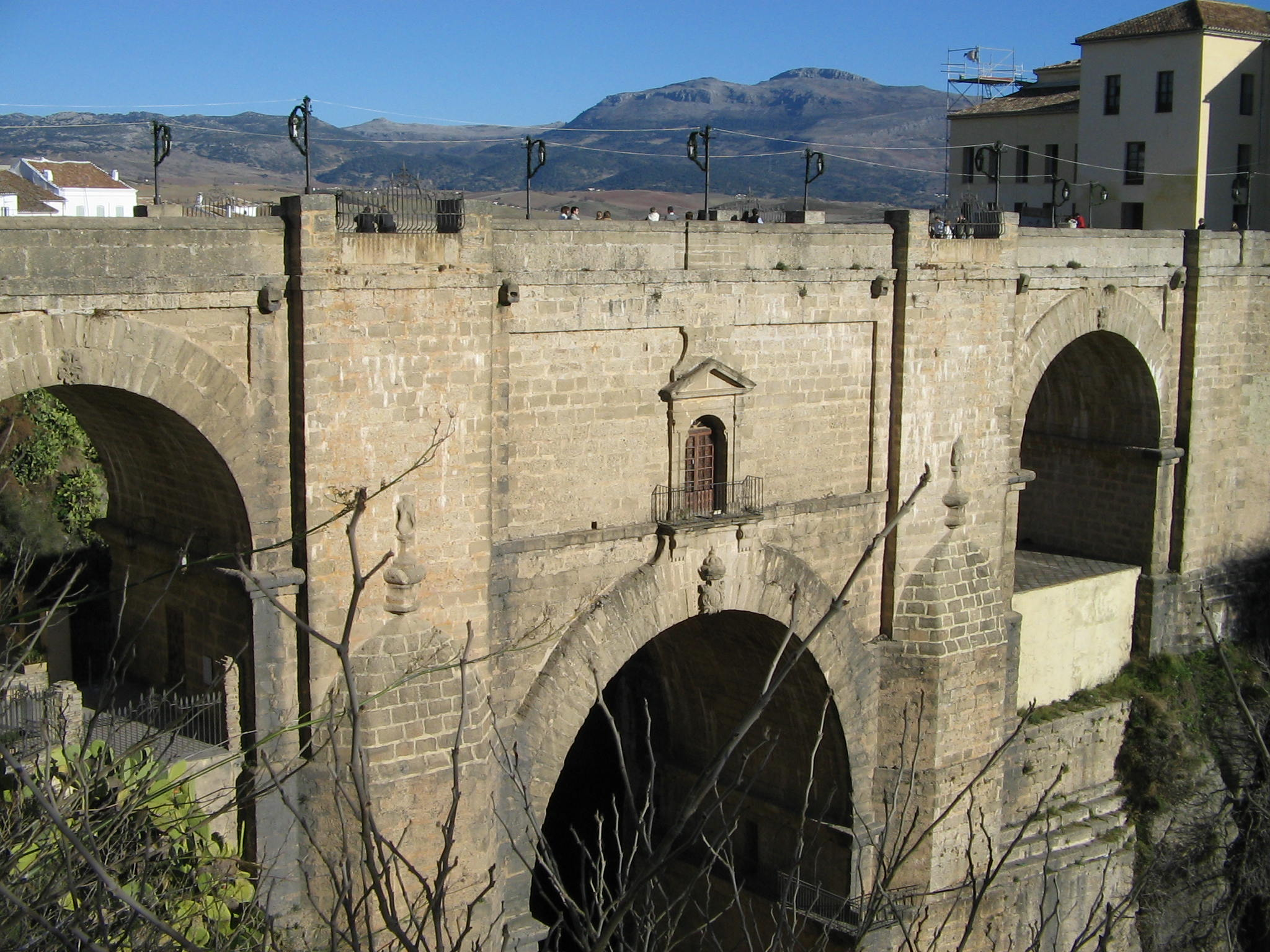

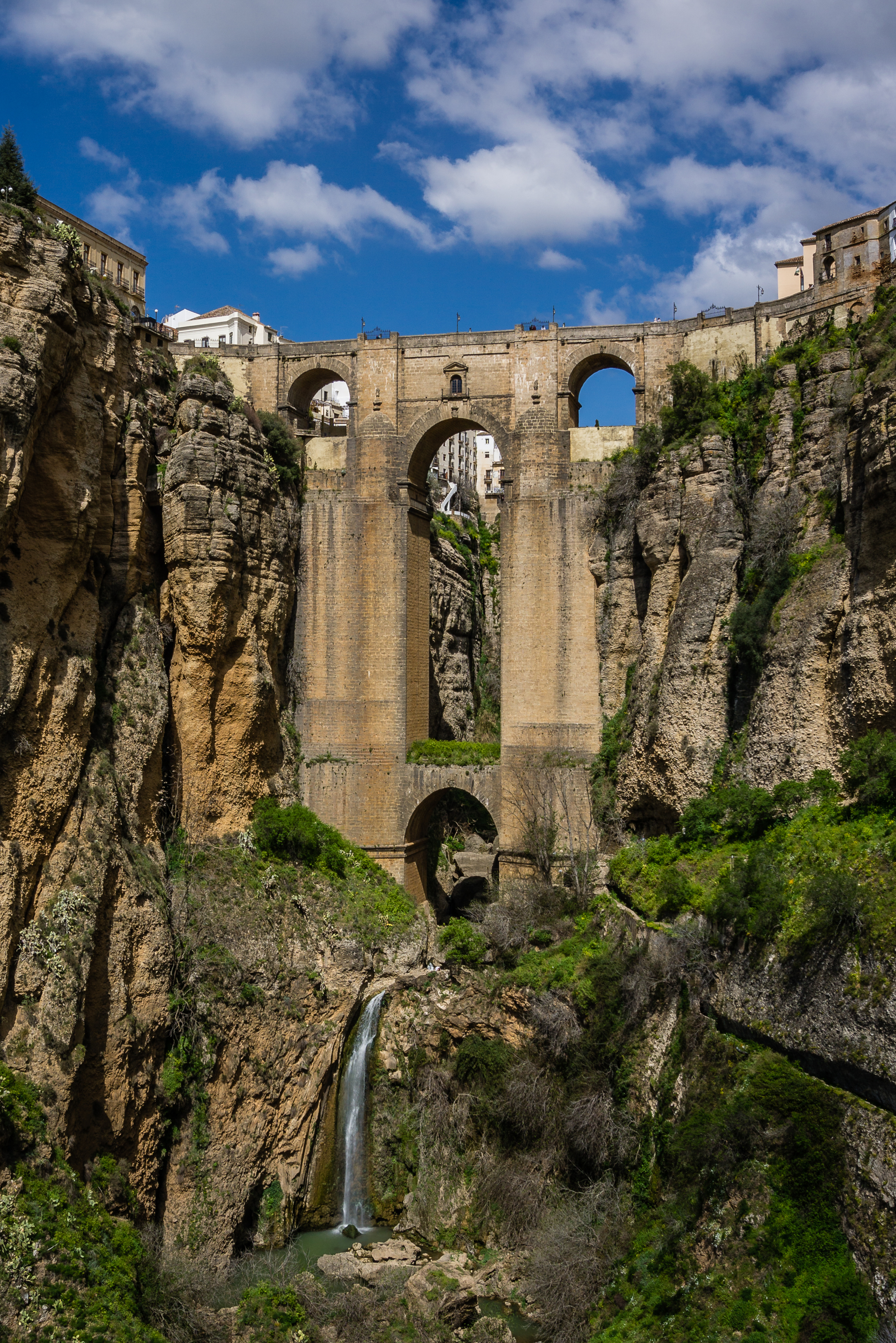

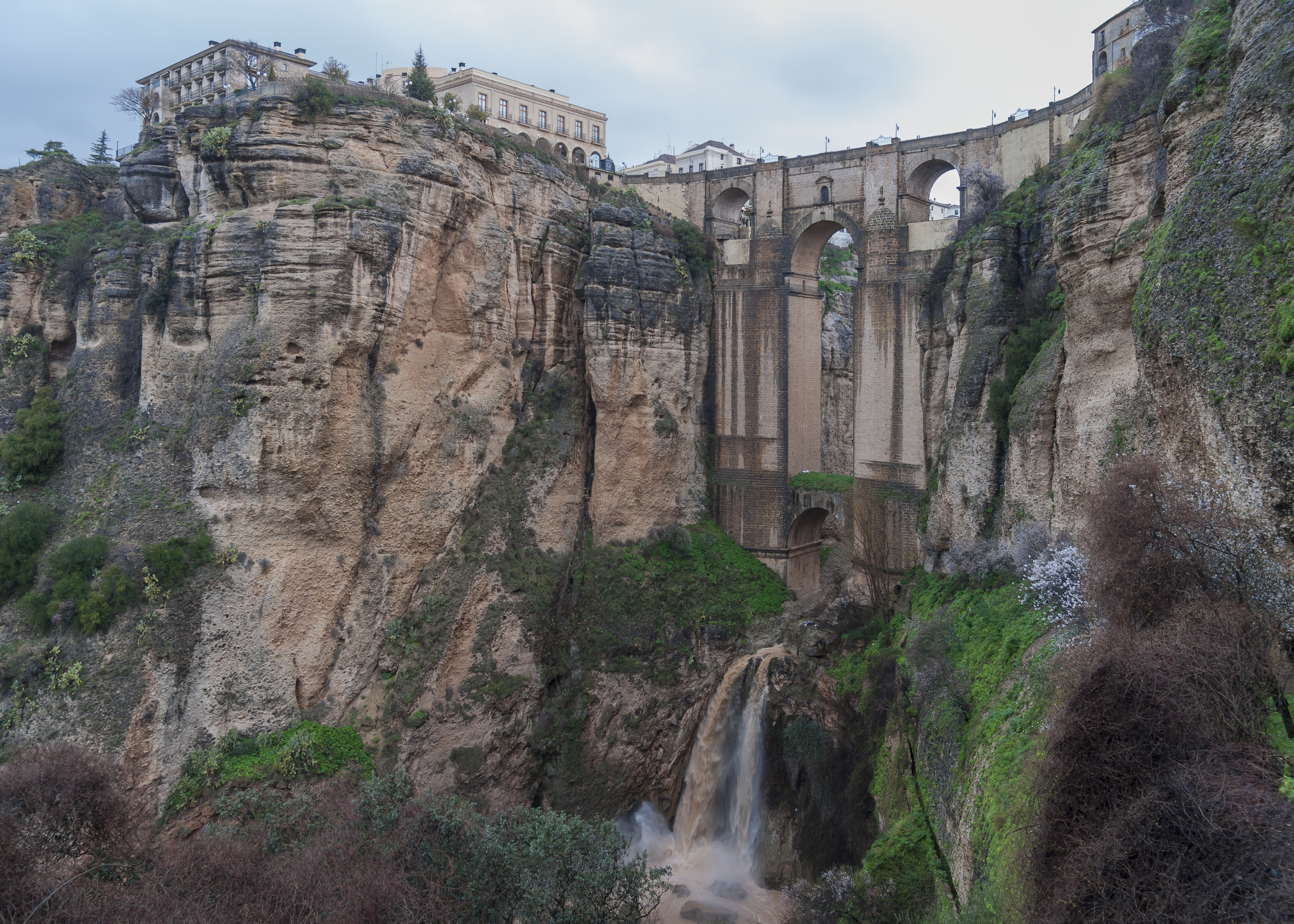

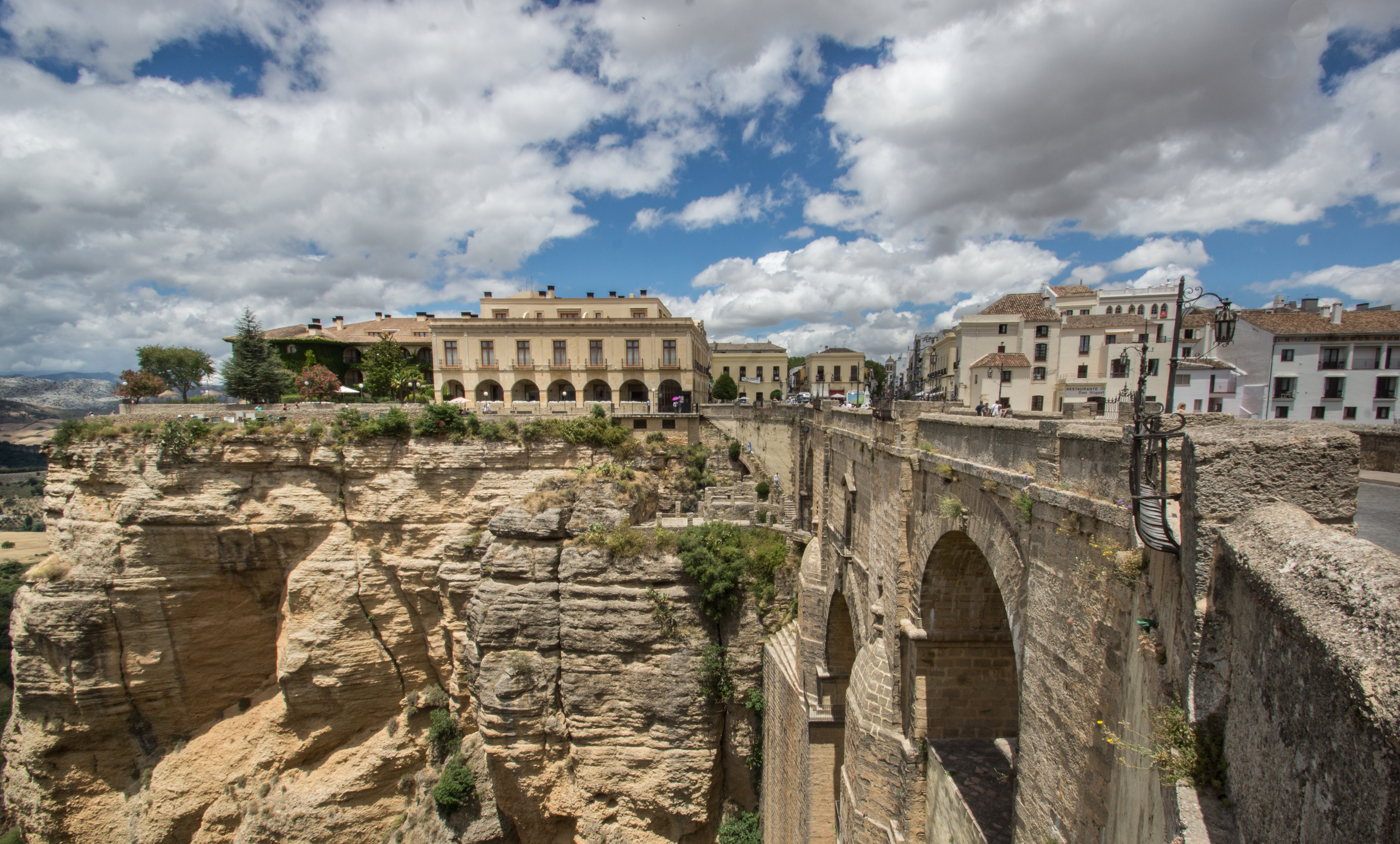

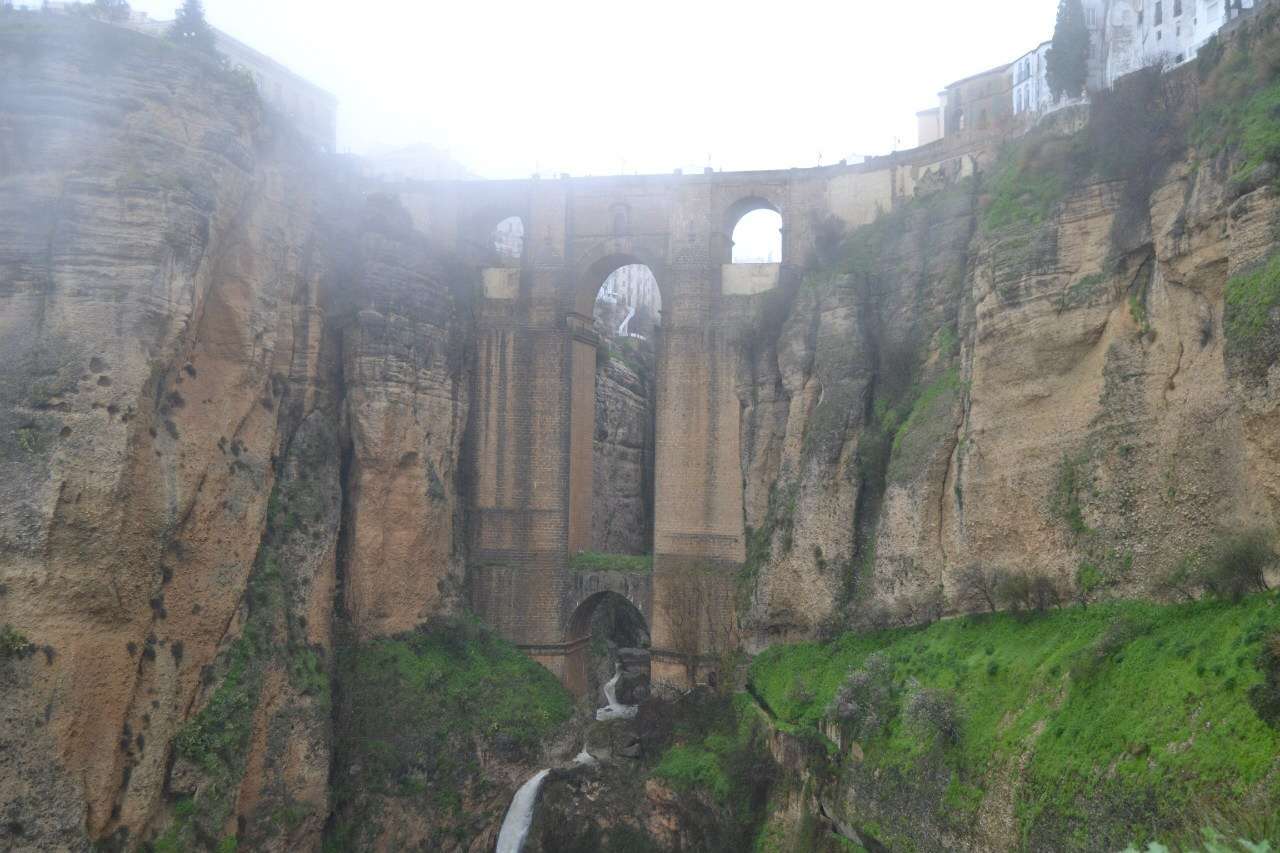

== See also ==
- Puente Viejo
- Ronda
- Guadalevín
