= Guadiaro (neighborhood) =

Neighborhood in Andalusia, Spain

Guardiaro
- Coordinates: 36°18′N 5°18′W

Guadiaro is a neighborhood (parish) of the city of San Roque on the right bank of the Guadiaro River in the Province of Cádiz, Andalusia, Spain. Local festivals are held the first week of July.

Due to its proximity to the coast and to the urbanization luxury Sotogrande, Guadiaro is mainly engaged in tourism. In the area there are several golf courses, which held, among other events, the Ryder Cup in the year 1997, and golf pole, as well as plenty of water sports. Takes its name from Guadiaro River.

Guadiaro is the archaeological site of Barbésula, an old Roman city.

The football team is the C.D. Guadiaro, founded in 1973 by townsfolk and with the help of local businesses.

Guadiaro is accessed by A-2103, which links with San Enrique de Guadiaro through the Iron Bridge and Guadiaro by outputs 130 and 132 of the A-7. The road A-2100 leads from Guadiaro to Castellar de la Frontera.

In August 2010 a roofed taxi stand entered service.
