= Guadiaro (river) =

River in Spain

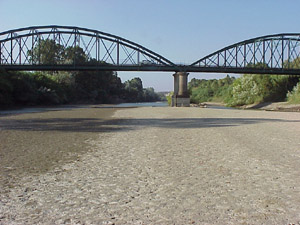
- Native name: Río Guadiaro (Spanish)

Location
- Country: Spain
- State: Andalusía
- Region: Cádiz

Physical characteristics
- Mouth: Mediterranean Sea
  - location: Andalusía, Spain
  - coordinates: 36°16′57″N 5°16′36″W
  - elevation: 0 m (0 ft)
- Length: 183 km (114 mi)

The Guadiaro is a river in the Spanish provinces of Cádiz and Málaga in the autonomous community of Andalusia, Spain. It flows southward from the Sierra Bermeja through the Sierra de Grazalema and discharges into the Mediterranean at Sotogrande. The river is notable for having some of the only marshland on the Costa del Sol. This marsh is protected by a 27 hectares (67 acres) nature preserve. There are several towns and communities near its mouth, Pueblonuevo de Guadiaro, Guadiaro, Torreguadiaro, Sotogrande, San Enrique, and Venta Nueva, all located within the San Roque municipality.

== See also ==
- List of rivers of Spain
