= List of professional wrestling attendance records in Europe =

List of the largest attendances in the history of European professional wrestling

The following is a list of professional wrestling attendance records in Europe. Unlike other parts of the world, almost all of the records set during the period contemporary to the "Pioneer-era" (1900s–1940s) in American wrestling still remain. A number of these events are also among the highest attended pro wrestling shows of all-time. According to this list, these include the stadium shows in Athens, Greece, especially those headlined by Jim Londos, held at the Apostolos Nikolaidis Stadium and Panathenaic Stadium from the late 1920s to early 1970s. Rafvela vs. Felix Lamban, promoted by Luis Bamala, was held at the Estadio Metropolitano on August 24, 1957, then the largest football stadium in Spain, drawing a crowd of over 35,000. All but fourteen of the events have been held in Greece, while six have been held in Bulgaria, four in Spain, two in Ireland, and one each in Denmark and Italy.

In the 21st century, Europe is dominated by the American professional wrestling promotion World Wrestling Entertainment which has controlled the industry in North America since 2002, although traditional styles of professional wrestling have survived in France and Germany/Austria, as well as the United Kingdom. As the World Wrestling Federation, it became the first national promotion in the U.S. during the 1980s wrestling boom. Its first-ever show in mainland Europe took place on October 23, 1987, at the sold-out Bercy de Paris in Paris, France. The main event was a match between Harley Race and Junkyard Dog featuring André the Giant as special guest referee. The event was attended by 12,000 people and televised on Canal+. In the modern-era, the highest attended shows are from WWE's weekly television programs WWE Raw and WWE SmackDown, with the June 18, 2005 episode of WWE SmackDown in Dublin, Ireland being the company's most attended wrestling event in Europe. Only two of the attendances listed are non-WWE events, with the European Wrestling Federation (Note: The Italian promotion of the 2000s, not the French promotion of 1988–1993 which provided matches filmed in France for TF1/Eurosport's television show New Catch) and Nu-Wrestling Evolution being the only European-based promotions on the list.

== Events and attendances ==
Promotion	Event	Location	Venue	Attendance	Main Event(s)	Ref.
—	Jim Londos vs. Karl Zybszko; December 9, 1928	Athens, Greece	Panathenaic Stadium	65,000	Jim Londos vs. Karl Zybszko	
—	Jim Londos vs. Kola Kwariani; October 22, 1933	Athens, Greece	Panathenaic Stadium	60,000+ (Note: There are different reports on the attendance of the event with numbers ranging from 60,000 to as high as 110,000 or 125,000.)	Jim Londos vs. Kola Kwariani for the World Heavyweight Championship with special referee George Tragos	
—	Jim Londos vs. Johannes van der Walt; July 25, 1937	Athens, Greece	Panathenaic Stadium	50,000+ (Note: There are different reports on the attendance of the event with numbers ranging from 50,000 to as high as 70,000.)	Jim Londos vs. Johannes van der Walt	
—	Jim Londos vs. Dinarli Mehmed; August 2, 1936	Athens, Greece	Panathenaic Stadium	50,000+ (Note: There are different reports on the attendance of the event with numbers ranging from 50,000 to as high as 60,000.)	Jim Londos vs. Dinarli Mehmed	
—	Jim Londos vs. Kola Kwariani; September 30, 1933	Athens, Greece	Panathenaic Stadium	50,000	Jim Londos vs. Kola Kwariani for the World Heavyweight Championship	
—	Gino Garibaldi vs. Colonel Kobolo; 1927	Trieste, Italy		50,000	Gino Garibaldi vs. Colonel Kobolo	
—	Jim Londos vs. Karol Zbyszko; December 2, 1928	Athens, Greece	Panathenaic Stadium	40,000+ (Note: There are different reports on the attendance of the event with numbers ranging from 40,000 to as high as 50,000 or 65,000.)	Jim Londos vs. Karol Zbyszko	
—	Jim Londos vs. Jim Wright; October 3, 1956	Athens, Greece	Panathenaic Stadium	40,000	Jim Londos vs. Jim Wright	
Bamala	Rafvela vs. Felix Lamban; August 24, 1957	Madrid, Spain	Estadio Metropolitano	35,000+ (Note: The exact attendance figure is unknown, however, the event is described as being "impressively full". There are different reports on the capacity of the building with numbers ranging from 35,800 to 58,000.)	Rafvela vs. Felix Lamban in a 10-minute Challenge match for 20,000 pesetas	
—	Dan Koloff vs. Peter Ferestanoff; September 8, 1935	Sofia, Bulgaria	Yunak Stadium	30,000 (Note: Several thousand fans were reportedly turned away. According to newspaper accounts, the event set a new sports attendance and gate record in Bulgaria.)	Dan Koloff vs. Peter Ferestanoff	
—	Dan Koloff vs. Regis Siki; August 25, 1935	Sofia, Bulgaria	Yunak Stadium	25,000+ (Note: The exact attendance figure is unclear with various newspapers reporting numbers ranging from 25,000-30,000.)	Dan Koloff vs. Regis Siki	
—	Dan Koloff vs. Al Pereira; September 19, 1937	Sofia, Bulgaria	Yunak Stadium	25,000+	Dan Koloff vs. Al Pereira	
Salvadó	Stan Karolyi vs. Jose Tarres; September 24, 1949	Valencia, Spain	Plaza de Toros de Valencia	25,000	Stan Karolyi (c) vs. Jose Tarres for the World Mid-Heavyweight Championship	
Salvadó	Jose Tarres vs. Georges Freymond; July 30, 1949	Valencia, Spain	Plaza de Toros de Valencia	23,000	Jose Tarres (c) vs. Georges Freymond for the European Middleweight Championship	
Salvadó	Victorio Ochoa vs. Jose Tarres; August 14, 1948	Valencia, Spain	Plaza de Toros de Valencia	22,000	Victorio Ochoa (c) vs. Jose Tarres for the Spanish Middleweight Championship	
WWE	WWE SmackDown; June 18, 2005	Dublin, Ireland	Convention Centre Dublin	22,000	John Cena (c) vs. John Bradshaw Layfield vs. Kurt Angle in a three-way elimination match for the WWE Championship with special guest referee Steve Austin	
—	Magnus Bech-Olsen vs. Jess Pedersen; October 4, 1903	Charlottenlund, Denmark	Charlottenlund Racetrack	20,000	Magnus Bech-Olsen vs. Jess Pedersen	
Koloff-Stoeff	Dan Koloff vs. Charlie Santen; June 20, 1935	Sofia, Bulgaria	Yunak Stadium	20,000	Dan Koloff vs. Charlie Santen	
Koloff-Stoeff	Dan Koloff vs. Regis Siki; July 7, 1935	Sofia, Bulgaria	AS-23 Stadium	20,000 (Note: Several thousand fans were reportedly turned away at the July 7, 1935 show.)	Dan Koloff vs. Regis Siki	
—	Dan Koloff vs. Frank Bronowicz; June 7, 1936	Sofia, Bulgaria	Yunak Stadium	20,000	Dan Koloff vs. Frank Bronowicz	
—	Danno O'Mahoney vs. Rube Wright; August 9, 1936	Dublin, Ireland	Dalymount Park	20,000	Danno O'Mahoney vs. Rube Wright	
—	International Catch Show; July 1, 1962	Athens, Greece	Apostolos Nikolaidis Stadium	20,000	Andreas Lambrakis vs. The Masked Wrestler; Per the pre-match stipulation, if Lambrakis won his opponent would be forced to unmask	
Karpozilos	World Catch Festival; August 11, 1968	Athens, Greece	Apostolos Nikolaidis Stadium	20,000	Atilio vs. Theodoros Megaritis	
—	Kevin Ramsten vs. Theodoros Megaritis; June 6, 1971	Athens, Greece	Apostolos Nikolaidis Stadium	20,000	Kevin Ramsten (c) vs. Theodoros Megaritis for the European Heavyweight Championship	
Nikolarakos	Theodoros Megaritis vs. Di Bestia & Yousouf Osman; September 16, 1974	Athens, Greece	Apostolos Nikolaidis Stadium	20,000	Theodoros Megaritis vs. Di Bestia and Yousouf Osman in a handicap match	

== Historical ==
Top 10 most-attended shows prior to 1890s
No.	Promoter	Event	Location	Venue	Attendance	Main Event(s)	Ref.
1.	Rossignol-Rollin	Blas vs. Creste; September 16, 1855	Marseille, France	Hippodrome du Chateau des Fleurs	3,000 (Note: This may have been part of a series of matches between the two men at the venue which, according to newspaper accounts, "have enthralled 3,000 spectators for five weeks". The previous four shows may have also drawn 3,000 people, however, the September 16, 1855 match is the only known that is documented.)	“Pitiless” Blas vs. “The Bull of Provence” Creste	
2.	Rossignol-Rollin	Pujol vs. Creste; August 9, 1857	Marseille, France	Hippodrome du Chateau des Fleurs	2,000+ (Note: The exact attendance figure is unknown, however, the event is described as having "thousands of spectators in attendance".)	"The Colossus of Gironde" Pujol vs. “The Bull of Provence” Creste	
3.	Rossignol-Rollin	Belt of Nantes; February 15, 1857	Nantes, France	Manege Foucault	Unknown (Note: The exact attendance figure is unknown, however, both events are described as having a "large crowd".)	Belt of Nantes tournament	
3.	Rossignol-Rollin	Vincent vs. Creste; April 1, 1863	Nantes, France	Manege Foucault	Unknown	"The Iron Man" Vincent vs. "The Bull of Provence" Creste in a Revenge match	
4.	Rossignol-Rollin	Pujol vs. Marseille Sr. July 23, 1857	Marseille, France	Cirque Courtin	Unknown (Note: The exact attendance figure is unknown, however, both events are described as having a "large audience in attendance".)	"The Colossus of Gironde" Pujol vs. "The Tireless Miller of La Palud" Marseille Sr.	
4.	Rossignol-Rollin	Pujol vs. Marseille Sr. July 30, 1857	Marseille, France	Cirque Courtin	Unknown	Pujol (c-Bordeaux) vs. Marseille Sr. (c-Lyon) in a Champion vs. Champion match for the Belt of Bordeaux and Belt of Lyon	
5.	Rossignol-Rollin	October 26, 1857	Saint-Étienne, France	Salle de la Rotonde Saint-Charles	Unknown (Note: The exact attendance figure is unknown, however, the October 26, 1857 show is described as being "an immense success in terms of attendance". According to newspaper accounts, the December 1, 1862 show was "a complete monetary success".)		
5.	Rossignol-Rollin	Etienne vs. Vincent; December 1, 1862	Saint-Étienne, France	Salle de la Rotonde Saint-Charles	Unknown	"The Shepherd" Etienne vs. "The Iron Man" Vincent	
6.	Rossignol-Rollin	Etienne vs. Pujol; July 25, 1858	Marseille, France	Hippodrome du Chateau des Fleurs	Unknown (Note: The exact attendance figure is unknown, however, the events are described as having "many fans in attendance". According to newspaper accounts, the August 22, 1858 show had "a flood of spectators".)	"The Shepherd" Etienne vs. "The Colossus of Gironde" Pujol	
6.	Rossignol-Rollin	Etienne vs. Creste; August 22, 1858	Marseille, France	Hippodrome du Chateau des Fleurs	Unknown	"The Shepherd" Etienne vs. "The Bull of Provence" Creste	
6.	Rossignol-Rollin	July 28, 1861	Marseille, France	Hippodrome du Chateau des Fleurs	Unknown		
7.	Rossignol-Rollin	Etienne vs. Arpin; January 2, 1860	Chalon-sur-Saône, France	Salle du Colisee	Unknown (Note: The exact attendance figure is unknown, however, both events are described as being filled to capacity. According to newspaper accounts, the January 2, 1860 show "could barely contain the crowd".)	"The Shepherd" Etienne vs. "The Terrible Savoyard" Arpin	
7.	Rossignol-Rollin	100FF Open Challenge; December 9, 1861	Chalon-sur-Saône, France	Salle du Colisee	Unknown	Open challenge match to an amateur wrestler vs. a pro wrestler from the Rossignol-Rollin troupe for 100 francs	
8.	Rossignol-Rollin	August 1, 1865	Bordeaux, France	Salle de la rue Saint-Martin	Unknown (Note: The exact attendance figure is unknown, however, the event is described as having a "much larger crowd than the previous shows here".)		
9.	Rossignol-Rollin	Faouet vs. Marseille Jr. February 18, 1872	Lyon, France	L'Eldorado	Unknown (Note: The exact attendance figure is unknown, however, both events are described as having a "big crowd in attendance".)	"The Wildcat Wrestler" Faouet vs. Marseille Jr.	
9.	Rossignol-Rollin	Faouet vs. Ambroise; November 10, 1872	Lyon, France	L'Eldorado	Unknown	"The Wildcat Wrestler" Faouet vs. "The Colossus of Savoy" Ambroise	
10.	—	The Great Unknown vs. Jules Rigal; October 1874	Bucharest, Romania	Circus Suhr	Unknown (Note: The exact attendance figure is unknown, however, the event is described as being filled to capacity.)	"The Great Unknown" vs. Jules Rigal	

Top 10 most-attended shows in the 1890s
No.	Promotion	Event	Location	Venue	Attendance	Main Event(s)	Ref.
1.	—	Athens 1896; April 11, 1896	Athens, Greece	Panathenaic Stadium	55,000	Carl Schuhmann vs. Georgios Tsitas in the Men's Greco-Roman finals	
2.	FAB	Meuse International Championship Tournament (Day 3); August 22, 1899	Namur, Belgium	Namur Velodrome	12,000	Tournament finals for the Meuse International Heavyweight and Lightweight Championships	
3.	—	Magnus Bech-Olsen vs. Paul Pons; October 1, 1899	Charlottenlund, Denmark	Charlottenlund Racetrack	10,000+ (Note: The exact attendance figure is unclear with various newspapers reporting numbers ranging from 10,000 to 20,000.)	Magnus Bech-Olsen (c) vs. Paul Pons for the World Greco-Roman Heavyweight Championship	
3.	—	Carl Norbeck vs. Camillus Ewertsen; August 21, 1898	Oslo, Norway	Bygdøy Cycling Track	10,000+ (Note: The exact attendance figure is unclear with various newspapers reporting numbers ranging from 10,000 to 12,000. Pester Lloyd claimed attendance for the October 8, 1899 show was 25,000 while the Algemen Handelsblad reported it as "in excess of 30,000" and was for the Denmark Championship.)	Carl Norbeck vs. Camillus Ewertsen	
3.	—	Magnus Bech-Olsen vs. Paul Pons; October 8, 1899	Charlottenlund, Denmark	Charlottenlund Racetrack	10,000+	Magnus Bech-Olsen vs. Paul Pons	
4.	—	Auguste Robinnet vs. Antonio Pierri; September 3, 1893	Budapest, Austria-Hungary	Circus Salamonski Hippodrome	10,000	Auguste Robinnet vs. Antonio Pierri	
4.	—	Magnus Bech-Olsen vs. Mehmed Effendi; September 27, 1896	Copenhagen, Denmark	St. Thomas	10,000	Magnus Bech-Olsen vs. Mehmed Effendi	
4.	—	Antonio Pierri vs. Magnus Bech-Olsen; October 3, 1897	Ordrup, Denmark	Ordrup Velodrome	10,000	Antonio Pierri (c) vs. Magnus Bech-Olsen for the World Greco-Roman Championship	
4.	—	Magnus Bech-Olsen vs. Tom Cannon; June 5, 1898	Copenhagen, Denmark		10,000	Magnus Bech-Olsen vs. Tom Cannon	
4.	—	Carl Nordbeck vs. Camillus Ewersten; June 1898	Oslo, Norway	Bygdøy Cycling Track	10,000	Carl Nordbeck vs. Camillus Ewersten in a Best 2-out-of-3 Falls match	
4.	—	Magnus Bech-Olsen vs. Leon Masson; July 17, 1898	Charlottenlund, Denmark	Charlottenlund Racetrack	10,000	Magnus Bech-Olsen vs. Leon Masson in a Best 2-out-of-3 Falls match	
4.	—	Magnus Bech-Olsen vs. Heinrich Niemann & Camillus Ewersten; October 9, 1898	Charlottenlund, Denmark	Charlottenlund Racetrack	10,000	Magnus Bech-Olsen vs. Heinrich Niemann & Camillus Ewersten	
4.	FAB	Meuse International Championship Tournament (Day 1); August 20, 1899	Namur, Belgium	Namur Velodrome	10,000	Tournament for the Meuse International Heavyweight and Lightweight Championships	
4.	—	Constant le Boucher vs. Charles Fengler; August 27, 1899	Florennes, Belgium	Chateau de Beaufort	10,000	Constant le Boucher vs. Charles Fengler	
5.	—	Tom Cannon vs. Carl Abs; July 25, 1891	Berlin, Germany	American Theater	8,000+ (Note: The exact attendance figure is unclear with various newspapers reporting numbers ranging from 8,000-10,000.)	Tom Cannon (c) vs. Carl Abs in a Best 2-out-of-3 Falls match for the World Heavyweight Graeco-Roman Championship	
5.	—	Magnus Bech-Olsen vs. Tom Bradley; April 24, 1898	Charlottenlund, Denmark	Charlottenlund Racetrack	8,000+	Magnus Bech-Olsen vs. Tom Bradley	
6.	—	Tom Cannon vs. Carl Abs; July 30, 1891	Berlin, Germany	American Theater	8,000	Tom Cannon (c) vs. Carl Abs for the World Heavyweight Graeco-Roman Championship	
6.	—	Carl Nordbeck vs. Georg Rasso; August 1898	Christiania, Denmark		8,000	Carl Nordbeck vs. Georg Rasso	
7.	—	Antonio Pierri vs. Carl Abs; February 4, 1893	Hamburg, Germany	Flora Palace	7,000	Antonio Pierri vs. Carl Abs	
8.	—	Magnus Bech-Olsen vs. Antonio Pierri; September 26, 1897	Ordrup, Denmark	Ordrup Velodrome	6,000+ (Note: The exact attendance figure is unclear with various newspapers reporting numbers ranging from 6,000-10,000.)	Magnus Bech-Olsen vs. Antonio Pierri	
9.	FAB	Meuse International Championship Tournament (Day 2); August 21, 1899	Namur, Belgium	Namur Velodrome	6,000	Tournament for the Meuse International Heavyweight and Lightweight Championships	
10.	—	Magnus Bech-Olsen vs. Heinrich Niemann & Postümer; August 22, 1897	Ordrup, Denmark	Ordrup Velodrome	5,000+ (Note: The exact attendance figure is unclear with various newspapers reporting numbers ranging from 5,000-8,000.)	Magnus Bech-Olsen vs. Heinrich Niemann & Postümer in a Handicap match	
10.	—	Magnus Bech-Olsen vs. Tom Cannon; May 30, 1898	Charlottenlund, Denmark	Charlottenlund Racetrack	5,000+ (Note: The exact attendance figure is unclear with various newspapers reporting numbers ranging from 5,000-6,000.)	Magnus Bech-Olsen vs. Tom Cannon	
10.	—	Magnus Bech-Olsen vs. Charles Green; August 14, 1898	Charlottenlund, Denmark	Charlottenlund Racetrack	5,000+ (Note: The exact attendance figure is unclear with various newspapers reporting numbers ranging from 3,000-8,000. At least one German newspaper reported the attendance as 10,000.)	Magnus Bech-Olsen vs. Charles Green	

Top 10 most-attended shows in the 1900s
No.	Promotion	Event	Location	Venue	Attendance	Main Event(s)	Ref.
1.	—	Magnus Bech-Olsen vs. Jess Pedersen; October 4, 1903	Charlottenlund, Denmark	Charlottenlund Racetrack	20,000	Magnus Bech-Olsen vs. Jess Pedersen	
2.	—	Magnus Bech-Olsen vs. Ernest Roeber; September 16, 1900	Charlottenlund, Denmark	Charlottenlund Racetrack	15,000+ (Note: The exact attendance figure is unclear with various newspapers reporting numbers ranging from 10,000 to 16,000.)	Magnus Bech-Olsen (c) vs. Ernest Roeber for the World Greco-Roman Heavyweight Championship	
3.	—	Stanislaus Zbyszko vs. Dr. B.F. Roller; September 30, 1909	Vienna, Austro-Hungarian Empire		12,000	Stanislaus Zbyszko vs. Dr. B.F. Roller	
4.	—	Magnus Bech-Olsen vs. Nourlah; April 26, 1903	Charlottenlund, Denmark	Charlottenlund Racetrack	10,000+ (Note: The exact attendance figure is unclear with various newspapers reporting numbers ranging from 10,000 to 15,000.)	Magnus Bech-Olsen vs. Nourlah	
5.	—	Magnus Bech-Olsen vs. Dirk van den Berg; September 29, 1901	Charlottenlund, Denmark	Charlottenlund Racetrack	10,000	Magnus Bech-Olsen vs. Dirk van den Berg	
6.	—	Magnus Bech-Olsen vs. Ernest Roeber; September 23, 1900	Charlottenlund, Denmark	Charlottenlund Racetrack	8,000+ (Note: The exact attendance figure is unclear with various newspapers reporting numbers ranging from 8,000-15,000.)	Magnus Bech-Olsen (c) vs. Ernest Roeber for the World Greco-Roman Heavyweight Championship	
6.	—	Magnus Bech-Olsen vs. Paul Belling; August 12, 1900	Charlottenlund, Denmark	Charlottenlund Racetrack	8,000+	Magnus Bech-Olsen vs. Paul Belling	
7.	—	Nourlah vs. Kara Ahmed; February 4, 1900	Paris, France	Salle Wagram	6,000+ (Note: The exact attendance figure is unknown, however, the event is described as having "more than 6,000 fans", however, this claim may be exaggerated.)	Nourlah vs. Kara Ahmed	
7.	—	Gullam vs. Court-Dereli; August 12, 1900	Paris, France	Hippodrome de Montmartre	6,000	Gullam vs. Court-Dereli	
7.	—	European Championship Tournament (Final Day); April 28, 1905	Paris, France	Hippodrome de Montmartre	6,000+	European Championship tournament finals	
8.	—	Magnus Bech-Olsen vs. George Hackenschmidt; September 20, 1903	Charlottenlund, Denmark	Charlottenlund Racetrack	4,000+ (Note: The exact attendance figure is unclear with various newspapers reporting numbers ranging from 4,000-5,000.)	Magnus Bech-Olsen vs. George Hackenschmidt	
9.	—	Jakob Koch vs. Omer De Bouillon; January 18, 1904	Copenhagen, Denmark	Arena-Theatre	4,000	Jakob Koch vs. Omer De Bouillon	
10.	—	Magnus Bech-Olsen vs. Jess Pedersen; October 2, 1904	Copenhagen, Denmark	Østerbro Stadium	3,000+ (Note: The exact attendance figure is unclear with various newspapers reporting numbers ranging from 3,000-5,000. At least one German newspaper reported the attendance as 20,000 and may have taken place at the Charlottenlund Racetrack.)	Magnus Bech-Olsen vs. Jess Pedersen	
10.	—	Magnus Bech-Olsen vs. Carl Norbeck; July 16, 1905	Bergen, Norway	Bergen Racetrack	3,000+ (Note: The exact attendance figure is unclear with various newspapers reporting numbers ranging from 2,500-6,000.)	Magnus Bech-Olsen vs. Carl Norbeck	

Top 10 most-attended shows in the 1910s
No.	Promoter	Event	Location	Venue	Attendance	Main Event(s)	Ref.
1.	—	Stanislaus Zbyszko vs. Georg Lurich; July 2, 1913	Vienna, Austro-Hungarian Empire	Kaisergarten	20,000? (Note: There are different reports on the attendance of the event with numbers ranging from 4,000 to as high as 20,000.)	Stanislaus Zbyszko vs. Georg Lurich	
2.	—	Gustav Fristensky vs. Josef Smejkal; June 1, 1913	Prague, Austro-Hungarian Empire	Slavia-Place	7,000	Gustav Fristensky vs. Josef Smejkal	
3.	—	Wladek Zbyszko vs. John Lemm; July 16, 1911	Davos, Switzerland	Davos Skating Rink	5,000	Wladek Zbyszko vs. John Lemm	
3.	—	Gustav Fristensky vs. Georg Lurich; August 24, 1913	Prague, Austro-Hungarian Empire	Slavia-Place	5,000	Gustav Fristensky vs. Georg Lurich	
3.	—	Gustav Fristensky vs. Georg Lurich; August 30, 1913	Prague, Austro-Hungarian Empire	Slavia-Place	5,000	Gustav Fristensky vs. Georg Lurich in a Revenge match	
4.	—	Stanislaus Zbyszko vs. Gustav Fristensky; July 16, 1913	Vienna, Austro-Hungarian Empire	Kaisergarten	4,000	Stanislaus Zbyszko vs. Gustav Fristensky	
4.	—	Georg Lurich vs. Heinrich Eberle; August 15, 1913	Prague, Austro-Hungarian Empire	Slavia-Place	4,000	Georg Lurich vs. Heinrich Eberle	
5.	—	Georg Lurich vs. Gustav Fristensky; July 27, 1913	Pilsen, Austro-Hungarian Empire	Waldek-Saal	3,000	Georg Lurich vs. Gustav Fristensky	
6.	—	Stanislaus Zbyszko vs. Heinrich Eberle; July 29, 1913	Vienna, Austro-Hungarian Empire	Kaisergarten	1,000	Stanislaus Zbyszko vs. Heinrich Eberle for the World Heavyweight Championship	
7.	—	European Heavyweight Graeco-Roman Championship Tournament; August 30, 1912	Dortmund, Germany	Olympia-Theatre	Unknown (Note: The exact attendance figure is unknown, however, the event is described as having a "huge crowd". According to newspaper accounts, the show was "one of the biggest crowds in the history of the Olympia-Theatre".)	Hans Schwarz Sr. vs. Josef Smejkal	
8.	—	Grand Prix of Baden (Day 3); July 3, 1910	Freiburg, Germany	Colosseum-Theatre	Unknown (Note: The exact attendance figure is unknown, however, the event is described as a "sellout".)	Grand Prix of Baden tournament	
8.	—	Grand Prix of Baden (Day 7); July 7, 1910	Freiburg, Germany	Colosseum-Theatre	Unknown	Grand Prix of Baden tournament	
8.	—	Grand Prix of Baden (Day 9); July 9, 1910	Freiburg, Germany	Colosseum-Theatre	Unknown	Grand Prix of Baden tournament	
8.	—	Grand Prix of Baden (Day 15); July 15, 1910	Freiburg, Germany	Colosseum-Theatre	Unknown	Grand Prix of Baden tournament	
8.	—	Grand Prix of Baden (Day 17); July 10, 1910	Freiburg, Germany	Colosseum-Theatre	Unknown	Grand Prix of Baden tournament	
8.	—	Grand Prix of Baden (Day 22); July 22, 1910	Freiburg, Germany	Colosseum-Theatre	Unknown	Grand Prix of Baden tournament	
8.	—	Grand Prix of Baden (Day 27); July 28, 1910	Freiburg, Germany	Colosseum-Theatre	Unknown	Grand Prix of Baden tournament	
8.	—	Grand Prix of Baden (Day 8); June 23, 1911	Freiburg, Germany	Colosseum-Theatre	Unknown	Grand Prix of Baden Graeco-Roman tournament	
8.	—	Grand Prix of Baden (Day 9); June 24, 1911	Freiburg, Germany	Colosseum-Theatre	Unknown	Grand Prix of Baden Graeco-Roman tournament	
8.	—	South German Graeco-Roman Championship Tournament (Day 4); July 20, 1912	Freiburg, Germany	Colosseum-Theatre	Unknown	South German Graeco-Roman Championship tournament	
8.	—	South German Graeco-Roman Championship Tournament (Day 5); July 21, 1912	Freiburg, Germany	Colosseum-Theatre	Unknown	South German Graeco-Roman Championship tournament	
8.	—	South German Graeco-Roman Championship Tournament (Day 12); July 28, 1912	Freiburg, Germany	Colosseum-Theatre	Unknown	South German Graeco-Roman Championship tournament	
8.	—	South German Graeco-Roman Championship Tournament (Final Day); August 7, 1912	Freiburg, Germany	Colosseum-Theatre	Unknown	South German Graeco-Roman Championship tournament	
9.	—	Austrian Graeco-Roman Championship Tournament (Day 2); September 4, 1910	Innsbruck, Austro-Hungarian Empire	Bierwastl	Unknown	Austrian Graeco-Roman Championship tournament	
10.	Harry van der Heyden	Bohemian Graeco-Roman Championship Tournament (Day 12); April 12, 1913	Prague, Austro-Hungarian Empire	Tichy's Theatre-Varieté	Unknown	Bohemian Graeco-Roman Championship tournament	
10.	Harry van der Heyden	Bohemian Graeco-Roman Championship Tournament (Day 15); April 15, 1913	Prague, Austro-Hungarian Empire	Tichy's Theatre-Varieté	Unknown	Bohemian Graeco-Roman Championship tournament	
10.	Harry van der Heyden	Bohemian Graeco-Roman Championship Tournament (Day 17); April 17, 1913	Prague, Austro-Hungarian Empire	Tichy's Theatre-Varieté	Unknown	Bohemian Graeco-Roman Championship tournament	
10.	Harry van der Heyden	Bohemian Graeco-Roman Championship Tournament (Day 29); April 29, 1913	Prague, Austro-Hungarian Empire	Tichy's Theatre-Varieté	Unknown	Bohemian Graeco-Roman Championship tournament	
10.	Harry van der Heyden	Bohemian Graeco-Roman Championship Tournament (Final Day); May 6, 1913	Prague, Austro-Hungarian Empire	Tichy's Theatre-Varieté	Unknown	Bohemian Graeco-Roman Championship tournament	

Top 5 most-attended shows in the 1920s (Note: There is a lack of documentation due to the aftermath of World War I.)
No.	Promotion	Event	Location	Venue	Attendance	Main Event(s)	Ref.
1.	—	Jim Londos vs. Karl Zybszko; December 9, 1928	Athens, Greece	Panathenaic Stadium	65,000	Jim Londos vs. Karl Zybszko	
2.	—	Gino Garibaldi vs. Colonel Kobolo; 1927	Trieste, Italy		50,000	Gino Garibaldi vs. Colonel Kobolo	
3.	—	Jim Londos vs. Karol Zbyszko; December 2, 1928	Athens, Greece	Panathenaic Stadium	40,000+	Jim Londos vs. Karol Zbyszko	
4.	—	Jim Londos vs. Dimitrios Tofalos; December 16, 1928	Argos, Greece		12,000	Jim Londos vs. Dimitrios Tofalos	
5.	—	Gustav Fristensky vs. Alexander Garkawienko; March 1, 1923	Prague, Czechoslovakia	Cinema Lucerna	5,000	Gustav Fristensky vs. Alexander Garkawienko	

Top 10 most-attended shows in the 1930s
No.	Promotion	Event	Location	Venue	Attendance	Main Event(s)	Ref.
1.	—	Jim Londos vs. Kola Kwariani; October 22, 1933	Athens, Greece	Panathenaic Stadium	60,000+	Jim Londos vs. Kola Kwariani for the World Heavyweight Championship with special referee George Tragos	
2.	—	Jim Londos vs. Johannes van der Walt; July 25, 1937	Athens, Greece	Panathenaic Stadium	50,000+	Jim Londos vs. Johannes van der Walt	
2.	—	Jim Londos vs. Dinarli Mehmed; August 2, 1936	Athens, Greece	Panathenaic Stadium	50,000+	Jim Londos vs. Dinarli Mehmed	
3.	—	Jim Londos vs. Kola Kwariani; September 30, 1933	Athens, Greece	Panathenaic Stadium	50,000	Jim Londos vs. Kola Kwariani for the World Heavyweight Championship	
4.	—	Dan Koloff vs. Peter Ferestanoff; September 8, 1935	Sofia, Bulgaria	Yunak Stadium	30,000	Dan Koloff vs. Peter Ferestanoff	
5.	—	Dan Koloff vs. Regis Siki; August 25, 1935	Sofia, Bulgaria	Yunak Stadium	25,000+	Dan Koloff vs. Regis Siki	
5.	—	Dan Koloff vs. Al Pereira; September 19, 1937	Sofia, Bulgaria	Yunak Stadium	25,000+	Dan Koloff vs. Al Pereira	
6.	Koloff-Stoeff	Dan Koloff vs. Charlie Santen; June 20, 1935	Sofia, Bulgaria	Yunak Stadium	20,000	Dan Koloff vs. Charlie Santen	
6.	Koloff-Stoeff	Dan Koloff vs. Regis Siki; July 7, 1935	Sofia, Bulgaria	AS-23 Stadium	20,000	Dan Koloff vs. Regis Siki	
6.	—	Dan Koloff vs. Frank Bronowicz; June 7, 1936	Sofia, Bulgaria	Yunak Stadium	20,000	Dan Koloff vs. Frank Bronowicz	
6.	—	Danno O'Mahoney vs. Rube Wright; August 9, 1936	Dublin, Ireland	Dalymount Park	20,000	Danno O'Mahoney vs. Rube Wright	
7.	FFCP	Dan Koloff vs. Charles Rigoulot; January 22, 1934	Paris, France	Palais des Sports	18,000	Dan Koloff vs. Charles Rigoulot	
8.	—	Danno O'Mahoney vs. Steve Casey; August 26, 1938	Milltown, Ireland		16,000	Danno O'Mahoney vs. Steve Casey	
9.	FFCP	Dan Koloff vs. Henri Deglane; November 20, 1933	Paris, France	Palais des Sports	15,000 (Note: The June 21, 1936 show set a new attendance record for the city of Plovdiv, Bulgaria.)	Dan Koloff vs. Henri Deglane	
9.	FFCP	Henri Deglane vs. Charlie Santen; January 8, 1934	Paris, France	Palais des Sports	15,000	Henri Deglane vs. Charlie Santen	
9.	FFCP	Henri Deglane vs. Ed "Strangler" Lewis; December 3, 1934	Paris, France	Palais des Sports	15,000	Henri Deglane vs. Ed "Strangler" Lewis	
9.	—	Dan Koloff vs. Frank Bronowicz; June 21, 1936	Plovdiv, Bulgaria	Levski Stadium	15,000	Dan Koloff vs. Frank Bronowicz	
9.	—	John Maxos vs. Dinarli Mehmed; September 27, 1936	Thessaloniki, Greece	Iraklis F.C. Stadium	15,000	John Maxos vs. Dinarli Mehmed	
10.	FFCP	Henri Deglane vs. Sailor Arnold; October 10, 1933	Paris, France	Palais des Sports	12,000	Henri Deglane vs. Sailor Arnold	
10.	FFCP	Dan Koloff vs. Youssef Mahamut; December 4, 1933	Paris, France	Palais des Sports	12,000	Dan Koloff vs. Youssef Mahamut	

Top 10 most-attended shows in the 1940s
No.	Promotion	Event	Location	Venue	Attendance	Main Event(s)	Ref.
1.	Salvadó	Stan Karolyi vs. Jose Tarres; September 24, 1949	Valencia, Spain	Plaza de Toros de Valencia	25,000	Stan Karolyi (c) vs. Jose Tarres for the World Mid-Heavyweight Championship	
2.	Salvadó	Jose Tarres vs. Georges Freymond; July 30, 1949	Valencia, Spain	Plaza de Toros de Valencia	23,000	Jose Tarres (c) vs. Georges Freymond for the European Middleweight Championship	
3.	Salvadó	Victorio Ochoa vs. Jose Tarres; August 14, 1948	Valencia, Spain	Plaza de Toros de Valencia	22,000	Victorio Ochoa (c) vs. Jose Tarres for the Spanish Middleweight Championship	
4.	—	Jack Dale vs. Jose Tarres; August 20, 1948	Barcelona, Spain	Plaza de Toros de las Arenas	14,800+ (Note: The exact attendance figure is unknown, however, the event is described as being full. The venue had a seating capacity of 14,893 or more. According to newspaper accounts, the December 5, 1948 show was "packed to the top".)	Jack Dale (c) vs. Jose Tarres for the European Middleweight Championship	
4.	—	El Angel vs. Gregorio Jarque; December 5, 1948	Barcelona, Spain	Plaza de Toros de las Arenas	14,800+	El Angel vs. Gregorio Jarque	
5.	EB	Dr. Grailet vs. Gross Jean; July 28, 1949	Barcelona, Spain	Plaza de Toros de las Arenas	14,000+ (Note: The exact attendance figure is unknown, however, the event is described as being "almost full". The venue had a seating capacity of 14,893 or more.)	Dr. Grailet vs. Gross Jean	
6.	—	Andreas Lambrakis vs. Paraschos Boras; September 21, 1945	Thessaloniki, Greece	PAOK Stadium	12,000	Andreas Lambrakis vs. Paraschos Boras	
6.	—	Harry Karpozilos vs. Nicko Mexis; October 12, 1947	Athens, Greece	Apostolos Nikolaidis Stadium	12,000	Harry Karpozilos vs. Nicko Mexis	
6.	—	Harry Karpozilos vs. Kasim Aslan; September 5, 1948	Thessaloniki, Greece	PAOK Stadium	12,000	Harry Karpozilos vs. Kasim Aslan	
6.	IBL	Freestyle Tournament (Day 15); January 29, 1949	Vienna, Austria	SC Wacker Stadium	12,000	17-man Freestyle wrestling tournament	
7.	—	Andreas Lambrakis vs. Meintanis; October 15, 1945	Thessaloniki, Greece	PAOK Stadium	10,000	Andreas Lambrakis vs. Meintanis	
7.	IBL	Adi Berber vs. Georg Blemenschitz; May 29, 1947	Vienna, Austria	Heumarkt	10,000	Adi Berber vs. Georg Blemenschitz	
7.	IBL	Adi Berber vs. Nino Equatore; June 19, 1947	Vienna, Austria	Heumarkt	10,000	Adi Berber vs. Nino Equatore	
7.	IBL	Adi Berber vs. Herbert Audersch; June 24, 1947	Vienna, Austria	Heumarkt	10,000	Adi Berber vs. Herbert Audersch	
7.	IBL	Adi Berber vs. Nino Equatore; June 25, 1947	Vienna, Austria	Heumarkt	10,000	Adi Berber vs. Nino Equatore	
7.	—	Harry Karpozilos vs. Kasim Aslan; August 29, 1948	Thessaloniki, Greece	PAOK Stadium	10,000	Harry Karpozilos vs. Kasim Aslan	
8.	—	Peter Ferestanoff vs. Jon Draghiceanu; June 22, 1941	Sofia, Bulgaria	Yunak Stadium	8,000	Peter Ferestanoff vs. Jon Draghiceanu	
8.	—	Andreas Lambrakis vs. Harry Karpozilos; July 30, 1945	Thessaloniki, Greece	PAOK Stadium	8,000	Andreas Lambrakis vs. Harry Karpozilos	
8.	Keller-Grüneisen	Yvar Martinson vs. Axel Cadier; May 12, 1948	Zürich, Switzerland	Hallenstadion	8,000	Yvar Martinson (c) vs. Axel Cadier for the European Heavyweight Championship	
8.	Keller-Grüneisen	Yvar Martinson vs. Henri Deglane; June 2, 1948	Zürich, Switzerland	Hallenstadion	8,000	Yvar Martinson (c) vs. Henri Deglane for the European Heavyweight Championship	
8.	Keller-Grüneisen	Yvar Martinson vs. Felix Miquet; November 30, 1949	Zürich, Switzerland	Hallenstadion	8,000	Yvar Martinson vs. Felix Miquet	
9.	IBL	Herbert Audersch vs. Václav Janák; May 27, 1947	Vienna, Austria	Heumarkt	7,500	Herbert Audersch vs. Václav Janák	
10.	EODA	Victorio Ochoa vs. Tomas Grau; June 18, 1946	Barcelona, Spain	Plaza de Toros de las Arenas	Unknown (Note: The exact attendance figure is unknown, however, the event is described as having "excellent" or "very good attendance". The venue had a seating capacity of 14,893 or more. According to newspaper accounts, the June 18 and July 7, 1946 shows had "quite a large crowd" and the November 28, 1948 show was "overcrowded".)	Victorio Ochoa vs. Tomas Grau	
10.	EODA	Gras vs. Tomas Grau; July 7, 1946	Barcelona, Spain	Plaza de Toros de las Arenas	Unknown	Gras vs. Tomas Grau	
10.	EODA	Gras vs. Joaquin Saludes; July 9, 1946	Barcelona, Spain	Plaza de Toros de las Arenas	Unknown	Gras vs. Joaquin Saludes	
10.	EB	Dr. Grailet vs. Flaviano; August 4, 1949	Barcelona, Spain	Plaza de Toros de las Arenas	Unknown	Dr. Grailet vs. Flaviano	
10.	EB	Dr. Grailet vs. Joaquin Saludes; August 18, 1949	Barcelona, Spain	Plaza de Toros de las Arenas	Unknown	Dr. Grailet vs. Joaquin Saludes	
10.	EB	Paul Leteurtrois vs. Carvajal; August 25, 1949	Barcelona, Spain	Plaza de Toros de las Arenas	Unknown	Paul Leteurtrois vs. Carvajal	
10.	EB	Dr. Grailet vs. Joaquin Saludes; September 1, 1949	Barcelona, Spain	Plaza de Toros de las Arenas	Unknown	Dr. Grailet vs. Joaquin Saludes	
10.	EB	Dr. Grailet vs. Paul Leteurtrois; September 8, 1949	Barcelona, Spain	Plaza de Toros de las Arenas	Unknown	Dr. Grailet vs. Paul Leteurtrois	
10.	EB	Paul Leteurtrois vs. Joaquin Saludes; September 15, 1949	Barcelona, Spain	Plaza de Toros de las Arenas	Unknown	Paul Leteurtrois vs. Joaquin Saludes	
10.	—	Tabola vs. Jo Baratte; November 28, 1948	Barcelona, Spain	Plaza de Toros de las Arenas	Unknown	Tabola vs. Jo Baratte	

Top 10 most-attended shows in the 1950s
No.	Promotion	Event	Location	Venue	Attendance	Main Event(s)	Ref.
1.	—	Jim Londos vs. Jim Wright; October 3, 1956	Athens, Greece	Panathenaic Stadium	40,000	Jim Londos vs. Jim Wright	
2.	—	Rafvela vs. Felix Lamban; August 24, 1957	Madrid, Spain	Estadio Metropolitano	35,000+	Rafvela vs. Felix Lamban in a 10-minute Challenge match for 20,000 pesetas	
3.	—	Jose Tarres vs. Felix Lamban; September 2, 1951	Barcelona, Spain	Plaza de Toros Monumental	19,500+ (Note: The exact attendance figure is unknown, however, the event is described as being full. The venue had a seating capacity of 19,582.)	Jose Tarres vs. Felix Lamban	
3.	—	Victorio Ochoa vs. Stan Karolyi; September 16, 1951	Barcelona, Spain	Plaza de Toros Monumental	19,500+	Victorio Ochoa vs. Stan Karolyi	
4.	—	Felix Lamban vs. Campo; July 29, 1951	Barcelona, Spain	Plaza de Toros Monumental	19,000+ (Note: The exact attendance figure is unknown, however, the event is described as being "almost full". The venue had a seating capacity of 19,582.)	Felix Lamban vs. Campo	
4.	—	Felix Lamban vs. Jean Benoy; June 22, 1952	Barcelona, Spain	Plaza de Toros Monumental	19,000+	Felix Lamban vs. Jean Benoy	
4.	—	Victorio Ochoa vs. Jose Tarres; June 29, 1952	Barcelona, Spain	Plaza de Toros Monumental	19,000+	Victorio Ochoa vs. Jose Tarres	
5.	—	Andreas Lambrakis vs. Harry Karpozilos; June 29, 1955	Athens, Greece	Apostolos Nikolaidis Stadium	18,000	Andreas Lambrakis vs. Harry Karpozilos	
5.	—	Jim Londos vs. Elias Panagos; October 7, 1956	Argos, Greece		18,000	Jim Londos vs. Elias Panagos	
6.	FFCP	Frank Sexton vs. Yvar Martinson; January 9, 1950	Paris, France	Palais des Sports	15,000	Frank Sexton (c) vs. Yvar Martinson for the AWA World Heavyweight Championship	
7.	—	Felix Lamban vs. Claude Montourcy; July 31, 1951	Barcelona, Spain	Plaza de Toros de las Arenas	14,800+ (Note: The exact attendance figure is unknown, however, the event is described as being full. The venue had a seating capacity of 14,893. According to newspaper accounts, the August 14, 1951 show was "the biggest crowd of the season so far".)	Felix Lamban vs. Claude Montourcy	
7.	—	Felix Lamban vs. Stan Karolyi; August 14, 1951	Barcelona, Spain	Plaza de Toros de las Arenas	14,800+	Felix Lamban vs. Stan Karolyi	
7.	—	Felix Lamban vs. Claude Montourcy; August 21, 1951	Barcelona, Spain	Plaza de Toros de las Arenas	14,800+	Felix Lamban vs. Claude Montourcy	
7.	—	Jean Benoy vs. Jim Oliver; August 5, 1952	Barcelona, Spain	Plaza de Toros de las Arenas	14,800+	Jean Benoy vs. Jim Oliver	
7.	—	Felix Lamban vs. Gilles Waclis; August 12, 1952	Barcelona, Spain	Plaza de Toros de las Arenas	14,800+	Felix Lamban vs. Gilles Waclis	
8.	—	Felix Lamban vs. Jules Delmee; July 1, 1952	Barcelona, Spain	Plaza de Toros de las Arenas	14,000+ (Note: The exact attendance figure is unknown, however, the event is described as being "almost completely full". The venue had a seating capacity of 14,893.)	Felix Lamban vs. Jules Delmee	
9.	FFCP	Frank Sexton vs. Yvar Martinson; January 8, 1951	Paris, France	Palais des Sports	12,000	Frank Sexton (c) vs. Yvar Martinson for the AWA World Heavyweight Championship	
9.	—	Andreas Lambrakis vs. Ali Ahmet; January 19, 1955	Thessaloniki, Greece	PAOK Stadium	12,000	Andreas Lambrakis vs. Ali Ahmet	
9.	—	Andreas Lambrakis vs. Abel Cestac; May 24, 1956	Athens, Greece	Apostolos Nikolaidis Stadium	12,000	Andreas Lambrakis vs. Abel Cestac	
10.	Keller-Grüneisen	Frank Sexton vs. Yvar Martinson; February 3, 1950	Zürich, Switzerland	Hallenstadion	11,000	Frank Sexton (c) vs. Yvar Martinson for the AWA World Heavyweight Championship	

Top 10 most-attended shows in the 1960s
No.	Promotion	Event	Location	Venue	Attendance	Main Event(s)	Ref.
1.	—	International Catch Show; July 1, 1962	Athens, Greece	Apostolos Nikolaidis Stadium	20,000	Andreas Lambrakis vs. The Masked Wrestler; Per the pre-match stipulation, if Lambrakis won his opponent would be forced to unmask	
1.	Karpozilos	World Catch Festival; August 11, 1968	Athens, Greece	Apostolos Nikolaidis Stadium	20,000	Atilio vs. Theodoros Megaritis	
2.	—	Andreas Lambrakis & Kostas Papalazarou vs. Abel Cestac & Nicolai Zigulinoff; August 3, 1961	Athens, Greece	Apostolos Nikolaidis Stadium	15,000	Andreas Lambrakis and Kostas Papalazarou vs. Abel Cestac and Nicolai Zigulinoff	
2.	—	International Catch Festival; May 26, 1965	Athens, Greece	Nea Smyrni Stadium	15,000	Andreas Lambrakis vs. The Hunchback	
2.	—	World Catch Festival; March 30, 1965	Athens, Greece	Apostolos Nikolaidis Stadium	15,000	Spiros Arion vs. Ski Hi Lee	
2.	—	World Catch Festival; June 6, 1965	Athens, Greece	Apostolos Nikolaidis Stadium	15,000	George Korienko vs. The Zebra Kid	
2.	Karpozilos	World Catch Festival; August 4, 1968	Athens, Greece	Apostolos Nikolaidis Stadium	15,000	Atilio vs. Kostas Papalazarou	
2.	Karpozilos	World Catch Festival; June 1, 1969	Athens, Greece	Apostolos Nikolaidis Stadium	15,000	George Korienko and El Bizeni vs. Kostas Papalazarou and Stefanidis	
3.	—	Andreas Lambrakis & Dimitris Karystinos vs. Josef Kovacs & Alberto Amessa; June 1, 1962	Athens, Greece	Apostolos Nikolaidis Stadium	12,000	Andreas Lambrakis and Dimitris Karystinos vs. Josef Kovacs and Alberto Amessa	
3.	Karpozilos	World Catch Festival; August 3, 1969	Athens, Greece	Apostolos Nikolaidis Stadium	12,000	Spiros Arion vs. George Korienko	
4.	—	Andreas Lambrakis & Kostas Papalazarou vs. Felix Miquet & Yvar Martinson; June 2, 1961	Athens, Greece	Apostolos Nikolaidis Stadium	10,000	Andreas Lambrakis and Kostas Papalazarou vs. Felix Miquet and Yvar Martinson	
4.	—	Andreas Lambrakis & Kostas Papalazarou vs. Felix Miquet & Yvar Martinson; June 22, 1961	Athens, Greece	Apostolos Nikolaidis Stadium	10,000	Andreas Lambrakis and Kostas Papalazarou vs. Felix Miquet and Yvar Martinson	
4.	—	World Catch Festival; June 24, 1964	Athens, Greece	Nikos Goumas Stadium	10,000	Dimitris Karystinos vs. Jimmy Dula	
4.	—	World Catch Festival; June 28, 1964	Athens, Greece	Nikos Goumas Stadium	10,000	Kostas Nathaniel vs. Warnia de Zarzecki	
4.	—	World Catch Festival; August 9, 1964	Athens, Greece	Nikos Goumas Stadium	10,000	Kostas Nathaniel vs. The Monster	
4.	—	World Catch Festival; August 30, 1964	Athens, Greece	Nikos Goumas Stadium	10,000	Kostas Nathaniel vs. The Monster	
4.	—	World Catch Festival; May 16, 1965	Athens, Greece	Apostolos Nikolaidis Stadium	10,000	George Korienko vs. The Zebra Kid	
4.	Karpozilos	World Catch Festival; August 18, 1968	Athens, Greece	Apostolos Nikolaidis Stadium	10,000	Atilio vs. Giorgos Bouranis	
4.	Karpozilos	World Catch Festival; September 2, 1968	Athens, Greece	Apostolos Nikolaidis Stadium	10,000	Atilio vs. Kostas Papalazarou	
4.	Karpozilos	World Catch Festival; July 20, 1969	Athens, Greece	Apostolos Nikolaidis Stadium	10,000	Spiros Arion vs. George Korienko	
4.	Karpozilos	World Catch Festival; July 27, 1969	Athens, Greece	Apostolos Nikolaidis Stadium	10,000	Kostas Papalazarou vs. George Korienko	
4.	Karpozilos	World Catch Festival; August 10, 1969	Athens, Greece	Apostolos Nikolaidis Stadium	10,000	Spiros Arion vs. George Korienko in a Steel Cage match	
4.	Nikolarakos	Pan-European Championship in Wrestling; August 10, 1969	Athens, Greece	Stavros Mavrothalassitis Stadium	10,000	Giorgos Bouranis vs. Rasputin	
4.	Nikolarakos	Pan-European Championship in Wrestling; August 17, 1969	Athens, Greece	Stavros Mavrothalassitis Stadium	10,000	Atilio vs. Rasputin	
4.	Nikolarakos	Pan-European Championship in Wrestling; August 24, 1969	Athens, Greece	Stavros Mavrothalassitis Stadium	10,000	Atilio vs. Rasputin	
5.	VABÖ	Georg Blemenschütz & Erich Koltschak vs. Francois Miquet & Adi Porizek; June 1962	Vienna, Austria	Heumarkt	9,000	Georg Blemenschütz and Erich Koltschak vs. Francois Miquet and Adi Porizek	
5.	VABÖ	Georg Blemenschütz & Erich Koltschak vs. José Arroyo & Josef Kovacs; July 1962	Vienna, Austria	Heumarkt	9,000	Georg Blemenschütz and Erich Koltschak vs. José Arroyo and Josef Kovacs	
6.	EI	Rafael Blasco vs. Kiyomigawa; July 27, 1962	Murcia, Spain	Plaza de Toros de Murcia	Unknown (Note: The exact attendance figure is unknown, however, the event is described as having a "large number of fans". The venue had a seating capacity of 15,000 or more.)	Rafael Blasco vs. Kiyomigawa	
7.	EI	The Pizarro Brothers vs. Inca Peruano & El Bulldog; August 3, 1962	Murcia, Spain	Plaza de Toros de Murcia	Unknown (Note: The exact attendance figure is unknown, however, the event is described as having a "magnificent attendance". The venue had a seating capacity of 15,000 or more.)	The Pizarro Brothers (Julian Pizarro & Nino Pizarro) vs. Inca Peruano & El Bulldog	
8.	EI	Jose Marques vs. Gran Amenaza; July 19, 1962	Murcia, Spain	Plaza de Toros de Murcia	Unknown (Note: The exact attendance figure is unknown, however, the event is described as having a "big crowd". The venue had a seating capacity of 15,000 or more.)	Jose Marques vs. Gran Amenaza	
8.	EI	Rafael Blasco vs. Kamikaze; June 27, 1963	Murcia, Spain	Plaza de Toros de Murcia	Unknown	Rafael Blasco vs. Kamikaze	
8.	EI	Torneo Relampago; June 11, 1964	Murcia, Spain	Plaza de Toros de Murcia	Unknown	Torneo Relampago tournament finals	
8.	EI	Jose Marques vs. Al Hayes; June 25, 1964	Murcia, Spain	Plaza de Toros de Murcia	Unknown	Jose Marques vs. Al Hayes	
8.	EI	Nino Pizarro & Lucon vs. Juan Manuel & Luis Pont; July 3, 1965	Murcia, Spain	Plaza de Toros de Murcia	Unknown	Nino Pizarro & Lucon vs. Juan Manuel & Luis Pont	
8.	EI	The Pizarro Brothers vs. Steve Haggetty & Reg Trood; August 21, 1965	Murcia, Spain	Plaza de Toros de Murcia	Unknown	The Pizarro Brothers (Julian Pizarro & Nino Pizarro) vs. Steve Haggetty & Reg Trood	
9.	EI	Nino Pizarro vs. Gilbert Cesca; June 18, 1964	Murcia, Spain	Plaza de Toros de Murcia	Unknown (Note: The exact attendance figure is unknown, however, the event is described as having "quite an influx" of fans. The venue had a seating capacity of 15,000 or more.)	Nino Pizarro vs. Gilbert Cesca	
9.	EI	Rafael Blasco vs. Dave Larsen; June 18, 1966	Murcia, Spain	Plaza de Toros de Murcia	Unknown	Rafael Blasco vs. Dave Larsen	
9.	EI	Torneo Relampago; June 25, 1966	Murcia, Spain	Plaza de Toros de Murcia	Unknown	Torneo Relampago tournament finals	
9.	EI	Jose Marques & Julian Pizarro vs. El Bulldog & Dick Medrano; July 2, 1966	Murcia, Spain	Plaza de Toros de Murcia	Unknown	Jose Marques & Julian Pizarro vs. El Bulldog & Dick Medrano	
9.	EI	Jose Marques & Antonio Montoro vs. Hans Schnabel & Felix Gregor; July 4, 1968	Murcia, Spain	Plaza de Toros de Murcia	Unknown	Jose Marques & Antonio Montoro vs. Hans Schnabel & Felix Gregor	
10.	EI	Jose Marques & Modesto Aledo vs. Tito Kopa & Pancho Badia; June 24, 1967	Murcia, Spain	Plaza de Toros de Murcia	Unknown (Note: The exact attendance figure is unknown, however, the event is described as having "lots of fans in the stands". The venue had a seating capacity of 15,000 or more.)	Jose Marques & Modesto Aledo vs. Tito Kopa & Pancho Badia	

Top 10 most-attended shows in the 1970s
No.	Promotion	Event	Location	Venue	Attendance	Main Event(s)	Ref.
1.	—	Kevin Ramsten vs. Theodoros Megaritis; June 6, 1971	Athens, Greece	Apostolos Nikolaidis Stadium	20,000	Kevin Ramsten (c) vs. Theodoros Megaritis for the European Heavyweight Championship	
1.	Nikolarakos	Theodoros Megaritis vs. Di Bestia & Yousouf Osman; September 16, 1974	Athens, Greece	Apostolos Nikolaidis Stadium	20,000	Theodoros Megaritis vs. Di Bestia and Yousouf Osman in a handicap match	
2.	Karpozilos	International Catch Festival; September 20, 1970	Athens, Greece	Apostolos Nikolaidis Stadium	15,000	Theodoros Megaritis vs. Atilio	
2.	Nikolarakos	World Catch Festival; September 10, 1973	Athens, Greece	Apostolos Nikolaidis Stadium	15,000	Kostas Papalazarou vs. Di Bestia	
3.	Corporación Internacional de Catch	Modesto Aledo & Pedro Cabrera vs. Chato Pastor & Angel Parra; August 19, 1970	Castellon de la Plana, Spain	Plaza de Toros de Castellon	13,000 (Note: The exact attendance figure is unknown, however, the event is described as being "full". The venue had a seating capacity of 13,000 or more.)	Modesto Aledo & Pedro Cabrera vs. Chato Pastor & Angel Parra	
4.	—	World Catch Festival; August 18, 1971	Athens, Greece	Apostolos Nikolaidis Stadium	10,000	Kostas Nathaniel vs. Kost	
4.	Nikolarakos	World Catch Festival; August 26, 1973	Athens, Greece	Apostolos Nikolaidis Stadium	10,000	Kostas Papalazarou vs. Di Bestia in a Steel Cage match	
4.	—	World Catch Festival; September 9, 1973	Athens, Greece	Nikaia Municipal Stadium	10,000	Kostas Nathanail vs. The Monster	
4.	Nikolarakos	World Catch Festival; September 23, 1973	Athens, Greece	Apostolos Nikolaidis Stadium	10,000	Kostas Papalazarou vs. Di Bestia in a Steel Cage match	
4.	Nikolarakos	World Catch Festival; July 14, 1974	Athens, Greece	Apostolos Nikolaidis Stadium	10,000	Spiros Arion vs. Mark Lewin	
4.	—	World Catch Festival; July 1, 1979	Athens, Greece	Apostolos Nikolaidis Stadium	10,000	Spiros Arion and Kostas Safakas vs. Stan Polanski and Monty Swan	
5.	VABÖ	Georg Blemenschütz & Caswell Martin vs. Iwan Strogoff & Mal Kirk; July 6, 1976	Vienna, Austria	Heumarkt	8,000	Georg Blemenschütz and Caswell Martin vs. Iwan Strogoff and Mal Kirk	
6.	EI	The Pizarro Brothers vs. The Clansmen; August 23, 1973	Murcia, Spain	Plaza de Toros de Murcia	7,500+ (Note: The exact attendance figure is unknown, however, the event is described as "half-full". The venue had a seating capacity of 15,000 or more.)	The Pizarro Brothers (Julian Pizarro & Nino Pizarro) vs. The Clansmen	
6.	VABÖ	Georg Blemenschütz & Caswell Martin vs Iwan Strogoff & Hektor van Mullen; July 12, 1977	Vienna, Austria	Heumarkt	7,500	Georg Blemenschütz and Caswell Martin vs. Iwan Strogoff and Hektor van Mullen	
7.	Nikolarakos	World Catch Festival; June 27, 1976	Athens, Greece	Apostolos Nikolaidis Stadium	7,000	Kostas Papalazarou and Panogiotis Hristofilopoulos vs. Joe Bull and Smith Maxwell	
8.	IBV	Mal Kirk vs. Dave Morgan; August 2, 1977	Krefeld, Germany	Rheinlandhalle	6,500	Mal Kirk vs. Dave Morgan	
9.	Nikolarakos	World Catch Festival; September 27, 1976	Athens, Greece	Apostolos Nikolaidis Stadium	6,000	Di Bestia vs. Kostas Papalazarou in a Steel Cage match	
10.	EI	Nino Pizarro & Antonio Montoro vs. Tito Kopa & Anton Tejero; July 10, 1975	Murcia, Spain	Plaza de Toros de Murcia	Unknown (Note: The exact attendance figure is unknown, however, the event is described as having "quite a crowd" of fans. The venue had a seating capacity of 15,000 or more.)	Nino Pizarro & Antonio Montoro vs. Tito Kopa & Anton Tejero	
10.	EI	The Pizarro Brothers vs. Chato Pastor & Angel Parra; July 8, 1970	Murcia, Spain	Plaza de Toros de Murcia	Unknown (Note: The exact attendance figure is unknown, however, the event is described as having a "great attendance". The venue had a seating capacity of 15,000 or more.)	The Pizarro Brothers (Julian Pizarro & Nino Pizarro) vs. Chato Pastor & Angel Parra	
10.	EI	Modesto Aledo & Paco Ramirez vs. Pancho Badia & Matias Mor; July 17, 1970	Murcia, Spain	Plaza de Toros de Murcia	Unknown	Modesto Aledo & Paco Ramirez vs. Pancho Badia & Matias Mor	

Top 10 most-attended shows in the 1980s
No.	Promotion	Event	Location	Venue	Attendance	Main Event(s)	Ref.
1.	NJPW	NJPW Martial Arts Festival; December 31, 1989	Moscow, Soviet Union	Luzhniki Stadium	15,000	Antonio Inoki and Shota Chochishvili vs. Brad Rheingans and Masa Saito	
2.	Misc.	Antonio Inoki vs. Bad News Allen; January 24, 1988	Rome, Italy	Palasport	13,854	Antonio Inoki vs. Bad News Allen	
3.	Misc.	Antonio Inoki vs. Bad News Allen; January 23, 1988	Milan, Italy		12,125	Antonio Inoki vs. Bad News Allen	
4.	WWF	Harley Race vs. Junkyard Dog; October 23, 1987	Paris, France	Bercy de Paris	12,000	Harley Race vs. Junkyard Dog with special guest referee André the Giant	
5.	PEK	World Catch Festival; September 1, 1980	Athens, Greece	Stavros Mavrothalassitis Stadium	11,500	Kostas Safakas (c) vs. Ivan Borienkoff in a Steel Cage match for the World Heavyweight Championship	
6.	CWA / IBV	IBV European Championship 1984: Catch Cup; December 22, 1984	Bremen, Germany	Stadthalle Bremen	10,600	Otto Wanz (c) vs. Chris Bundy for the CWA World Heavyweight Championship	
7.	PEK	World Catch Festival; June 23, 1980	Athens, Greece	Stavros Mavrothalassitis Stadium	10,000	Kostas Safakas (c) vs. John Kowalski for the World Heavyweight Championship	
7.	CWA / IBV	IBV European Championship 1983: Catch Cup; December 20, 1983	Bremen, Germany	Stadthalle Bremen	10,000	Otto Wanz (c) vs. Big John Studd for the CWA World Heavyweight Championship	
7.	CWA	CWA Catch-Cup; December 19, 1987	Bremen, Germany	Stadthalle Bremen	10,000	Otto Wanz (c) vs. André the Giant for the CWA World Heavyweight Championship	
7.	CWA	CWA Catch-Cup; December 17, 1988	Bremen, Germany	Stadthalle Bremen	10,000	Otto Wanz (c) vs. The Great Kokina for the CWA World Heavyweight Championship	
8.	CWA / IBV	IBV Europa Pokal 1981: AWA vs. CWA World Championship - "Fight of the Century"; December 19, 1981	Bremen, Germany	Stadthalle Bremen	9,500	Otto Wanz (c-CWA) vs. Nick Bockwinkel (c-AWA) in a Champion vs. Champion match for the AWA World Heavyweight Championship and CWA World Heavyweight Championship	
9.	WWF	Harley Race vs. Junkyard Dog; October 24, 1987	Milan, Italy		8,500	Harley Race vs. Junkyard Dog	
10.	CWA / IBV	IBV World Catch Cup; December 20, 1980	Bremen, Germany	Stadthalle Bremen	8,000	Otto Wanz (c) vs. Steve Pearsay for the CWA World Heavyweight Championship	

Top 10 most-attended shows in the 1990s
No.	Promotion	Event	Location	Venue	Attendance	Main Event(s)	Ref.
1.	WWF	WWF on Tele5; October 5, 1991	Barcelona, Spain	Palau Sant Jordi	19,000	Tito Santana vs. The Undertaker	
2.	WWF	WWF European Winter Tour (Day 2); February 6, 1994	Dortmund, Germany	Westfalenhalle	13,000	Yokozuna (c) vs. Bret Hart for the WWF World Heavyweight Championship	
2.	WWF	WWF In High Gear Tour (Day 1); April 17, 1995	Dortmund, Germany	Westfalenhalle	13,000	The Undertaker vs. Bam Bam Bigelow	
3.	WWF	WWF European Rampage (Day 8); April 14, 1992	Munich, Germany	Olympiahalle	12,345	Randy Savage (c) vs. Shawn Michaels for the WWF World Heavyweight Championship	
4.	WWF	WWF European Summer Tour (Day 4); August 1, 1993	Munich, Germany	Olympiahalle	12,000	Yokozuna (c) vs. Hulk Hogan for the WWF World Heavyweight Championship	
4.	WWF	WWF European Spring Tour (Day 10); March 27, 1994	Dortmund, Germany	Westfalenhalle	12,000	Yokozuna vs. Lex Luger	
5.	CWA	CWA Euro Catch Festival; December 21, 1991	Bremen, Germany	Stadthalle Bremen	10,000	Rambo (c) vs. Ken Patera for the CWA World Heavyweight Championship	
5.	WWF	WWF European Rampage Again Tour (Day 8); October 1, 1992	Munich, Germany	Olympiahalle	10,000	Ric Flair (c) vs. Randy Savage for the WWF World Heavyweight Championship	
5.	WWF	WWF European Winter Tour (Day 4); December 7, 1994	Berlin, Germany	Deutschlandhalle	10,000	The British Bulldog vs. King Kong Bundy	
5.	WWF	WWF World Tour; April 11, 1992	Milan, Italy	Fila Forum	10,000	Randy Savage (c) vs. The Mountie for the WWF World Heavyweight Championship	
6.	WWF	WWF In High Gear Tour (Day 5); April 21, 1995	Munich, Germany	Olympiahalle	9,800	Diesel and Razor Ramon vs. Psycho Sid and Jeff Jarrett	
7.	CWA	CWA Euro Catch Festival; December 22, 1990	Bremen, Germany	Stadthalle Bremen	9,000	Rambo vs. Bull Power for the vacant CWA World Heavyweight Championship	
7.	WWF	WWF World Tour; April 15, 1992	Frankfurt, Germany	Festhalle	9,000	Randy Savage (c) vs. The Mountie for the WWF World Heavyweight Championship	
7.	WWF	WWF European Spring Tour (Day 17); April 23, 1993	Frankfurt, Germany	Festhalle	9,000	Bret Hart vs. Bam Bam Bigelow	
8.	CWA	CWA Euro Catch Festival; December 19, 1992	Bremen, Germany	Stadthalle Bremen	8,000	Rambo (c) vs. Road Warrior Hawk for the CWA World Heavyweight Championship	
8.	WWF	DX In Germany Tour (Day 2); April 6, 1998	Berlin, Germany	Deutschlandhalle	8,000	Steve Austin (c) vs. Triple H for the WWF Championship	
9.	WCW	WCW Hulkamania Tour (Day 5); September 7, 1994	Bad Segeberg, Germany	Kalkberg Stadium	7,700	Hulk Hogan (c) vs. Ric Flair for the WCW World Heavyweight Championship	
10.	WWF	WWF European Spring Tour (Day 19); April 25, 1993	Milan, Italy	Forum di Assago	7,500	Bret Hart vs. Bam Bam Bigelow	

Top 10 most-attended shows in the 2000s
No.	Promotion	Event	Location	Venue	Attendance	Main Event(s)	Ref.
1.	WWE	WWE SmackDown; June 18, 2005	Dublin, Ireland	Convention Centre Dublin	22,000	John Cena (c) vs. John Bradshaw Layfield vs. Kurt Angle in a three-way elimination match for the WWE Championship with special guest referee Steve Austin	
2.	NWE	NWE USA Pressing Catch Tour (Day 1); April 19, 2008	Madrid, Spain	El Palacio Vista Alegre	15,000	Booker T vs. Kishi	
2.	WWE	WWE SmackDown & ECW; September 26, 2009	Paris, France	Palais Omnisports de Paris-Bercy	15,000	The Undertaker, Matt Hardy and Batista vs. Chris Jericho, CM Punk and Big Show	
2.	WWE	WWE SmackDown & ECW; September 27, 2009	Paris, France	Palais Omnisports de Paris-Bercy	15,000	The Undertaker (c) vs. CM Punk for the WWE World Heavyweight Championship	
3.	NWE	NWE Summer Tour 2008 (Day 3); June 25, 2008	Badalona, Spain	Pavelló Olímpic	14,000	Orlando Jordan (c) vs. The Warrior for the NWE World Heavyweight Championship	
4.	WWE	WWE SmackDown; April 23, 2006	Cologne, Germany	Kölnarena	12,500	Rey Mysterio (c) vs. Kurt Angle vs. Mark Henry in a three-way elimination match for the WWE World Heavyweight Championship	
5.	WWE	WWE SmackDown; September 14, 2007	Paris, France	Bercy de Paris	12,000	Rey Mysterio and Batista vs. The Great Khali and Finlay	
6.	WWE	WWE SmackDown & ECW; November 15, 2008	Berlin, Germany	O2 World Berlin	11,500	Triple H (c) vs. Big Show for the WWE Championship	
7.	WCW	WCW Millennium Tour; February 12, 2000	Oberhausen, Germany	Oberhausen Arena	11,000	Sid Vicious (c) vs. Jeff Jarrett for the WCW World Heavyweight Championship	
7.	EWF	EWF Round Zero: La Sfida (Day 2); June 4, 2005	Rome, Italy	Palalottomatica	11,000	8-man championship tournament for the inaugural EWF Heavyweight Championship	
8.	WWE	WWE SmackDown; December 6, 2006	Madrid, Spain	Palacio de Deportes de la Comunidad de Madrid	10,000	Batista (c) vs. Big Show vs. Finlay in a three-way match for the WWE World Heavyweight Championship	
8.	NWE	NWE Summer Tour 2008 (Day 9); July 11, 2008	Madrid, Spain	Palacio de Deportes José María Martín Carpena	10,000	Black Pearl, Kishi and Rob Van Dam vs. John Heidenreich, Chris Mordesky and Orlando Jordan	
8.	WWE	WWE SmackDown; December 4, 2006	Lisbon, Portugal	Pavilhão Atlântico	10,000	Batista (c) vs. Mr. Kennedy vs. Finlay in a three-way match for the WWE World Heavyweight Championship	
8.	WWE	WWE SmackDown; December 5, 2006	Lisbon, Portugal	Pavilhão Atlântico	10,000	Batista (c) vs. Finlay for the WWE World Heavyweight Championship	
8.	WWE	WWE SmackDown & ECW; November 9, 2006	Turin, Italy	Palaisozaki	10,000	Batista (c) vs. Finlay vs. King Booker in a three-way elimination match for the WWE World Heavyweight Championship	
8.	WWE	WWE RAW; November 4, 2009	Dublin, Ireland	3Arena	10,000	John Cena (c) vs. Jack Swagger for the WWE Championship	
8.	WWF	WWF RAW; May 1, 2002	Cologne, Germany		10,000	Steve Austin vs. The Undertaker	
8.	WWE	WWE SmackDown & ECW; November 16, 2008	Dortmund, Germany	Westfalenhalle	10,000	Triple H (c) vs. Big Show for the WWE Championship	
8.	WWE	WWE SmackDown & ECW; April 16, 2009	Cologne, Germany	Lanxess Arena	10,000	The Undertaker and Triple H vs. The Legacy (Randy Orton, Cody Rhodes and Ted DiBiase Jr.) in a 3 on 2 Handicap match	
8.	WWE	WWE SmackDown & ECW; April 19, 2009	Vienna, Austria	Wiener Stadthalle	10,000	The Undertaker and Triple H vs. The Legacy (Randy Orton, Cody Rhodes and Ted DiBiase Jr.) in a 3 on 2 Handicap match	
9.	WCW	WCW Millennium Final; November 16, 2000	Oberhausen, Germany	Oberhausen Arena	9,800	Sting (c) vs. Kevin Nash for the European Cup with special referee Axel Schulz	
10.	WWE	WWE RAW; October 13, 2007	Cologne, Germany	Lanxess Arena	9,500	Randy Orton (c) vs. Jeff Hardy for the WWE Championship	

Top 10 most-attended shows in the 2010s
No.	Promotion	Event	Location	Venue	Attendance	Main Event(s)	Ref.
1.	WWE	WWE Raw; September 24, 2010	Paris, France	Bercy de Paris	15,800	Randy Orton (c) vs. Sheamus for the WWE Championship	
1.	WWE	WWE Raw; September 25, 2010	Paris, France	Bercy de Paris	15,800	Randy Orton (c) vs. Edge vs. Sheamus in a three-way elimination match for the WWE Championship	
2.	WWE	WWE Live in Madrid; November 7, 2015	Madrid, Spain	Barclaycard Center	15,000	Roman Reigns vs. Bray Wyatt in a Street Fight match	
3.	WWE	WWE Live in Badalona; November 6, 2015	Badalona, Spain	Pavelló Olímpic	12,300	Roman Reigns vs. Bray Wyatt in a Street Fight match	
4.	WWE	WWE SmackDown; June 12, 2011	Madrid, Spain	El Palacio Vista Alegre	11,000	Randy Orton (c) vs. Christian vs. Sheamus in a three-way match for the WWE World Heavyweight Championship	
4.	WWE	WWE Live in Madrid; November 13, 2014	Madrid, Spain	El Palacio Vista Alegre	11,000	John Cena vs. Seth Rollins in a Street Fight match	
4.	WWE	WWE Live in Paris; April 22, 2016	Paris, France	AccorHotels Arena	11,000	Sami Zayn and Dean Ambrose vs. Kevin Owens and Triple H	
4.	WWE	WWE Live in Barcelona; November 11, 2016	Barcelona, Spain	Palau Sant Jordi	11,000	AJ Styles (c) vs. Dean Ambrose for the WWE World Championship with special timekeeper James Ellsworth	
4.	WWE	WWE Live in Madrid; November 12, 2016	Madrid, Spain	WiZink Center	11,000	AJ Styles (c) vs. Dean Ambrose for the WWE World Championship with special timekeeper James Ellsworth	
5.	WWE	WWE Live in Dublin; May 5, 2017	Dublin, Ireland	3Arena	10,500	Finn Bálor and Seth Rollins vs. Bray Wyatt and Samoa Joe	
6.	WWE	WWE Live in Milan; April 13, 2016	Milan, Italy	Mediolanum Forum	10,386	Roman Reigns (c) vs. Bray Wyatt for the WWE World Heavyweight Championship	
7.	WWE	WWE Live in Paris; November 12, 2014	Paris, France	Bercy Arena	10,000	John Cena vs. Seth Rollins in a Street Fight match	
7.	WWE	WWE RAW; November 13, 2010	Milan, Italy	Forum Assago	10,000	John Cena vs. The Miz	
7.	WWE	WWE Live in Milan; November 14, 2014	Milan, Italy	Mediolanum Forum	10,000	John Cena vs. Seth Rollins in a Street Fight match	
7.	WWE	WWE SmackDown; April 27, 2013	Mannheim, Germany	SAP Arena	10,000	Randy Orton vs. Big Show	
7.	WWE	WWE Live in Frankfurt; November 15, 2014	Frankfurt, Germany	Festhalle	10,000	Chris Jericho vs. Bray Wyatt in a Street Fight match	
8.	WWE	WWE Live in Hamburg; April 15, 2015	Hamburg, Germany	O2 World Hamburg	9,500	Seth Rollins (c) vs. Randy Orton for the WWE World Heavyweight Championship	
9.	WWE	WWE Live in Dublin; April 21, 2016	Dublin, Ireland	3Arena	9,400	Roman Reigns (c) vs. Sheamus for the WWE World Heavyweight Championship	
10.	WWE	WWE Live in Dublin; April 9, 2015	Dublin, Ireland	3Arena	9,200	Roman Reigns vs. Big Show in a Street Fight match	

Top 10 most-attended shows in the 2020s
No.	Promotion	Event	Location	Venue	Attendance	Main Event(s)	Ref.
1	AmineMaTue	The Final Slam	Plenitude Arena	18.000	Amine vs. Squeezie for the Final Slam Championship		

== See also ==
- List of professional wrestling attendance records
- List of professional wrestling attendance records in Japan
- List of professional wrestling attendance records in Puerto Rico
- List of professional wrestling attendance records in the United Kingdom
- List of WWE attendance records
- List of professional wrestling attendance records in Oceania
