= List of professional wrestling attendance records in Puerto Rico =

List of the largest attendances in the history of the American professional wrestling

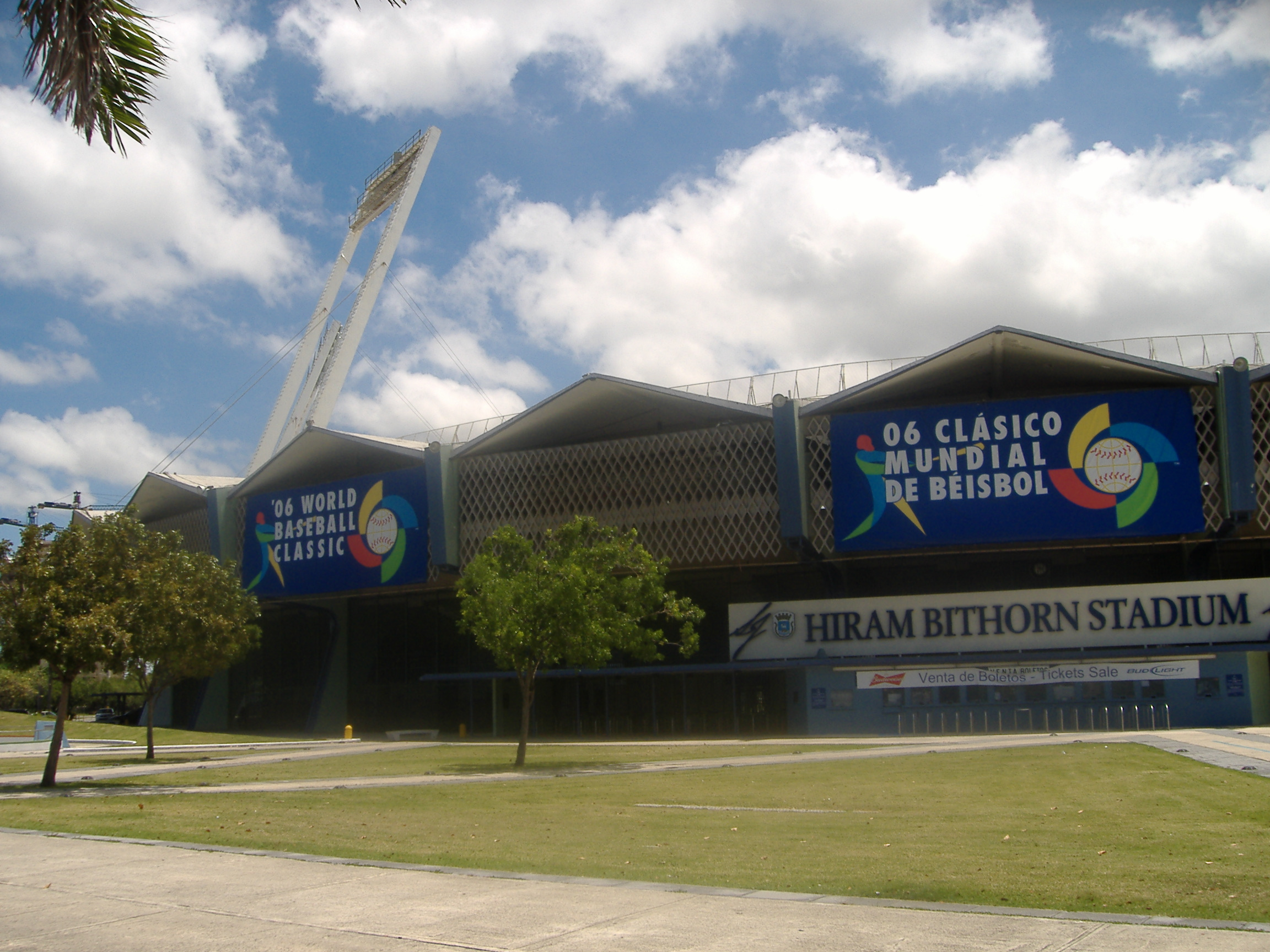
The 1983 edition of WWC Aniversario, held at the Hiram Bithorn Stadium on September 17, 1983, drew approximately 32,000 spectators, making it the country's highest attended pro wrestling event.

The following is a list of professional wrestling attendance records in Puerto Rico. The list is dominated by Puerto Rico's oldest promotion, the World Wrestling Council, which has controlled the industry in the country since its founding in 1973. It was part of the National Wrestling Alliance from 1979 to 1986 and is the last remaining North American member of the original NWA territory system.

According to this list, 6 events are from WWC's annual Aniversario supercard, which in the late-1980s had been held exclusively at the Juan Ramón Loubriel Stadium which typically has a seating capacity of at least 22,000 people or more. Only ten of the attendances listed are non-WWC events, with eight being from the U.S.-based World Wrestling Entertainment including a co-promotional effort with IWA Puerto Rico in 1999. WWE's presence on the island has been gradually increasing since holding its New Year's Revolution pay-per-view (PPV) event in 2005. All but nine of the events have been held in the capital city of San Juan, while seven have been held in Bayamón and two in Ponce, Puerto Rico.

== Events and attendances ==
Promotion	Event	Location	Venue	Attendance	Main Event(s)	Ref.
CSP	WWC Aniversario; September 17, 1983	San Juan, Puerto Rico	Hiram Bithorn Stadium	32,000	Abdullah the Butcher vs. André the Giant	
CSP	Carlos Colón vs. Ric Flair; December 18, 1983	Bayamón, Puerto Rico	Juan Ramón Loubriel Stadium	30,000	Carlos Colón (c) vs. Ric Flair in a steel cage match for the WWC Universal Heavyweight Championship	
CSP	WWC Aniversario; September 15, 1984	San Juan, Puerto Rico	Hiram Bithorn Stadium	29,000	Stan Hansen and Bruiser Brody (c) vs. Abdullah the Butcher and Carlos Colón for the PWF World Tag Team Championship	
CSP	Bruno Sammartino vs. Gorilla Monsoon; July 22, 1978	Bayamón, Puerto Rico	Juan Ramón Loubriel Stadium	25,000	Bruno Sammartino (c) vs. Gorilla Monsoon for the WWC North American Heavyweight Championship	
CSP	Carlos Colón vs. Ric Flair; October 16, 1982	San Juan, Puerto Rico	Hiram Bithorn Stadium	24,000	Carlos Colón (c) vs. Ric Flair for the WWC World Heavyweight Championship	
CSP	Carlos Colón vs. Ric Flair; January 6, 1983	San Juan, Puerto Rico	Hiram Bithorn Stadium	23,000	Carlos Colón (WWC) vs. Ric Flair (NWA) in a Champion vs. Champion match for the WWC World Heavyweight Championship and NWA World Heavyweight Championship	
WWC	WWC Aniversario; September 15, 1987	Bayamón, Puerto Rico	Juan Ramón Loubriel Stadium	23,000	Chicky Starr vs. Invader #1 in a Hair vs. Retirement match	
CSP	Los Dinámicos vs. Los Vaqueros Locos; June 9, 1979	Bayamón, Puerto Rico	Juan Ramón Loubriel Stadium	20,000+	Los Dinámicos (Carlos Colón and José Rivera) vs. Los Vaqueros Locos (Dutch Mantell and Frankie Laine)	
CSP	Carlos Colón vs. Harley Race; April 14, 1981	San Juan, Puerto Rico	Hiram Bithorn Stadium	20,000	Carlos Colón vs. Harley Race	
CSP	Carlos Colón & El Santo vs. Rebelde Rojo & Barrabás; February 1, 1975	Bayamón, Puerto Rico	Juan Ramón Loubriel Stadium	18,000	Carlos Colón and El Santo vs. Rebelde Rojo and Barrabás	
CSP	Carlos Colón vs. Pampero Firpo; August 5, 1979	San Juan, Puerto Rico	Hiram Bithorn Stadium	18,000	Carlos Colón vs. Pampero Firpo	
WWE	WWE SmackDown & ECW; September 4, 2009	San Juan, Puerto Rico	José Miguel Agrelot Coliseum	18,000	Triple H and The Undertaker vs. Cody Rhodes, Ted DiBiase Jr. and CM Punk in a handicap match	
WWE	WWE Backlash; May 6, 2023	San Juan, Puerto Rico	Coliseo de Puerto Rico José Miguel Agrelot	17,944	Cody Rhodes vs. Brock Lesnar	
WWE	WWE Raw; March 8, 2007	San Juan, Puerto Rico	José Miguel Agrelot Coliseum	17,477	John Cena (c) vs. Umaga for the WWE Championship with special guest referee Ricky Steamboat	
WWE	WWE Raw; October 18, 2008	San Juan, Puerto Rico	José Miguel Agrelot Coliseum	17,000	Chris Jericho (c) vs. Shawn Michaels in a No Disqualification match for the WWE World Heavyweight Championship	
WWE	WWE SmackDown; June 29, 2006	San Juan, Puerto Rico	José Miguel Agrelot Coliseum	16,940	The Undertaker vs. The Great Khali and Mark Henry in a handicap match	
WWE	WWE Smackdown; May 5, 2023	San Juan, Puerto Rico	Coliseo de Puerto Rico José Miguel Agrelot	16,896	Rey Mysterio and Zelina Vega vs. Dominik Mysterio and Rhea Ripley in a mixed tag team match	
WWE	WWE New Year's Revolution; January 9, 2005	San Juan, Puerto Rico	José Miguel Agrelot Coliseum	15,764	Triple H vs. Batista vs. Randy Orton vs. Chris Jericho vs. Chris Benoit vs. Edge in an Elimination Chamber match for the vacant World Heavyweight Championship with special guest referee Shawn Michaels	
CSP	Los Dinámicos vs. Los Vaqueros Locos; June 16, 1979	Bayamón, Puerto Rico	Juan Ramón Loubriel Stadium	15,000+	Los Dinámicos (Carlos Colón and José Rivera) vs. Los Vaqueros Locos (Dutch Mantell and Frankie Laine)	
CSP	Los Dinámicos vs. Los Vaqueros Locos; June 23, 1979	Bayamón, Puerto Rico	Juan Ramón Loubriel Stadium	15,000+	Los Dinámicos (Carlos Colón and José Rivera) vs. Los Vaqueros Locos (Dutch Mantell and Frankie Laine)	
CSP	Battle of the Gladiators; October 19, 1985	Bayamon, Puerto Rico	Juan Ramon Loubriel Stadium	15,000	Carlos Colon vs. Abdullah the Butcher for the vacant WWC Universal Championship	
IWA	Miguel Pérez Jr. & Road Dogg vs. The Brood; June 25, 1999	San Juan, Puerto Rico	Hiram Bithorn Stadium	15,000	Miguel Pérez Jr. and Road Dogg vs. The Brood (Gangrel and Christian)	
WWC	Carlos Colón vs. Invader #1; April 19, 1992	Bayamón, Puerto Rico	Juan Ramón Loubriel Stadium	14,000	Carlos Colón vs. Invader #1	
IWA / WWF	IWA/WWF Histeria Boricua; January 6, 1999	Ponce, Puerto Rico	Auditorio Juan Pachín Vicéns	14,000	The Puerto Rican Express (Miguel Pérez Jr. and Huracán Castillo Jr.) vs. New Age Outlaws (Billy Gunn and Road Dogg) with special referee Savio Vega	
WWE	WWE Raw; August 26, 2005	San Juan, Puerto Rico	José Miguel Agrelot Coliseum	13,200	John Cena (c) vs. Kurt Angle vs. Shawn Michaels in a three-way elimination match for the WWE Championship	
CSP	Gorilla Monsoon vs. Bruno Sammartino; March 11, 1978	Bayamón, Puerto Rico	Juan Ramón Loubriel Stadium	13,000	Gorilla Monsoon vs. Bruno Sammartino	
WWE	WWE Live in Puerto Rico; August 29, 2015	San Juan, Puerto Rico	José Miguel Agrelot Coliseum	13,000	Roman Reigns vs. Bray Wyatt in a Street Fight match	
WWE	WWE Live in Puerto Rico; June 8, 2017	San Juan, Puerto Rico	José Miguel Agrelot Coliseum	12,500	Jinder Mahal (c) vs. Randy Orton for the WWE Championship	
CSP	Three Kings Day; January 6, 1979	San Juan, Puerto Rico		12,000	Chief War Cloud (c) vs. Don Kent for the WWC Caribbean Heavyweight Championship	
WWC	WWC Aniversario; August 8, 1993	Bayamón, Puerto Rico	Juan Ramón Loubriel Stadium	12,000	Carlos Colón vs. Terry Funk in a retirement match	
WWC	WWC Aniversario (Day 2); September 8, 2001	Bayamón, Puerto Rico	Juan Ramón Loubriel Stadium	12,000	Abdullah the Butcher vs. Big Hail	
WWC	Thunder & Lightning vs. The Windham Brothers; January 6, 2001	San Juan, Puerto Rico	Hiram Bithorn Stadium	11,850	Thunder & Lightning (Thunder and Lightning) vs. Barry Windham and Kendall Windham	
CSP	Carlos Colón vs. Pampero Firpo; July 14, 1979	San Juan, Puerto Rico		11,000	Carlos Colón vs. Pampero Firpo	
WWC	WWC Aniversario (Day 1); September 7, 2001	Ponce, Puerto Rico	Auditorio Juan Pachín Vicéns	11,000	Carly Colón and Súper Gladiador vs Thunder & Lightning (Thunder and Lightning)	

== Historical ==
Top 10 most-attended shows in the 1970s
No.	Promotion	Event	Location	Venue	Attendance	Main Event(s)
1.	CSP	Bruno Sammartino vs. Gorilla Monsoon; July 22, 1978	Bayamón, Puerto Rico	Juan Ramón Loubriel Stadium	25,000	Bruno Sammartino (c) vs. Gorilla Monsoon for the WWC North American Heavyweight Championship
2.	CSP	Los Dinámicos vs. Los Vaqueros Locos; June 9, 1979	Bayamón, Puerto Rico	Juan Ramón Loubriel Stadium	20,000+	Los Dinámicos (Carlos Colón and José Rivera) vs. Los Vaqueros Locos (Dutch Mantell and Frankie Laine)
3.	CSP	Carlos Colón and El Santo vs. Rebelde Rojo and Barrabás; February 1, 1975	Bayamón, Puerto Rico	Juan Ramón Loubriel Stadium	18,000	Carlos Colón and El Santo vs. Rebelde Rojo and Barrabás
3.	CSP	Carlos Colón vs. Pampero Firpo; August 5, 1979	San Juan, Puerto Rico	Hiram Bithorn Stadium	18,000	Carlos Colón vs. Pampero Firpo
4.	CSP	Los Dinámicos vs. Los Vaqueros Locos; June 16, 1979	Bayamón, Puerto Rico	Juan Ramón Loubriel Stadium	15,000+	Los Dinámicos (Carlos Colón and José Rivera) vs. Los Vaqueros Locos (Dutch Mantell and Frankie Laine)
4.	CSP	Los Dinámicos vs. Los Vaqueros Locos; June 23, 1979	Bayamón, Puerto Rico	Juan Ramón Loubriel Stadium	15,000+	Los Dinámicos (Carlos Colón and José Rivera) vs. Los Vaqueros Locos (Dutch Mantell and Frankie Laine)
5.	CSP	Gorilla Monsoon vs. Bruno Sammartino; March 11, 1978	Bayamón, Puerto Rico	Juan Ramón Loubriel Stadium	13,000	Gorilla Monsoon vs. Bruno Sammartino
6.	CSP	Three Kings Day; January 6, 1979	San Juan, Puerto Rico		12,000	Chief War Cloud (c) vs. Don Kent for the WWC Caribbean Heavyweight Championship
7.	CSP	Carlos Colón vs. Pampero Firpo; July 14, 1979	San Juan, Puerto Rico		11,000	Carlos Colón vs. Pampero Firpo
8.	CSP	Los Vaqueros Locos vs. Carlos Colón & Huracán Castillo; May 5, 1979	San Juan, Puerto Rico	Roberto Clemente Coliseum	10,000+	Los Vaqueros Locos (Dutch Mantell and Frankie Laine) (c) vs. Carlos Colón and Huracán Castillo for the WWC North American Tag Team Championship
9.	CSP	Gorilla Monsoon vs. Bruno Sammartino; May 24, 1978	San Juan, Puerto Rico		10,000	Gorilla Monsoon vs. Bruno Sammartino
10.	CSP	Carlos Colón & Huracán Castillo vs. Los Vaqueros Locos; May 19, 1979	Bayamón, Puerto Rico	Juan Ramón Loubriel Stadium	Unknown (Note: The exact attendance figure is unknown, however, the event is described as having "among the biggest crowds" at the stadium.)	Carlos Colón and Huracán Castillo (c) vs. Los Vaqueros Locos (Dutch Mantell and Frankie Laine) for the WWC North American Tag Team Championship

Top 10 most-attended shows in the 1980s
No.	Promotion	Event	Location	Venue	Attendance	Main Event(s)
1.	CSP	WWC Aniversario; September 17, 1983	San Juan, Puerto Rico	Hiram Bithorn Stadium	32,000	Abdullah the Butcher vs. André the Giant
2.	CSP	Carlos Colón vs. Ric Flair; December 18, 1983	Bayamón, Puerto Rico	Juan Ramón Loubriel Stadium	30,000	Carlos Colón (c) vs. Ric Flair in a steel cage match for the WWC Universal Heavyweight Championship
3.	CSP	WWC Aniversario; September 15, 1984	San Juan, Puerto Rico	Hiram Bithorn Stadium	29,000	Stan Hansen and Bruiser Brody (c) vs. Abdullah the Butcher and Carlos Colón for the PWF World Tag Team Championship
4.	WWC	Carlos Colon vs. The Iron Sheik; January 30, 1988	San Juan, Puerto Rico	Roberto Clemente Coliseum	25,000	Carlos Colon (c) vs. The Iron Sheik for the WWC Universal Heavyweight Championship
5.	CSP	Carlos Colón vs. Ric Flair; October 16, 1982	San Juan, Puerto Rico	Hiram Bithorn Stadium	24,000	Carlos Colón (c) vs. Ric Flair for the WWC World Heavyweight Championship
6.	CSP	Carlos Colón vs. Ric Flair; January 6, 1983	San Juan, Puerto Rico	Hiram Bithorn Stadium	23,000	Carlos Colón (WWC) vs. Ric Flair (NWA) in a Champion vs. Champion match for the WWC World Heavyweight Championship and NWA World Heavyweight Championship
6.	WWC	WWC Aniversario; September 15, 1987	Bayamón, Puerto Rico	Juan Ramón Loubriel Stadium	23,000	Chicky Starr vs. Invader #1 in a Hair vs. Retirement match
7.	CSP	WWC Aniversario; September 21, 1985	San Juan, Puerto Rico	Hiram Bithorn Stadium	22,000	Jimmy Valiant vs. Kamala
8.	CSP	Carlos Colón vs. Harley Race; April 14, 1981	San Juan, Puerto Rico	Hiram Bithorn Stadium	20,000	Carlos Colón vs. Harley Race
9.	CSP	WWC Aniversario (Night 3); September 21, 1986	San Juan, Puerto Rico	Hiram Bithorn Stadium	17,500	Carlos Colon vs. Terry Funk for the vacant WWC Universal Heavyweight Championship
10.	WWC	WWC Aniversario; September 10, 1988	Bayamón, Puerto Rico	Rubén Rodríguez Coliseum	17,000	Hurricane Castillo Jr. and Miguel Perez Jr. vs. Bobby Jaggers and Dan Kroffat in a Hair vs. Hair match
10.	WWC	WWC Aniversario; October 7, 1989	Bayamón, Puerto Rico	Juan Ramón Loubriel Stadium	17,000	Steve Strong (c) vs. Carlos Colon in a barbed wire cage match to win the WWC Universal Heavyweight Championship

Top 10 most-attended shows in the 1990s
No.	Promotion	Event	Location	Venue	Attendance	Main Event(s)
1.	IWA	Miguel Pérez Jr. and Road Dogg vs. The Brood; June 25, 1999	San Juan, Puerto Rico	Hiram Bithorn Stadium	15,000	Miguel Pérez Jr. and Road Dogg vs. The Brood (Gangrel and Christian)
2.	WWC	Carlos Colón vs. Invader #1; April 19, 1992	Bayamón, Puerto Rico	Juan Ramón Loubriel Stadium	14,000	Carlos Colón vs. Invader #1
2.	IWA / WWF	IWA/WWF Histeria Boricua (Day 2); January 6, 1999	Ponce, Puerto Rico	Auditorio Juan Pachín Vicéns	14,000	The Puerto Rican Express (Miguel Pérez Jr. and Huracán Castillo Jr.) vs. New Age Outlaws (Billy Gunn and Road Dogg) with special referee Savio Vega
3.	WWC	WWC Aniversario; August 1, 1998	San Juan, Puerto Rico	Hiram Bithorn Stadium	13,000	Ricky Santana vs. El Texano in a Hair vs. Hair match
4.	WWC	WWC Aniversario; August 8, 1993	Bayamón, Puerto Rico	Juan Ramón Loubriel Stadium	12,000	Carlos Colón vs. Terry Funk in a retirement match
5.	WWC	WWC Aniversario; August 14, 1999	Caguas, Puerto Rico	Parque Yldefonso Solá Morales	11,678	Abdullah the Butcher vs. Tower of Doom in a Lumberjacks with Whips match
6.	IWA / WWF	IWA/WWF Histeria Boricua (Day 1); January 5, 1999	Caguas, Puerto Rico	Coliseo Héctor Solá Bezares	9,000	The Undertaker vs Kane
7.	WWC	WWC Aniversario; August 15, 1997	Bayamón, Puerto Rico	Juan Ramón Loubriel Stadium	8,000	Ray González (c) vs. Tom Brandi for the WWC Universal Heavyweight Championship
7.	WWC	Carlos Colón & Abdullah the Butcher vs. La Familia del Milenio; December 20, 1998	Bayamón, Puerto Rico	Juan Ramón Loubriel Stadium	8,000	Carlos Colón and Abdullah the Butcher vs. La Familia del Milenio (Ray González and Víctor the Bodyguard)
8.	IWA / WWF	Christmas in Puerto Rico (Day 1); December 15, 1999	San Juan, Puerto Rico	Roberto Clemente Coliseum	7,800	Kane and The Godfather vs. Ministry of Darkness (The Undertaker and Viscera)
9.	WWC	WWC Aniversario; August 6, 1994	Bayamón, Puerto Rico	Juan Ramón Loubriel Stadium	7,500	Eddie Gilbert vs. Huracán Castillo Jr. in a No Ropes Barbed Wire Fire match
10.	WWC	Carlos Colón vs. Bronco I October 8, 1994	Bayamón, Puerto Rico	Juan Ramón Loubriel Stadium	7,000	Carlos Colón (c) vs. Bronco I for the WWC Universal Heavyweight Championship

Top 10 most-attended shows in the 2000s
No.	Promotion	Event	Location	Venue	Attendance	Main Event(s)
1.	WWE	WWE SmackDown & ECW; September 4, 2009	San Juan, Puerto Rico	José Miguel Agrelot Coliseum	18,000	Triple H and The Undertaker vs. Cody Rhodes, Ted DiBiase Jr. and CM Punk in a handicap match
2.	WWE	WWE Raw; March 8, 2007	San Juan, Puerto Rico	José Miguel Agrelot Coliseum	17,477	John Cena (c) vs. Umaga for the WWE Championship with special guest referee Ricky Steamboat
3.	WWE	WWE Raw; October 18, 2008	San Juan, Puerto Rico	José Miguel Agrelot Coliseum	17,000	Chris Jericho (c) vs. Shawn Michaels in a No Disqualification match for the WWE World Heavyweight Championship
4.	WWE	WWE SmackDown; June 29, 2006	San Juan, Puerto Rico	José Miguel Agrelot Coliseum	16,940	The Undertaker vs. The Great Khali and Mark Henry in a handicap match
5.	WWE	WWE New Year's Revolution; January 9, 2005	San Juan, Puerto Rico	José Miguel Agrelot Coliseum	15,764	Triple H vs. Batista vs. Randy Orton vs. Chris Jericho vs. Chris Benoit vs. Edge in an Elimination Chamber match for the vacant World Heavyweight Championship with special guest referee Shawn Michaels
6.	WWE	WWE Raw; August 26, 2005	San Juan, Puerto Rico	José Miguel Agrelot Coliseum	13,200	John Cena (c) vs. Kurt Angle vs. Shawn Michaels in a three-way elimination match for the WWE Championship
7.	WWC	WWC Aniversario (Day 2); September 8, 2001	Bayamón, Puerto Rico	Juan Ramón Loubriel Stadium	12,000	Abdullah the Butcher vs. Big Hail
8.	WWC	Thunder & Lightning vs. The Windham Brothers; January 6, 2001	San Juan, Puerto Rico	Hiram Bithorn Stadium	11,850	Thunder & Lightning (Thunder and Lightning) vs. Barry Windham and Kendall Windham
9.	WWC	WWC Aniversario (Day 1); September 7, 2001	Ponce, Puerto Rico	Auditorio Juan Pachín Vicéns	11,000	Carly Colón and Súper Gladiador vs Thunder & Lightning (Thunder and Lightning)
10.	WWC	WWC Aniversario; July 11, 2009	Bayamón, Puerto Rico	Coliseo Rubén Rodríguez	10,400	Ray González vs. La Pesadilla in a Mask vs. Hair match with special referee Tito Trinidad

Top 10 most-attended shows in the 2010s
No.	Promotion	Event	Location	Venue	Attendance	Main Event(s)
1.	WWE	WWE Live in San Juan; August 29, 2015	San Juan, Puerto Rico	José Miguel Agrelot Coliseum	13,000	Roman Reigns vs. Bray Wyatt in a Street Fight match
2.	WWE	WWE Live in San Juan; June 8, 2017	San Juan, Puerto Rico	José Miguel Agrelot Coliseum	12,500	Jinder Mahal (c) vs. Randy Orton for the WWE Championship
3.	WWC	WWC Euphoria; January 6, 2013	Bayamón, Puerto Rico	Coliseo Rubén Rodríguez	10,000	Ricky Banderas vs. Apolo
4.	WWE	WWE RAW; September 3, 2010	Ponce, Puerto Rico	Auditorio Juan Pachín Vicéns	9,000	John Cena, Mark Henry, John Morrison and Primo vs. The Nexus (Wade Barrett, David Otunga, Justin Gabriel and Heath Slater)
5.	WWE	WWE SmackDown; January 5, 2013	San Juan, Puerto Rico	José Miguel Agrelot Coliseum	7,000	Big Show (c) vs. Randy Orton vs. Sheamus in a 3-Way match for the WWE World Heavyweight Championship
6.	WWC	WWC Euphoria; January 16, 2010	San Juan, Puerto Rico	José Miguel Agrelot Coliseum	6,000	Ray González vs. Carlito Caribbean Cool vs. El Mega Campeon de AAA in a 3-Way match for the Puerto Rico Wrestler of the Decade Cup
7.	WWC	WWC Aniversario; July 11, 2010	Bayamón, Puerto Rico	Coliseo Rubén Rodríguez	5,500	Ricky Banderas vs. Carlito Caribbean Cool
8.	WWC	WWC Aniversario; July 16, 2011	Bayamón, Puerto Rico	Coliseo Rubén Rodríguez	4,500	Los Fugitivos de la Calle (Lynx and El Niche) (c) vs. La Artilleria Pesada (Thunder and Lightning) for the WWC World Tag Team Championship
9.	WWL	WWL Guerra de Reyes; January 6, 2015	San Juan, Puerto Rico	Roberto Clemente Coliseum	4,200	Carlitos vs. Hammett in a Tables, Ladders & Chairs match to determine the number-one contender for the WWL Americas Championship
10.	WWC	WWC Aniversario; June 30, 2012	Bayamón, Puerto Rico	Coliseo Rubén Rodríguez	4,000	
10.	WWL	WWL Navidad Corporativa; December 13, 2014	Bayamón, Puerto Rico	La Cancha Pepín Cestero	4,000	Carlitos vs. Hammett
10.	WWC	WWC Lockout; December 5, 2015	Bayamón, Puerto Rico	Coliseo Rubén Rodríguez	4,000	Mr. 450 (c) vs. Carlitos for the WWC Unified Universal Heavyweight Championship
10.	WWC	WWC Euphoria; January 9, 2016	Bayamón, Puerto Rico	Coliseo Rubén Rodríguez	4,000	Mr. 450 (c) vs. Carlitos in a Tables, Ladders & Chairs match for the WWC Unified Universal Heavyweight Championship
10.	WS	MysterioMania 3: Tributo Al Mesias Ricky Banderas; November 29, 2018	Guaynabo, Puerto Rico	Mario Morales Coliseum	4,000	Penta el 0M (c) vs. Ricky Banderas for the WS World Submission Lucha Championship

== See also ==
- List of professional wrestling attendance records
- List of professional wrestling attendance records in Europe
- List of professional wrestling attendance records in Japan
- List of professional wrestling attendance records in the United Kingdom
- List of WWE attendance records
- List of professional wrestling attendance records in Oceania
