= Magnus Bech-Olsen =

Danish wrestler and circus manager

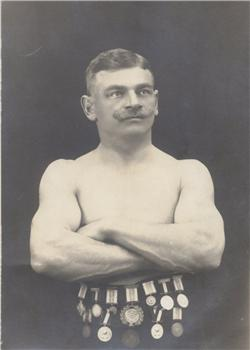
Magnus Bech-Olsen

Magnus Emanuel Bech-Olsen (7 December 1866 - 19 February 1932) was a Danish professional wrestler and circus manager.

== Early life ==
Bech-Olsen was born on 7 December 1866 in the Vesterbro district of Copenhagen. His parents were brick-layer Niels Jakobsen and Ellen Marie Hansen (née Olsen 1824–99).

They later moved to Køge. After completing a mason's apprenticeship in his home town, he travelled to Germany as a journeyman. In the 1880s, he settled in Hamburg as a master mason. On 14 May 1888 in Hamburg, he was married to Oline Vilhelmine Agnes Gerdes (1861–1922).

== Wrestling career ==
In Hamburg, Bech-Olsen was taught wrestling by the wrestling champion Carl Abs in the Roland wrestling club in Sankt Pauli. He soon came to promenance as "Der unüberwindbare Däne". In 1864, by defeateing Carl Abs twice, first in Nainz and then in Berlin, he won the German championship. He then returned to Copenhagen where he bought a bar on Helgolandsgade in Vesterbro, renaming it Café Bech-Olsen.

On 19 July 1896, in a match hosted by the Danish Wrestling Federation at the Sankt Thomas entertainment venue on Frederiksberg Allé, Bech-Olsen defeated John Pohl. The match lasted 20 minutes. Less than two months later, on 27 September 1896, in another match hosted by the Danish Wrestling Federation at Sankt Thomas, he defeated Memisch Effendi. This match lasted around one hour.

On 27 August 1897, Bech-Olsen defeated Heinrich Niemann in a 26-minute match at Ordrup Velodrome. One month later, on 26 September 1897, in another match at Ordrup Velodrome, Bech-Olsen defeated Antonio Pierri, who claimed to be world champion in Greco-Roman wrestling. After a rematch on 3 October, in front of an audience of 10,000 spectators, Pierri handed his championship belt over to Bech-Olsen.

In 1898, Bech-Olsen met Tom Bradley (24 April and 30 May 1898, Charlottenlund Racetrack), Antonio Pierri (26 June 1898 Esbjerg Cycle Track), Leon Masson (16 July 1898, Charlottenlund Racetrack), Charles Green (14 August, Charlottenlund Tacetrack) and Camillus Ewertsen (9 October, Charlottenlund Racetrack).

On 1 and 8 October 1899, Bech-Olsen defeated Paul Pons at Charlottenlund Racetrack.

In 1899–1900, Bech-Olsen toured the United States. On 27 March 1900, in New York City, he defeated Ernest Roeber, in what was billed as the "champion wrestler of Europe" meeting the "Graeco-Roman champion of America" in a world championship match. A reporter wrote: "(The 12,000) saw the best match that has been wrestled in New York in years ...Olsen won by one of the cleverest tricks seen on the mat. It is called a Cumberland fall. He spun around twice, presenting his back to Roeber who, in trying to catch a hold, rushed into the Dane's arms. He was thrown hard with the whole 286 pounds of the Dane on top of him. He was carried to his corner, and a police sergeant refused to permit him to continue".

Back in Denmark, on 12 August 1899, Bech-Olsen defeated Paul Belling in another match at Charlottenlund Racetrack. On 16 September 1900, he drew Ernest Roeber in a 30-minute match at Charlottenlund Racetrack. The rematch, which took place on 23 Septemberm was won by Bech-Olsen.

On 19 August 1903, Bech Olsen was defeated by Nourlah at Charlottenlund Racetrack. The rematch, which took place at Circus-Variete a few days later, was won by Bech-Lund. On 20 September 1903, he defeated George Hackenschmidt at Charlottenlund Racetrack. On 4 October 1903, he was defeated by Jess Pedersen in five minutes. On 2 October 1904, this time at Østerbro Stadium, Bech-Olsen was again defeated by Jess Pedersen. This was his last high-profile wrestling match.

== Circus Bech-Olsen ==
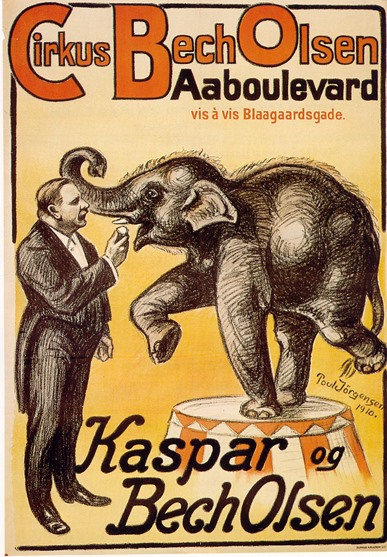
Advert for Circus Bech-Olsen

He also went on tour in the United States. After a couple of defeats, he finally retired from the wrestling scene. On 20 April 1908, he established Circus Bech-Olsen in Frederikshavn. On 3 August 1910, he inaugurated a large new circus building on Aaboulevarden in Copenhagen. Some time later, when he began touring the country with his circus, he converted the building into a cinema under the name Kæmpe Biografen. It was sold and demolished in 1919.

From 1917 Bech-Olsen lived with his family on his property Christinesminde, near Nørresundby.

== Legacy ==
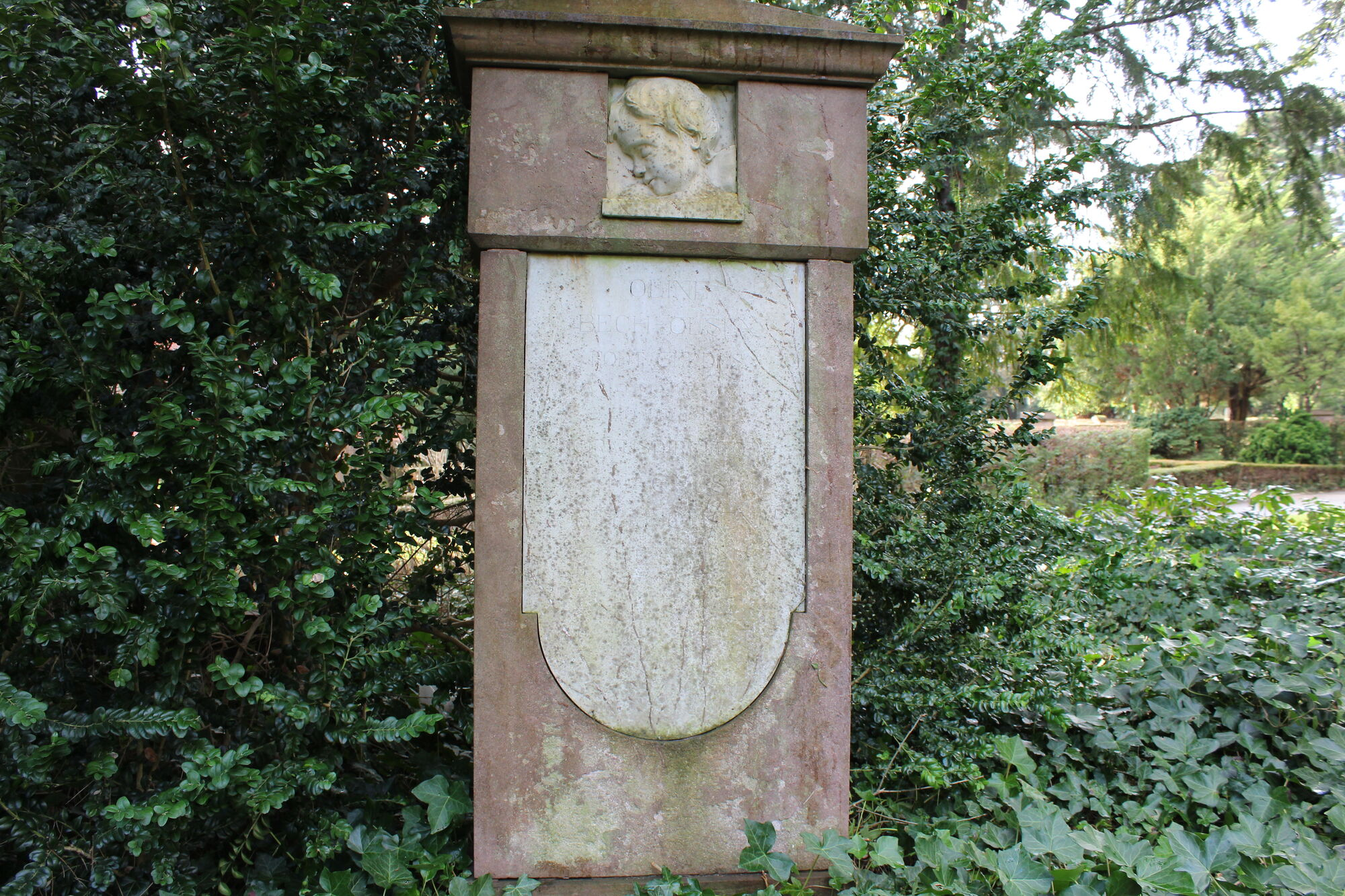
Buch-Olsen's tombstone at Copenhagen's Eestern Cemetery.

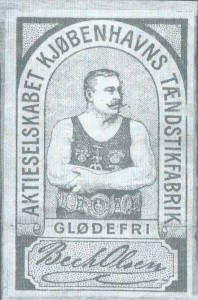
A matchbox with Bech-Olsen's portrait

Bech-Olsen died on 19 February 1932 and is buried at Copenhagen's Western Cemetery. The circus was continued by his son Eitel Vilhelm Bech-Olsen (1890–1952), aka "Manne", for another three seasons. The last show took place in Rødding on 23 August 1934.

The songwriter Julius Strandberg wrote a song about him. Kjøbenhavns Tændstiksfabrik launched a series of matchboxes featuring his portrait in the years 1897–1902.

== See also ==
- List of professional wrestling attendance records in Europe
