= Andreas Lambrakis =

Personal information
- Born: Greece

Professional wrestling career
- Billed weight: 224 lb (102 kg)
- Retired: 1965

Andreas Lambrakis (Greek: Ανδρέας Λαμπράκης) was a professional wrestler from Greece. Billed as a former "Greek Heavyweight Champion" he was active in Australia during the 1950s and 1960s, and also competed in the World Wide Wrestling Federation. He was a mentor to the new up and coming Greek wrestler who would famously be called Spiros Arion who at the start of his career billed himself as the son of Lambrakis. In 1964, he scored several significant wins in Toronto.

== Championships and accomplishments ==
- Other titles
  - Greek Heavyweight Championship (1 time)
  - European Heavyweight Championship (1 time)
