= Charlottenlund Racetrack =

Harness racing track in Charlottenlund, Denmark

Coordinates: 55.754337°N 12.587886°E

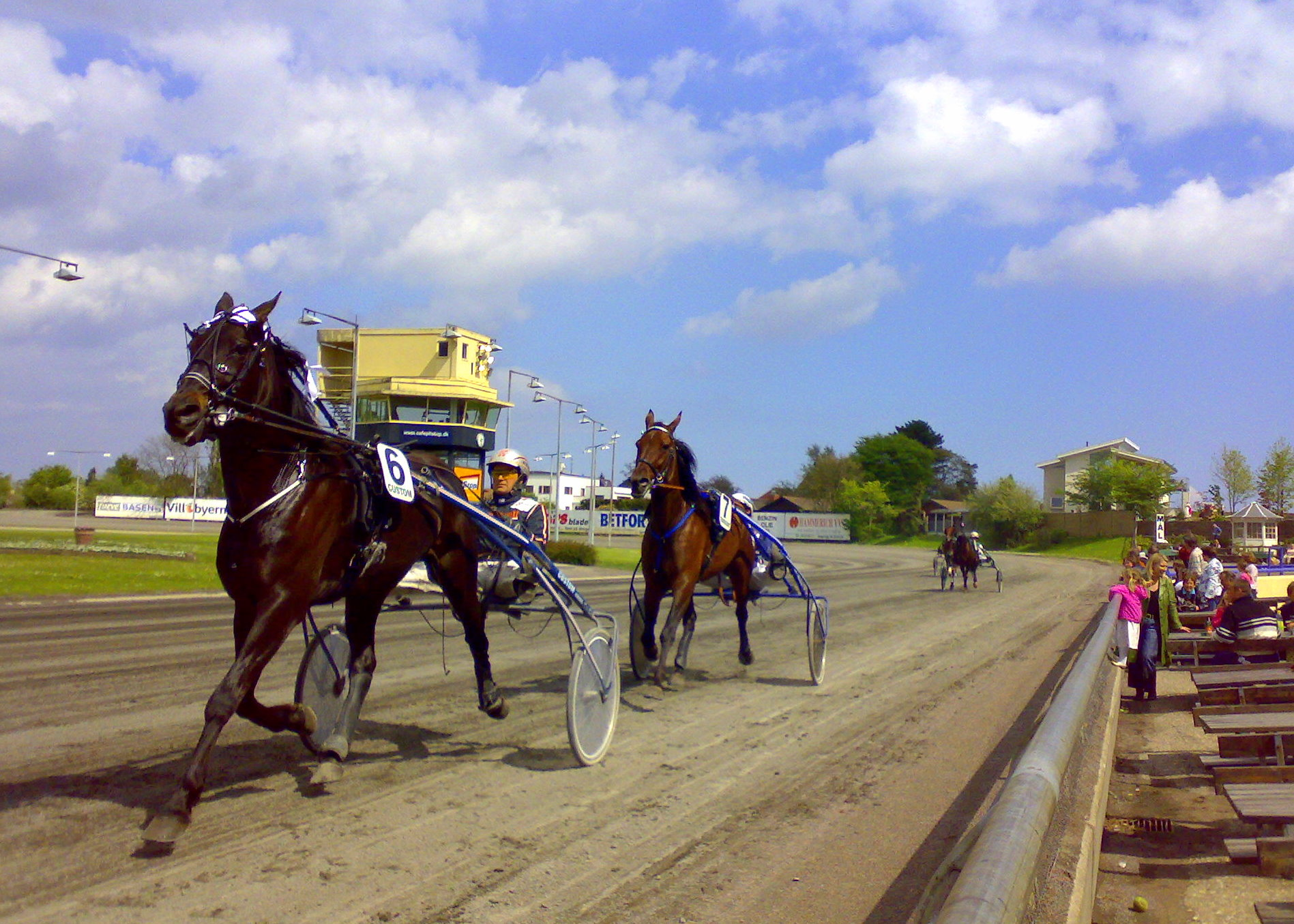
Charlottenlund Travbane.jpg

Charlottenlund Racetrack (Danish: Charlottenlund Travbane) is a harness racing track in the town of Charlottenlund in the Capital Region of Denmark.

The racetrack, nicknamed Lunden, was established in 1891 by the Danish Trotting Club (Det Danske Travselskab). The annual major events at Charlottenlund Racetrack are the Danish Trotting Derby and international Copenhagen Cup.

== Cultural references ==
Charlottenlund Racecourse has been used as a location in the following films:.

- Odds 777 (1932)
- Moster fra Mols (1943)
- De røde heste - 1950 (1950)
- Der var engang en gade (1957)
- De røde heste - 1968 (1968)
- Olsen-bandens store kup (1972)
- Nitten røde roser (1974)
- Kampen om den røde ko (1987)
- Tarok (2013)
