= List of WWE attendance records =

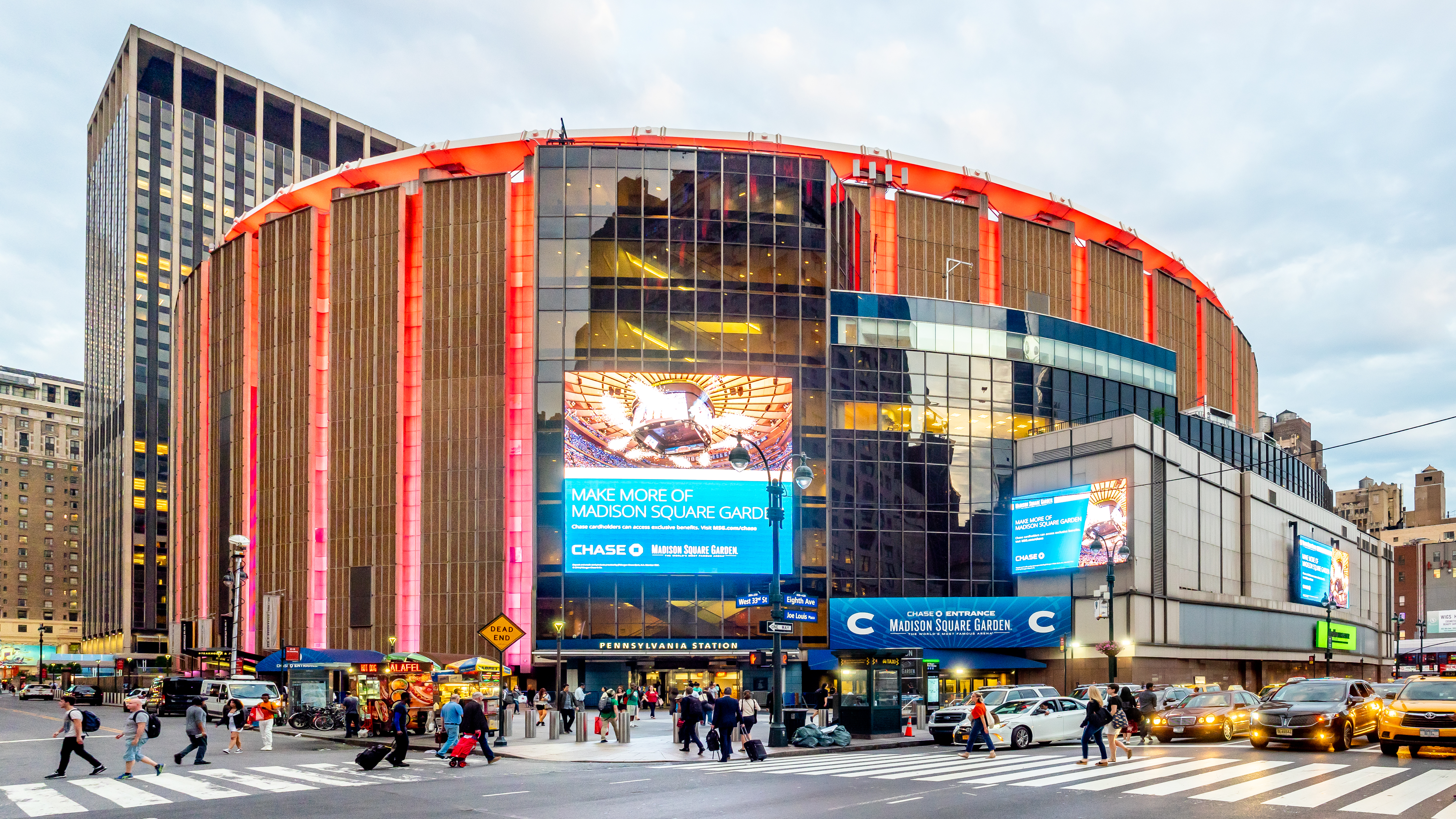
Madison Square Garden, long considered WWE's home arena, holds a number of pro wrestling attendance records.

The following is a list of the largest attendances in the history of the American professional wrestling promotion WWE.

The list is dominated by WWE's flagship WrestleMania pay-per-view (PPV) event, which since 2007's WrestleMania 23 has been held exclusively in stadiums that typically have a seating capacity of at least 70,000 people or more. Only ten of the attendances listed are non-WrestleMania events, with The Big Event and Global Warning Tour: Melbourne being the only house show events on the list (although both events are listed on WWE Network as pay-per-view events on their pay-per-view list). All but eleven of the events included have been held in the United States where WWE is based, while three have been held in Canada, three in Japan, three in Saudi Arabia, two in Australia, and one in the United Kingdom.

== Events and attendances ==
Note: Minimum attendance of 40,000.

Event	Location	Venue	Attendance	Main event(s)	Notes
WrestleMania 32; April 3, 2016	Arlington, Texas	AT&T Stadium	80,709	Triple H (c) vs. Roman Reigns for the WWE World Heavyweight Championship	
SummerSlam; August 29, 1992	London, England	Wembley Stadium	78,927	Randy Savage (c) vs. Ultimate Warrior for the WWF World Heavyweight Championship; Bret Hart (c) vs. The British Bulldog for the WWF Intercontinental Championship	
WrestleMania III; March 29, 1987	Pontiac, Michigan	Pontiac Silverdome	78,000	Hulk Hogan (c) vs. André the Giant for the WWF World Heavyweight Championship	
WrestleMania 29; April 7, 2013	East Rutherford, New Jersey	MetLife Stadium	74,300	The Rock (c) vs. John Cena for the WWE Championship	
WrestleMania 23; April 1, 2007	Detroit, Michigan	Ford Field	74,287	John Cena (c) vs. Shawn Michaels for the WWE Championship	
WrestleMania XXVIII; April 1, 2012	Miami Gardens, Florida	Sun Life Stadium	78,363	John Cena vs. The Rock	
WrestleMania 31; March 29, 2015	Santa Clara, California	Levi's Stadium	76,976	Brock Lesnar (c) vs. Roman Reigns vs. Seth Rollins for the WWE World Heavyweight Championship	
WrestleMania 33; April 2, 2017	Orlando, Florida	Camping World Stadium	75,245	Roman Reigns vs. The Undertaker in a No Holds Barred match	
WrestleMania XXIV; March 30, 2008	Orlando, Florida	Florida Citrus Bowl	74,635	Edge (c) vs. The Undertaker for the WWE World Heavyweight Championship	
WrestleMania XXVI; March 28, 2010	Glendale, Arizona	University of Phoenix Stadium	72,219	The Undertaker vs. Shawn Michaels in a No Disqualification Streak vs. Career match	
WrestleMania XXVII; April 3, 2011	Atlanta, Georgia	Georgia Dome	71,617	The Miz (c) vs. John Cena for the WWE Championship	
Royal Rumble; February 1, 2025	Indianapolis, Indiana	Lucas Oil Stadium	70,343	Royal Rumble Match	
Super Show-Down; October 6, 2018	Melbourne, Victoria, Australia	Melbourne Cricket Ground	70,309	Triple H vs. The Undertaker in a No Disqualification Match	
WrestleMania 35; April 7, 2019	East Rutherford, New Jersey	MetLife Stadium	68,000-70,000	Ronda Rousey (c - Raw) vs. Charlotte Flair (c - SD) vs. Becky Lynch in a winner takes all triple threat match for the WWE Raw Women's Championship and the WWE SmackDown Women's Championship	
WrestleMania X8; March 17, 2002	Toronto, Canada	SkyDome	68,237	Chris Jericho (c) vs. Triple H for the WWE Undisputed Championship	
WrestleMania X-Seven; April 1, 2001	Houston, Texas	Reliant Astrodome	67,925	The Rock (c) vs. Stone Cold Steve Austin in a No Disqualification match for the WWF Championship	
WrestleMania VI; April 1, 1990	Toronto, Canada	SkyDome	67,678	Hulk Hogan (WHC) vs. The Ultimate Warrior (IC) - Title for Title for the WWF World Heavyweight Championship and WWF Intercontinental Championships	
WrestleMania 39 (Night 2); April 2, 2023	Inglewood, California	SoFi Stadium	67,553	Roman Reigns (c) vs. Cody Rhodes for the Undisputed WWE Universal Championship	
WrestleMania 39 (Night 1); April 1, 2023	Inglewood, California	SoFi Stadium	67,303	The Usos (Jey Uso and Jimmy Uso) (c) vs. Kevin Owens and Sami Zayn for the Undisputed WWE Tag Team Championship	
WrestleMania 38 (Night 2); April 3, 2022	Arlington, Texas	AT&T Stadium	65,653	Roman Reigns (Universal Champion) vs. Brock Lesnar (WWE Champion) in a Winner Takes All match for the WWE Championship and WWE Universal Championship	
WrestleMania 38 (Night 1); April 2, 2022	Arlington, Texas	AT&T Stadium	65,719	Stone Cold Steve Austin vs. Kevin Owens	
The Big Event; August 28, 1986	Toronto, Canada	Exhibition Stadium	64,000	Hulk Hogan (c) vs. Paul Orndorff for the WWF World Heavyweight Championship	
Clash at the Castle; September 3, 2022	Cardiff, Wales	Principality Stadium	62,296	Roman Reigns (c) vs. Drew McIntyre for the Undisputed WWE Universal Championship	
Wrestlemania VIII; April 5, 1992	Indianapolis, Indiana	Hoosier Dome	62,167	Ric Flair (c) vs. Randy Savage for the WWF World Heavyweight Championship; Hulk Hogan vs. Sid Justice	
SummerSlam (Night 2); August 3, 2025	East Rutherford, New Jersey	MetLife Stadium	60,561	John Cena (c) vs. Cody Rhodes for the Undisputed WWE Championship	
Royal Rumble; January 19, 1997	San Antonio, Texas	Alamodome	60,447	Sycho Sid (c) vs. Shawn Michaels for the WWF Championship	
WrestleMania XL (Night 2) April 6, 2024	Philadelphia, Pennsylvania	Lincoln Financial Field	60,203	Roman Reigns (c) vs Cody Rhodes for the Undisputed WWE Universal Championship.	
WrestleMania XXV; April 5, 2009	Houston, Texas	Reliant Stadium	60,203	Triple H (c) vs. Randy Orton for the WWE Championship	
WrestleMania XL (Night 1) April 5, 2024	Philadelphia, Pennsylvania	Lincoln Financial Field	60,036	Cody Rhodes and Seth Rollins vs Roman Reigns and The Rock to determine the stipulation for the Undisputed WWE Universal Championship match on Night Two.	
WrestleMania XXX; April 6, 2014	New Orleans, Louisiana	Mercedes-Benz Superdome	60,000-65,000	Randy Orton (c) vs. Batista vs. Daniel Bryan for the WWE World Heavyweight Championship	
Global Warning; August 10, 2002	Melbourne, Australia	Colonial Stadium	56,734	The Rock (c) vs. Triple H vs. Brock Lesnar for the WWF Undisputed Championship	
WrestleMania XIX; March 30, 2003	Seattle, Washington	Safeco Field	54,097	Kurt Angle (c) vs. Brock Lesnar for the WWE Championship	
SummerSlam (Night 1); August 2, 2025	East Rutherford, New Jersey	MetLife Stadium	53,161	Gunther (c) vs. CM Punk for the World Heavyweight Championship	
Royal Rumble; January 29, 2017	San Antonio, Texas	Alamodome	52,020	Royal Rumble match	
SummerSlam; August 21, 2021	Las Vegas, Nevada	Allegiant Stadium	51,326	Roman Reigns (c) vs. John Cena for the WWE Universal Championship	
WWF at the Ohio State Fair; August 13, 1985	Columbus, Ohio	Ohio State Fairgrounds	50,000	Hulk Hogan (c) vs. Big John Studd for the WWF World Heavyweight Championship	
Tribute to the Troops; December 11, 2010	Fort Hood, Texas	Fort Hood	50,000	John Cena, Rey Mysterio, and Randy Orton vs. Alberto Del Rio, Wade Barrett, and The Miz	
Royal Rumble; January 27, 2019	Phoenix, Arizona	Chase Field	48,193	30-man Royal Rumble match	
Royal Rumble; January 27, 2024	St. Petersburg, Florida	Tropicana Field	48,044	30-woman Royal Rumble match, Roman Reigns vs. Randy Orton vs. AJ Styles vs. LA Knight, Kevin Owens vs. Logan Paul, 30-man Royal Rumble match	
Royal Rumble; January 26, 2020	Houston, Texas	Minute Maid Park	42,715	30-man Royal Rumble match	
Raw Is War; February 8, 1999	Toronto, Canada	SkyDome	41,432	Steve Austin vs. Vince McMahon, Ken Shamrock, Test, Kane, Chyna and Big Boss Man in a 6 on 1 handicap elimination match	

Top 10 most-attended shows in the 1960s
No.	Promotion	Event	Location	Venue	Attendance	Main Event(s)
1.	CWC / FKE	Pat O'Connor vs. Buddy Rogers; June 30, 1961	Chicago, Illinois	Comiskey Park †	38,000	Pat O'Connor (c) vs. Buddy Rogers in a Best 2-out-of-3 Falls match for the NWA World Heavyweight Championship
2.	CWC	Buddy Rogers vs. Bobo Brazil; July 17, 1962	Washington, D.C.	D.C. Stadium †	20,959	Buddy Rogers vs. Bobo Brazil in a Best 2-out-of-3 Falls match for the NWA World Heavyweight Championship
3.	CWC	Buddy Rogers & Bob Orton vs. Johnny Valentine & Bearcat Wright; January 22, 1962	New York City, New York	Madison Square Garden	20,777	Buddy Rogers and Bob Orton vs. Johnny Valentine and Bearcat Wright in a Best 2-out-of-3 Falls match
4.	CWC	Buddy Rogers & Bob Orton vs. Johnny Valentine & Vittorio Apollo; May 26, 1961	New York City, New York	Madison Square Garden	20,702	Buddy Rogers and Bob Orton vs. Johnny Valentine and Vittorio Apollo
5.	CWC	Antonino Rocca & Johnny Valentine vs. The Fabulous Kangaroos; February 27, 1961	New York City, New York	Madison Square Garden	20,400	Antonino Rocca and Johnny Valentine vs. The Fabulous Kangaroos (Al Costello and Roy Heffernan)
6.	CWC	Buddy Rogers vs. Antonino Rocca; November 13, 1961	New York City, New York	Madison Square Garden	20,353	Buddy Rogers (c) vs. Antonino Rocca in a Best 2-out-of-3 Falls match for the NWA World Heavyweight Championship
7.	WWWF	Bruno Sammartino vs. Killer Kowalski; August 23, 1963	New York City, New York	Madison Square Garden	19,712	Bruno Sammartino (c) vs. Killer Kowalski for the WWWF World Heavyweight Championship
8.	WWWF	Bruno Sammartino vs. Gorilla Monsoon; November 18, 1963	New York City, New York	Madison Square Garden	19,706	Bruno Sammartino (c) vs. Gorilla Monsoon for the WWWF World Heavyweight Championship
9.	WWWF	Buddy Rogers vs. Bruno Sammartino; May 17, 1963	New York City, New York	Madison Square Garden	19,648	Buddy Rogers (c) vs. Bruno Sammartino for the WWWF World Heavyweight Championship
10.	WWWF	Bruno Sammartino vs. Bill Watts; March 29, 1965	New York City, New York	Madison Square Garden	19,614	Bruno Sammartino (c) vs. Bill Watts for the WWWF World Heavyweight Championship

Top 10 most-attended shows in the 1970s
No.	Promotion	Event	Location	Venue	Attendance	Main Event(s)
1.	WWWF	Showdown at Shea; June 25, 1976	New York City, New York	Shea Stadium	32,000	Antonio Inoki vs. Muhammad Ali fought in a Boxer vs. Wrestler match
2.	WWWF	Billy Graham vs. Bruno Sammartino; June 27, 1977	New York City, New York	Madison Square Garden	26,090	Superstar Billy Graham (c) vs. Bruno Sammartino for the WWWF World Heavyweight Championship
3.	WWWF	Bob Backlund vs. Ivan Koloff; August 28, 1978	New York City, New York	Madison Square Garden	26,000	Bob Backlund (c) vs. Ivan Koloff for the WWWF World Heavyweight Championship
4.	WWWF	Superstar Billy Graham vs. Dusty Rhodes; September 26, 1977	New York City, New York	Madison Square Garden	25,102	Superstar Billy Graham (c) vs. Dusty Rhodes for the WWWF World Heavyweight Championship
5.	WWWF	Bruno Sammartino vs. Waldo Von Erich; May 19, 1975	New York City, New York	Madison Square Garden	24,553	Bruno Sammartino (c) vs. Waldo Von Erich for the WWWF World Heavyweight Championship
6.	WWWF	Showdown At Shea; September 30, 1972	Flushing, New York	Shea Stadium	22,508	Pedro Morales (c) vs. Bruno Sammartino for the WWWF World Heavyweight Championship
7.	WWWF	Superstar Billy Graham vs. Bob Backlund; February 20, 1978	New York City, New York	Madison Square Garden	22,092	Superstar Billy Graham (c) vs. Bob Backlund for the WWWF World Heavyweight Championship
8.	WWWF	Superstar Billy Graham vs. Mil Máscaras; December 19, 1977	New York City, New York	Madison Square Garden	22,085	Superstar Billy Graham (c) vs. Mil Máscaras for the WWWF World Heavyweight Championship
9.	WWWF	Bruno Sammartino & Chief Jay Strongbow vs. The Valiants; October 7, 1974	New York City, New York	Madison Square Garden	22,000	Bruno Sammartino and Chief Jay Strongbow vs. The Valiants (Jimmy Valiant and Johnny Valiant) in a Best 2-out-of-3 Falls match
9.	WWWF	Bruno Sammartino vs. Stan Hansen; August 7, 1976	New York City, New York	Madison Square Garden	22,000	Bruno Sammartino (c) vs. Stan Hansen in a Steel Cage match for the WWWF World Heavyweight Championship
9.	WWWF	Bob Backlund vs. Ernie Ladd; October 23, 1978	New York City, New York	Madison Square Garden	22,000	Bob Backlund (c) vs. Ernie Ladd for the WWWF World Heavyweight Championship
10.	WWWF	Pedro Morales & Gorilla Monsoon vs. Luke Graham & Tarzan Tyler; July 24, 1971	New York City, New York	Madison Square Garden	21,912	Pedro Morales and Gorilla Monsoon vs. Luke Graham and Tarzan Tyler in a Best 2-out-of-3 Falls match

Top 10 most-attended shows in the 1980s
No.	Promotion	Event	Location	Venue	Attendance	Main Event(s)
1.	WWF	WrestleMania III; March 29, 1987	Pontiac, Michigan	Pontiac Silverdome	78,000	Hulk Hogan (c) vs. André the Giant for the WWF World Heavyweight Championship
2.	WWF	The Big Event; August 28, 1986	Toronto, Ontario	Exhibition Stadium	64,000	Hulk Hogan (c) vs. Paul Orndorff for the WWF World Heavyweight Championship
3.	WWF	WWF at the Ohio State Fair; August 13, 1985	Columbus, Ohio	Ohio State Fairgrounds	50,000	Hulk Hogan (c) vs. Big John Studd for the WWF World Heavyweight Championship
4.	WWF	Showdown at Shea; August 9, 1980	New York City, New York	Shea Stadium	36,295	Bruno Sammartino vs. Larry Zbyszko in a Steel Cage match
5.	WWF	WWF at the Michigan State Fair; August 28, 1985	Detroit, Michigan	Michigan State Fairgrounds	30,000	Hulk Hogan (c-WC) vs. Greg "The Hammer" Valentine (c-TTC) in a Champion vs. Champion match for the WWF World Tag Team Championship and WWF World Heavyweight Championship
6.	WWF	WWF on MSG Network; July 30, 1983	New York City, New York	Madison Square Garden	27,000	Bob Backlund (c) vs. George "The Animal" Steele for the WWF World Heavyweight Championship
7.	WWF	WWF on MSG Network; January 23, 1984	New York City, New York	Madison Square Garden	26,292	Iron Sheik (c) vs. Hulk Hogan for the WWF World Heavyweight Championship
8.	WWF	WWF on MSG Network; March 20, 1983	New York City, New York	Madison Square Garden	26,109	Bob Backlund (c-HC) vs. Don Muraco (c-IC) in a "Champion vs. Champion" Texas Death match for the WWF Heavyweight Championship and WWF Intercontinental Championship
9.	WWF	WWF on MSG Network; March 24, 1980	New York City, New York	Madison Square Garden	26,102	Bob Backlund (c) vs. Sika for the WWF Heavyweight Championship
10.	WWF	All American Wrestling; February 20, 1984	New York City, New York	Madison Square Garden	26,092 (Note: This included 4,000 at Felt Forum.)	Hulk Hogan (c) vs. Paul Orndorff for the WWF World Heavyweight Championship
10.	WWF	Championship Wrestling; March 25, 1984	New York City, New York	Madison Square Garden	26,092	Bob Backlund vs. Greg Valentine
10.	WWF	All American Wrestling; June 16, 1984	New York City, New York	Madison Square Garden	26,092	Sgt. Slaughter vs. The Iron Sheik in a Bootcamp match
10.	WWF	Prime Time Wrestling; December 28, 1984	New York City, New York	Madison Square Garden	26,092	Hulk Hogan (c) vs. The Iron Sheik for the WWF World Heavyweight Championship
10.	WWF	The War To Settle The Score; February 18, 1985	New York City, New York	Madison Square Garden	26,092	Hulk Hogan (c) vs. Roddy Piper for the WWF World Heavyweight Championship

Top 10 most-attended shows in the 1990s
No.	Promotion	Event	Location	Venue	Attendance	Main Event(s)
1.	WWF	SummerSlam; August 29, 1992	London, England	Wembley Stadium	78,927	Bret Hart (c) vs. The British Bulldog for the WWF Intercontinental Championship
2.	WWF	WrestleMania VI; April 1, 1990	Toronto, Ontario	SkyDome	64,287	Hulk Hogan (WHC) vs. The Ultimate Warrior (IC) in a champion vs. champion match for the WWF World Heavyweight and WWF Intercontinental Championships
3.	WWF	WrestleMania VIII; April 5, 1992	Indianapolis, Indiana	Hoosier Dome	62,167	Hulk Hogan vs. Sid Justice
4.	WWF	Royal Rumble; January 19, 1997	San Antonio, Texas	Alamodome	60,447	Sycho Sid (c) vs. Shawn Michaels for the WWF Championship
5.	AJPW / NJPW / WWF	The US/Japan Wrestling Summit; April 13, 1990	Tokyo, Japan	Tokyo Dome †	53,742	Hulk Hogan (WWF) vs. Stan Hansen (AJPW)
6.	SWS / WWF	WrestleFest; March 30, 1991	Tokyo, Japan	Tokyo Dome †	42,000	Hulk Hogan and Genichiro Tenryu vs. The Legion of Doom (Hawk and Animal)
7.	WWF	WWF Raw; February 8, 1999	Toronto, Ontario	SkyDome	41,432	Steve Austin vs. Vince McMahon, Ken Shamrock, Test, Kane, Chyna and Big Boss Man in a handicap elimination match
8.	SWS / WWF	SuperWrestle; December 12, 1991	Tokyo, Japan	Tokyo Dome †	40,000	Genichiro Tenryu vs. Hulk Hogan
9.	WWF	WWF Raw is War (Ep. 333); October 11, 1999	Atlanta, Georgia	Georgia Dome	33,375	Val Venis and The British Bulldog vs. The Rock 'n' Sock Connection (The Rock and Mankind)
10.	WWF	WWF Live in Bangalore; February 4, 1996	Bangalore, India	Kanataka Football Stadium	30,000	Bret Hart (c) vs. Tatanka for the WWF World Heavyweight Championship

Top 10 most-attended shows in the 2000s
No.	Promotion	Event	Location	Venue	Attendance	Main Event(s)
1.	WWE	WrestleMania 23; April 1, 2007	Detroit, Michigan	Ford Field	74,287	John Cena (c) vs. Shawn Michaels for the WWE Championship
2.	WWE	WrestleMania XXIV; March 30, 2008	Orlando, Florida	Florida Citrus Bowl *	74,635	Edge (c) vs. The Undertaker for the WWE World Heavyweight Championship
3.	WWE	WrestleMania XXV; April 5, 2009	Houston, Texas	Reliant Stadium †	72,744	Triple H (c) vs. Randy Orton for the WWE Championship
4.	WWF	WrestleMania X8; March 17, 2002	Toronto, Ontario	SkyDome	68,237	Chris Jericho (c) vs. Triple H for the WWE Undisputed Championship
5.	WWF	WrestleMania X-Seven; April 1, 2001	Houston, Texas	Reliant Astrodome	67,925	The Rock (c) vs. Stone Cold Steve Austin in a No Disqualification match for the WWF Championship
6.	WWE	WWE Global Warning; August 10, 2002	Melbourne, Australia	Colonial Stadium †	56,734	The Rock (c) vs. Triple H vs. Brock Lesnar for the WWF Undisputed Championship
7.	WWE	WrestleMania XIX; March 30, 2003	Seattle, Washington	Safeco Field †	54,097	Kurt Angle (c) vs. Brock Lesnar for the WWE Championship
8.	WWF	WWF Raw is War (Ep. 352); February 21, 2000	Atlanta, Georgia	Georgia Dome	27,464	Triple H, X-Pac and Big Show vs. The Rock, Cactus Jack and Kane
9.	WWF	WWF Raw is War (Ep. 375); July 31, 2000	Atlanta, Georgia	Georgia Dome	25,000	The Rock and Lita vs. Triple H and Trish Stratus
10.	WWF	WWF Raw is War (Ep. 402); February 5, 2001	Atlanta, Georgia	Georgia Dome	24,639	The Rock and Kurt Angle vs. Steve Austin and Triple H

Top 10 most-attended shows in the 2010s
No.	Promotion	Event	Location	Venue	Attendance	Main Event(s)
1.	WWE	WrestleMania 32; April 3, 2016	Arlington, Texas	AT&T Stadium^{†}	80,709	Triple H (c) vs. Roman Reigns for the WWE World Heavyweight Championship
2.	WWE	WrestleMania XXVIII; April 1, 2012	Miami Gardens, Florida	Sun Life Stadium *	78,363	John Cena vs. The Rock
3.	WWE	WrestleMania 34; April 8, 2018	New Orleans, Louisiana	Mercedes-Benz Superdome	78,133	Brock Lesnar (c) vs. Roman Reigns for the WWE Universal Championship
4.	WWE	WrestleMania 31; March 29, 2015	Santa Clara, California	Levi's Stadium *	76,976	Brock Lesnar (c) vs. Roman Reigns vs. Seth Rollins for the WWE World Heavyweight Championship
5.	WWE	WrestleMania 33; April 2, 2017	Orlando, Florida	Camping World Stadium *	75,245	Roman Reigns vs. The Undertaker in a No Holds Barred match
6.	WWE	WrestleMania XXVI; March 28, 2010	Glendale, Arizona	University of Phoenix Stadium †	72,219	The Undertaker vs. Shawn Michaels in a No Disqualification Streak vs. Career match
7.	WWE	WrestleMania XXVII; April 3, 2011	Atlanta, Georgia	Georgia Dome	71,617	The Miz (c) vs. John Cena for the WWE Championship
8.	WWE	WWE Super Show-Down; October 6, 2018	Melbourne Cricket Ground	Melbourne, Australia	70,309	The Undertaker vs. Triple H in a No Disqualification match
9.	WWE	WrestleMania 35; April 7, 2019	East Rutherford, New Jersey	MetLife Stadium	68,000-70,000	Ronda Rousey (c - Raw) vs. Charlotte Flair (c - SD) vs. Becky Lynch in a winner takes all triple threat match for the WWE Raw Women's Championship and the WWE SmackDown Women's Championship
10.	WWE	WrestleMania XXX; April 6, 2014	New Orleans, Louisiana	Mercedes-Benz Superdome	60,000-65,000	Randy Orton (c) vs. Batista vs. Daniel Bryan for the WWE World Heavyweight Championship

== Notes ==
† Retractable roof stadium
* Open air venue
** Total combined attendance was 40,085

== See also ==
- List of professional wrestling attendance records
- List of WWE pay-per-view and livestreaming supercards
