= Toreo =

Toreo may refer to:

- Bullfighting
- Sildenafil mouth spray, by trade name
- Toreo de Cuatro Caminos, a former bullring and landmark area in Naucalpan, State of Mexico
  - Cuatro Caminos metro station (Naucalpan), a Mexico City Metro station commonly known as Toreo
  - Toreo Parque Central, a mixed-use shopping center built where the bullring stood
