= Plaza de toros El Progreso disaster =

1965 crowd crush in Mexico

- Date: 31 January 1965; 61 years ago
- Venue: Plaza de toros El Progreso
- Location: Guadalajara, Mexico; 20°40′36″N 103°20′19″W
- Cause: Crowd collision
- Participants: Fans of several Mexican singers and musicians
- Deaths: 19
- Injuries: 35

The Plaza de toros El Progreso disaster was a crowd crush that occurred in the Plaza de toros El Progreso at about 8:30 p.m. on 31 January 1965. The crush occurred at the tunnel and crew ramp of the venue, through which the people who had enjoyed the evening show of Mexican popular music were coming out and at the same time the public who would attend the night show was trying to enter.

The two crowds collided with each other, and as a consequence people were run over, causing some of them to be crushed, as others ran over them. The result was 19 people dead, and 35 injured.

Two shows had been scheduled for that Sunday, one in the evening at 5:00 p.m., and the second at night, at 8:30 p.m. The announced artists were the Hermanos Martínez Gil, La Rondalla Tapatía, Linda Vera, Los Dos Reales; a singer-songwriter and guitarist from El Salto, Mike Laure; Malú Reyes, Hermanas Huerta, Adolfo Garza, Pily Gaos, Mariachi Los Halcones, etcetera.

== See also ==
- Crowd collapses and crushes § Crowd "stampedes"
