= List of National Wrestling Alliance attendance records =

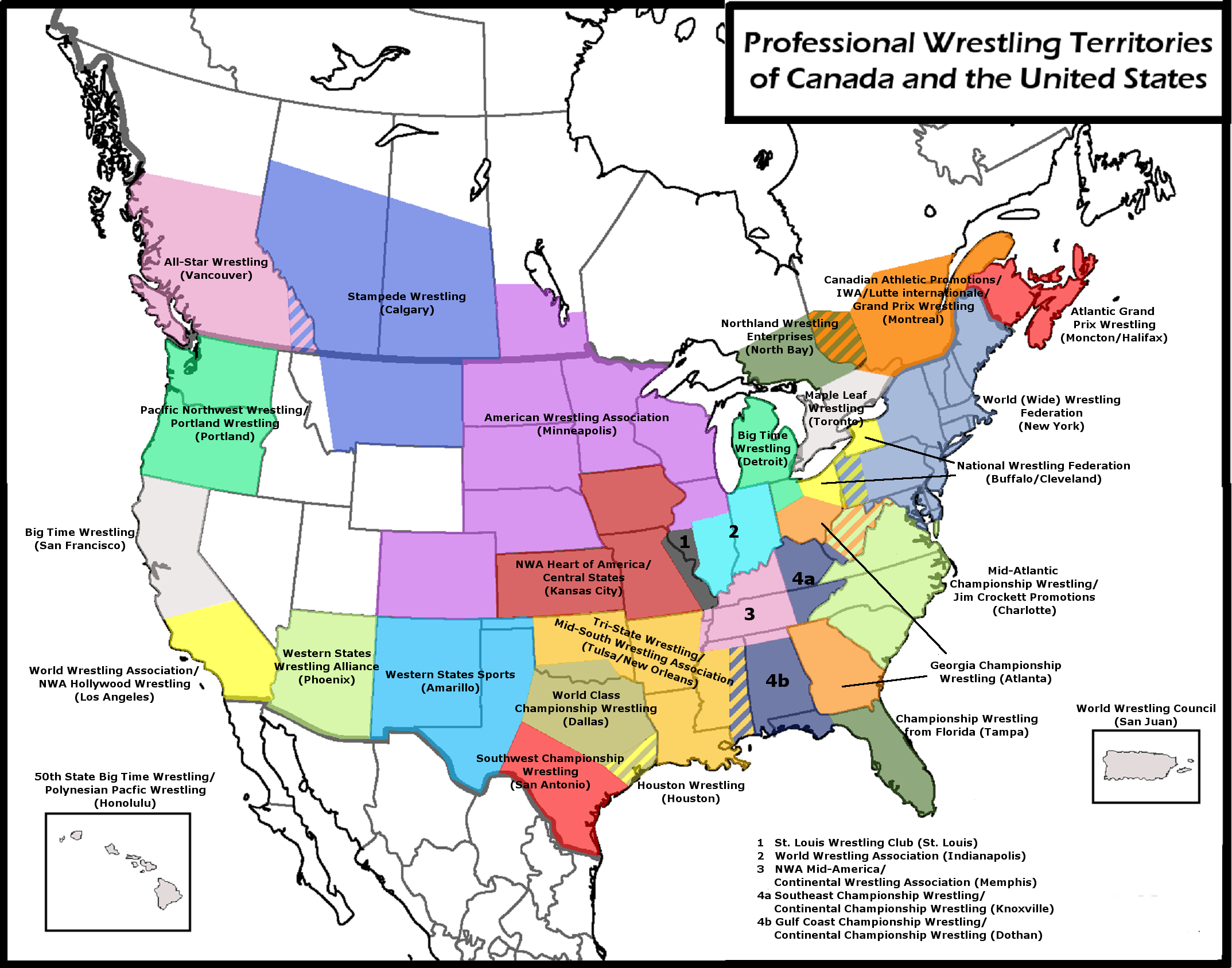
The original NWA territory system in North America (1940s-1980s).

The following is a list of National Wrestling Alliance attendance records. Founded in 1948, the National Wrestling Alliance controlled the professional wrestling industry in North America and other parts of the world during the "Territory-era" (1940s-1980s). All of the major NWA promoters were put out of business after the World Wrestling Federation began its national expansion under Vince McMahon, Jr. during the 1980s wrestling boom.

The two largest remaining members, New Japan Pro Wrestling (NJPW) and World Championship Wrestling (WCW) left the organization in 1993, however, the NWA continued to exist as a loose coalition of independent promotions until the mid-2010s. In 2017, the NWA was purchased by Billy Corgan and became a singular, independent promotion, putting an end to the NWA territory system.

The list is dominated by the American wrestling promotion World Wide Wrestling Federation (WWWF), a precursor to the modern-day World Wrestling Entertainment, which was operated by Vince McMahon, Sr. and Toots Mondt. Based in New York City, New York, they joined the NWA in 1957 as the Capitol Wrestling Corporation (CWC) with their territory eventually encompassing most of the Northeastern United States. Pat O'Connor vs. Buddy Rogers, co-promoted by the CWC and Fred Kohler Enterprises, was held at Comiskey Park on June 30, 1961, drawing a crowd of 38,000. It earned a then-record $141,345 (equivalent to US$1,522,843 in 2025) at the gate and is most attended NWA live event of all time. On January 24, 1963, McMahon and Mondt left the NWA and began promoting their own world champion under the WWWF banner. McMahon rejoined the NWA in 1971 and remained a member until his son, Vince McMahon, Jr., finally split from the organization in 1983.

The Japan Pro Wrestling Alliance (JWA) and World Wrestling Council (WWC) are tied for the second highest number of shows with 5 each. At the height of its power, NWA-affiliated promotions held events at indoor arenas and sports stadiums that typically had a seating capacity of at least 20,000 people or more, and in which the NWA World Heavyweight Championship was often contested in the main event. All but sixteen of the events have been held in United States, while five have been held in Japan and Puerto Rico, four in Mexico and two in Canada.

== Events and attendances ==
Promotion	Event	Location	Venue	Attendance	Main Event(s)
FKE / CWC	Pat O'Connor vs. Buddy Rogers; June 30, 1961	Chicago, Illinois	Comiskey Park †	38,000	Pat O'Connor (c) vs. Buddy Rogers in a Best 2-out-of-3 Falls match for the NWA World Heavyweight Championship
JWA	World Big League; May 7, 1961	Nara, Japan	Ayame Pond Amusement Park	36,000	Rikidozan and Toyonobori vs. Jim Wright and Mr. X in a Best 2-out-of-3 Falls match
WCCW	David Von Erich Memorial Parade of Champions; May 6, 1984	Irving, Texas	Texas Stadium †	32,132	Ric Flair (c) vs. Kerry Von Erich for the NWA World Heavyweight Championship
WWWF	Showdown at Shea; June 25, 1976	New York City, New York	Shea Stadium	32,000	Antonio Inoki vs. Muhammad Ali in a Boxer vs. Wrestler match
WWC	WWC Aniversario; September 17, 1983	San Juan, Puerto Rico	Hiram Bithorn Stadium	32,000	Abdullah the Butcher vs. André the Giant
TSW	Superdome Extravaganza; July 22, 1978	New Orleans, Louisiana	Louisiana Superdome †	31,000	Ray Candy vs. Ernie Ladd in a steel cage match
FKE	Pat O'Connor vs. Yukon Eric; July 29, 1960	Chicago, Illinois	Comiskey Park †	30,275	Pat O'Connor (c) vs. Yukon Eric in a Best 2-out-of-3 Falls match for the NWA World Heavyweight Championship
WCCW	Cotton Bowl Extravaganza '85; October 6, 1985	Dallas, Texas	Cotton Bowl †	30,214	The Von Erichs (Kerry and Kevin Von Erich) vs. The Dynamic Duo (Chris Adams and Gino Hernandez) in a Hair vs. Hair match
JWA	JWA Pro-Wrestling World Championship Series (Day 1); October 7, 1957	Tokyo, Japan	Korakuen Stadium	30,000	Lou Thesz (c) vs. Rikidozan for the NWA World Heavyweight Championship
JWA	JWA Pro-Wrestling World Championship Series (Day 2); October 13, 1957	Osaka, Japan	Ogimachi Pool	30,000	Lou Thesz (c) vs. Rikidozan in a Best 2-out-of-3 Falls match for the NWA World Heavyweight Championship
WWC	Carlos Colón vs. Ric Flair; April 3, 1983	Bayamón, Puerto Rico	Juan Ramón Loubriel Stadium	30,000	Carlos Colón (c) vs. Ric Flair in a steel cage match for the WWC Universal Heavyweight Championship
WWC	WWC Aniversario; September 15, 1984	San Juan, Puerto Rico	Roberto Clemente Coliseum	29,000	Stan Hansen and Bruiser Brody (c) vs. Abdullah the Butcher and Carlos Colón for the PWF World Tag Team Championship
EMLL	Blue Demon vs. El Santo; September 27, 1953	Mexico City, Mexico	Plaza de Toros	28,000	Blue Demon (c) vs. El Santo for the NWA World Welterweight Championship
JCP	Great American Bash; July 6, 1985	Charlotte, North Carolina	American Legion Memorial Stadium	27,000	Ric Flair (c) vs. Nikita Koloff for the NWA World Heavyweight Championship with David Crockett as special referee
FKE	Killer Kowalski vs. Bearcat Wright; September 16, 1960	Chicago, Illinois	Comiskey Park †	26,731	Killer Kowalski vs. Bearcat Wright in a Best 2-out-of-3 Falls match
BTW	Parade of Champions; June 24, 1972	Irving, Texas	Texas Stadium †	26,339	Dory Funk Jr. (c) vs. Fritz Von Erich for the NWA World Heavyweight Championship
WCCW	2nd Annual Von Erich Memorial Parade of Champions; May 5, 1985	Irving, Texas	Texas Stadium †	26,153	Kerry Von Erich vs. One Man Gang. Per the pre-match stipulation, One Man Gang would earn a match against Fritz Von Erich but if Kerry won manager Gary Hart would have his head shaved.
WWWF	Billy Graham vs. Bruno Sammartino; June 27, 1977	New York City, New York	Madison Square Garden	26,090	Superstar Billy Graham (c) vs. Bruno Sammartino for the WWWF World Heavyweight Championship
WWWF	Bob Backlund vs. Ivan Koloff; August 28, 1978	New York City, New York	Madison Square Garden	26,000	Bob Backlund (c) vs. Ivan Koloff for the WWWF World Heavyweight Championship
NWA-HW	Fred Blassie vs. John Tolos; August 27, 1971	Los Angeles, California	Los Angeles Memorial Coliseum †	25,847	Fred Blassie vs. John Tolos in a Best 2-out-of-3 Falls match
IWA	Édouard Carpentier vs. Buddy Rogers; July 21, 1960	Montreal, Canada	Delorimier Stadium †	25,703	Édouard Carpentier vs. Buddy Rogers in a Best 2-out-of-3 Falls match
JDE	Lou Thesz vs. Baron Michele Leone; May 21, 1952	Los Angeles, California	Gilmore Baseball Park †	25,256	Lou Thesz (c) vs. Baron Michele Leone in a Best 2-out-of-3 Falls unification match for the NWA World Heavyweight Championship and World Heavyweight Championship
WWWF	Superstar Billy Graham vs. Dusty Rhodes; September 26, 1977	New York City, New York	Madison Square Garden	25,102	Superstar Billy Graham (c) vs. Dusty Rhodes for the WWWF World Heavyweight Championship
EMLL	Blue Demon vs. Tony Borne; November 27, 1953	Mexico City, Mexico	Plaza de Toros	25,000	Blue Demon vs. Tony Borne in a Mask vs. Hair/Beard match
JWA	JWA International Big Competition (Day 10); August 1, 1955	Osaka, Japan	Ogimachi Pool	25,000	Mitsuhiro Rikidozan and Kin'ichi Azumafuji (c) vs. Jesús Ortega and Bud Curtis in a Best 2-out-of-3 Falls match for the NWA Hawaii Tag Team Championship
EMLL	Black Shadow vs. Tony Borne; October 30, 1958	Mexico City, Mexico	Plaza de Toros	25,000	Black Shadow vs. Tony Borne in a Hair vs. Hair match
JWA	Summer Series I (Day 15); August 14, 1967	Osaka, Japan	Osaka Baseball Stadium	25,000	Giant Baba (c) vs. Gene Kiniski in a Best 2-out-of-3 Falls match for the NWA International Heavyweight Championship
JCP	Great American Bash (Day 20); July 18, 1987	Charlotte, North Carolina	American Legion Memorial Stadium	25,000	Ric Flair (c) vs. Road Warrior Hawk for the NWA World Heavyweight Championship
WWWF	Bruno Sammartino vs. Waldo Von Erich; May 19, 1975	New York City, New York	Madison Square Garden	24,553	Bruno Sammartino (c) vs. Waldo Von Erich for the WWWF World Heavyweight Championship
WWC	Carlos Colón vs. Ric Flair; October 16, 1982	San Juan, Puerto Rico	Hiram Bithorn Stadium	24,000	Carlos Colón (c) vs. Ric Flair for the WWC World Heavyweight Championship
IWA	Édouard Carpentier vs. Antonino Rocca; July 18, 1956	Montreal, Canada	Delorimier Stadium †	23,227	Édouard Carpentier vs. Antonino Rocca
WWC	Carlos Colón vs. Ric Flair; January 6, 1983	San Juan, Puerto Rico	Hiram Bithorn Stadium	23,000	Carlos Colón (WWC) vs. Ric Flair (NWA) in a Champion vs. Champion match for the WWC World Heavyweight Championship and NWA World Heavyweight Championship
JCP	Great American Bash (Day 4); July 5, 1986	Charlotte, North Carolina	American Legion Memorial Stadium	23,000	Ric Flair (c) vs. Ricky Morton in a steel cage match for the NWA World Heavyweight Championship
WWWF	Showdown At Shea; September 30, 1972	Flushing, New York	Shea Stadium	22,508	Pedro Morales (c) vs. Bruno Sammartino for the WWWF World Heavyweight Championship
WWWF	Superstar Billy Graham vs. Bob Backlund; February 20, 1978	New York City, New York	Madison Square Garden	22,092	Superstar Billy Graham (c) vs. Bob Backlund for the WWWF World Heavyweight Championship
WWWF	Superstar Billy Graham vs. Mil Máscaras; December 19, 1977	New York City, New York	Madison Square Garden	22,085	Superstar Billy Graham (c) vs. Mil Máscaras for the WWWF World Heavyweight Championship
EMLL	Sugi Sito vs. El Santo; January 1, 1954	Mexico City, Mexico	Plaza de Toros	22,000	Sugi Sito (c) vs. El Santo for the NWA World Middleweight Championship

== Historical ==
=== Territory-era (1940s-1980s) ===
Top 10 most-attended shows in the 1940s
No.	Promotion	Event	Location	Venue	Attendance	Main Event(s)
1.	MVSC	Lou Thesz vs. Gorgeous George; January 28, 1949	St. Louis, Missouri	Kiel Auditorium	12,496	Lou Thesz (c) vs. Gorgeous George for the NWA World Heavyweight Championship
2.	MVSC	Lou Thesz vs. Antonino Rocca; February 25, 1949	St. Louis, Missouri	Kiel Auditorium	10,932	Lou Thesz (c) vs. Antonino Rocca for the NWA World Heavyweight Championship
3.	FKE	Don Eagle vs. Cyclone Anaya; November 18, 1949	Chicago, Illinois	International Amphitheater	10,745	Don Eagle vs. Cyclone Anaya in a Best 2-out-of-3 Falls match
4.	MVSC	Buddy Rogers vs. Don Eagle; February 4, 1949	St. Louis, Missouri	Kiel Auditorium	10,651	Buddy Rogers vs. Don Eagle
5.	MVSC	Buddy Rogers vs. Billy Darnell; April 1, 1949	St. Louis, Missouri	Kiel Auditorium	10,598	Buddy Rogers vs. Billy Darnell
6.	MVSC	Lou Thesz vs. Enrique Torres; January 14, 1949	St. Louis, Missouri	Kiel Auditorium	10,579	Lou Thesz (c) vs. Enrique Torres for the NWA World Heavyweight Championship
7.	MVSC	Bill Longson vs. Gorgeous George; March 11, 1949	St. Louis, Missouri	Kiel Auditorium	10,573	Bill Longson vs. Gorgeous George
8.	MVSC	Bill Longson vs. Primo Carnera; March 25, 1949	St. Louis, Missouri	Kiel Auditorium	10,466	Bill Longson vs. Primo Carnera
9.	MVSC	Buddy Rogers vs. Don Eagle; March 18, 1949	St. Louis, Missouri	Kiel Auditorium	10,276	Buddy Rogers vs. Don Eagle
10.	MVSC	Buddy Rogers vs. Bobby Bruns; January 7, 1949	St. Louis, Missouri	Kiel Auditorium	10,110	Buddy Rogers vs. Bobby Bruns

Top 10 most-attended shows in the 1950s
No.	Promotion	Event	Location	Venue	Attendance	Main Event(s)
1.	JWA	JWA Pro-Wrestling World Championship Series (Day 1); October 7, 1957	Tokyo, Japan	Korakuen Stadium	30,000	Lou Thesz (c) vs. Rikidozan for the NWA World Heavyweight Championship
1.	JWA	JWA Pro-Wrestling World Championship Series (Day 2); October 13, 1957	Osaka, Japan	Ogimachi Pool	30,000	Lou Thesz (c) vs. Rikidozan in a Best 2-out-of-3 Falls match for the NWA World Heavyweight Championship
2.	EMLL	Blue Demon vs. El Santo; September 27, 1953	Mexico City, Mexico	Plaza de Toros	28,000	Blue Demon (c) vs. El Santo for the NWA World Welterweight Championship
3.	JDE	Lou Thesz vs. Baron Michele Leone; May 21, 1952	Los Angeles, California	Gilmore Baseball Park	25,256	Lou Thesz (c) vs. Baron Michele Leone in a Best 2-out-of-3 Falls unification match for the NWA World Heavyweight Championship and World Heavyweight Championship
4.	JWA	JWA International Big Competition (Day 10); August 1, 1955	Osaka, Japan	Ogimachi Pool	25,000	Mitsuhiro Rikidozan and Kin'ichi Azumafuji (c) vs. Jesús Ortega and Bud Curtis in a Best 2-out-of-3 Falls match for the NWA Hawaii Tag Team Championship
4.	EMLL	Blue Demon vs. Tony Borne; November 27, 1953	Mexico City, Mexico	Plaza de Toros	25,000	Blue Demon vs. Tony Borne in a Mask vs. Hair/Beard match
4.	EMLL	Black Shadow vs. Tony Borne; October 30, 1958	Mexico City, Mexico	Plaza de Toros	25,000	Black Shadow vs. Tony Borne in a Hair vs. Hair match
5.	IWA	Édouard Carpentier vs. Antonino Rocca; July 18, 1956	Montreal, Canada	Delorimier Stadium	23,227	Édouard Carpentier vs. Antonino Rocca
6.	EMLL	Sugi Sito vs. El Santo; January 1, 1954	Mexico City, Mexico	Plaza de Toros	22,000	Sugi Sito (c) vs. El Santo for the NWA World Middleweight Championship
7.	IWA	Gene Kiniski vs. Killer Kowalski; July 17, 1957	Montreal, Canada	Delorimier Stadium	21,851	Gene Kiniski (c) vs. Killer Kowalski in a Best 2-out-of-3 Falls match for the MAC International Heavyweight Championship with Mike Mazurki as the guest referee
8.	IWA	Yvon Robert vs. Pat O'Connor; August 18, 1954	Montreal, Canada	Delorimier Stadium	21,616	Yvon Robert vs. Pat O'Connor in a Best 2-out-of-3 Falls match
9.	IWA	Édouard Carpentier vs. Killer Kowalski; August 15, 1956	Montreal, Quebec	Delorimier Stadium	21,454	Killer Kowalski (c) vs. Édouard Carpentier for the MAC World Heavyweight Championship with special referee Rocky Marciano
10.	CWC	Antonino Rocca & Miguel Pérez vs. Sheik of Araby & Bull Curry; October 20, 1958	New York City, New York	Madison Square Garden	20,793	Antonino Rocca and Miguel Pérez vs. Sheik of Araby and Bull Curry

Top 10 most-attended shows in the 1960s
No.	Promotion	Event	Location	Venue	Attendance	Main Event(s)
1.	FKE / CWC	Pat O'Connor vs. Buddy Rogers; June 30, 1961	Chicago, Illinois	Comiskey Park †	38,000	Pat O'Connor (c) vs. Buddy Rogers in a Best 2-out-of-3 Falls match for the NWA World Heavyweight Championship
2.	JWA	World Big League; May 7, 1961	Nara, Japan	Ayame Pond Amusement Park	36,000	Rikidozan and Toyonobori vs. Jim Wright and Mr. X in a Best 2-out-of-3 Falls match
3.	FKE	Pat O'Connor vs. Yukon Eric; July 29, 1960	Chicago, Illinois	Comiskey Park †	30,275	Pat O'Connor (c) vs. Yukon Eric in a Best 2-out-of-3 Falls match for the NWA World Heavyweight Championship
4.	FKE	Killer Kowalski vs. Bearcat Wright; September 16, 1960	Chicago, Illinois	Comiskey Park †	26,731	Killer Kowalski vs. Bearcat Wright in a Best 2-out-of-3 Falls match
5.	IWA	Édouard Carpentier vs. Buddy Rogers; July 21, 1960	Montreal, Canada	Delorimier Stadium	25,703	Édouard Carpentier vs. Buddy Rogers in a Best 2-out-of-3 Falls match
6.	JWA	Summer Series I (Day 15); August 14, 1967	Osaka, Japan	Osaka Baseball Stadium	25,000	Giant Baba (c) vs. Gene Kiniski in a Best 2-out-of-3 Falls match for the NWA International Heavyweight Championship
7.	CWC	Buddy Rogers vs. Bobo Brazil; July 17, 1962	Washington, D.C.	D.C. Stadium †	20,959	Buddy Rogers vs. Bobo Brazil in a Best 2-out-of-3 Falls match for the NWA World Heavyweight Championship
8.	CWC	Buddy Rogers & Bob Orton vs. Johnny Valentine & Bearcat Wright; January 22, 1962	New York City, New York	Madison Square Garden	20,777	Buddy Rogers and Bob Orton vs. Johnny Valentine and Bearcat Wright in a Best 2-out-of-3 Falls match
9.	CWC	Buddy Rogers & Bob Orton vs. Johnny Valentine & Vittorio Apollo; May 26, 1961	New York City, New York	Madison Square Garden	20,702	Buddy Rogers and Bob Orton vs. Johnny Valentine and Vittorio Apollo
10.	CWC	Antonino Rocca and Johnny Valentine vs. The Fabulous Kangaroos; February 27, 1961	New York City, New York	Madison Square Garden	20,400	Antonino Rocca and Johnny Valentine vs. The Fabulous Kangaroos (Al Costello and Roy Heffernan)

Top 10 most-attended shows in the 1970s
No.	Promotion	Event	Location	Venue	Attendance	Main Event(s)
1.	WWWF	Showdown at Shea; June 25, 1976	New York City, New York	Shea Stadium	32,000	Antonio Inoki vs. Muhammad Ali in a Boxer vs. Wrestler match
2.	TSW	Superdome Extravaganza; July 22, 1978	New Orleans, Louisiana	Louisiana Superdome †	31,000	Ray Candy vs. Ernie Ladd in a steel cage match
3.	BTW	Parade of Champions; June 24, 1972	Irving, Texas	Texas Stadium	26,339	Dory Funk Jr. (c) vs. Fritz Von Erich for the NWA World Heavyweight Championship
4.	WWWF	Billy Graham vs. Bruno Sammartino; June 27, 1977	New York City, New York	Madison Square Garden	26,090	Superstar Billy Graham (c) vs. Bruno Sammartino for the WWWF World Heavyweight Championship
5.	WWWF	Bob Backlund vs. Ivan Koloff; August 28, 1978	New York City, New York	Madison Square Garden	26,000	Bob Backlund (c) vs. Ivan Koloff for the WWWF World Heavyweight Championship
6.	NWA-HW	Memorial Coliseum Spectacular; August 27, 1971	Los Angeles, California	Los Angeles Memorial Coliseum	25,847	Fred Blassie vs. John Tolos in a Best 2-out-of-3 Falls match
7.	WWWF	Superstar Billy Graham vs. Dusty Rhodes; September 26, 1977	New York City, New York	Madison Square Garden	25,102	Superstar Billy Graham (c) vs. Dusty Rhodes for the WWWF World Heavyweight Championship
8.	WWWF	Bruno Sammartino vs. Waldo Von Erich; May 19, 1975	New York City, New York	Madison Square Garden	24,553	Bruno Sammartino (c) vs. Waldo Von Erich for the WWWF World Heavyweight Championship
9.	WWWF	Showdown at Shea; September 30, 1972	Flushing, New York	Shea Stadium	22,508	Pedro Morales (c) vs. Bruno Sammartino for the WWWF World Heavyweight Championship
10.	WWWF	Superstar Billy Graham vs. Bob Backlund; February 20, 1978	New York City, New York	Madison Square Garden	22,092	Superstar Billy Graham (c) vs. Bob Backlund for the WWWF World Heavyweight Championship

Top 10 most-attended shows in the 1980s
No.	Promotion	Event	Location	Venue	Attendance	Main Event(s)
1.	WCCW	David Von Erich Memorial Parade of Champions; May 6, 1984	Irving, Texas	Texas Stadium †	32,132	Ric Flair (c) vs. Kerry Von Erich for the NWA World Heavyweight Championship
2.	WWC	WWC Aniversario; September 17, 1983	San Juan, Puerto Rico	Hiram Bithorn Stadium	32,000	Abdullah the Butcher vs. André the Giant
3.	WCCW	Cotton Bowl Extravaganza '85; October 6, 1985	Dallas, Texas	Cotton Bowl †	30,214	The Von Erichs (Kerry and Kevin Von Erich) vs. The Dynamic Duo (Chris Adams and Gino Hernandez) in a Hair vs. Hair match
4.	WWC	Carlos Colón vs. Ric Flair; December 18, 1983	Bayamón, Puerto Rico	Juan Ramón Loubriel Stadium	30,000	Carlos Colón (c) vs. Ric Flair in a steel cage match for the WWC Universal Heavyweight Championship
5.	WWC	WWC Aniversario; September 15, 1984	San Juan, Puerto Rico	Roberto Clemente Coliseum	29,000	Stan Hansen and Bruiser Brody (c) vs. Abdullah the Butcher and Carlos Colón for the PWF World Tag Team Championship
6.	JCP	Great American Bash; July 6, 1985	Charlotte, North Carolina	American Legion Memorial Stadium	27,000	Ric Flair (c) vs. Nikita Koloff for the NWA World Heavyweight Championship with David Crockett as special referee
7.	WCCW	2nd Von Erich Memorial Parade of Champions; May 5, 1985	Irving, Texas	Texas Stadium	26,153	Ric Flair (c) vs. Kevin Von Erich for the NWA World Heavyweight Championship
8.	JCP	Great American Bash (Day 20); July 18, 1987	Charlotte, North Carolina	American Legion Memorial Stadium	25,000	Ric Flair (c) vs. Road Warrior Hawk for the NWA World Heavyweight Championship
9.	WWC	Carlos Colón vs. Ric Flair; October 16, 1982	San Juan, Puerto Rico	Hiram Bithorn Stadium	24,000	Carlos Colón (c) vs. Ric Flair for the WWC World Heavyweight Championship
10.	WWC	Carlos Colón vs. Ric Flair; January 6, 1983	San Juan, Puerto Rico	Hiram Bithorn Stadium	23,000	Carlos Colón (WWC) vs. Ric Flair (NWA) in a Champion vs. Champion match for the WWC World Heavyweight Championship and NWA World Heavyweight Championship
10.	JCP	Great American Bash (Day 4); July 5, 1986	Charlotte, North Carolina	American Legion Memorial Stadium	23,000	Ric Flair (c) vs. Ricky Morton in a steel cage match for the NWA World Heavyweight Championship

=== Modern-era (1990s-2010s) ===
Note: New Japan Pro Wrestling withdrew from the organization in February 1993, followed by World Championship Wrestling in September 1993.

Top 10 most-attended shows in the 1990s
No.	Promotion	Event	Location	Venue	Attendance	Main Event(s)
1.	NJPW / WCW	Fantastic Story in Tokyo Dome; January 4, 1993	Tokyo, Japan	Tokyo Dome	63,500	Genichiro Tenryu vs. Riki Choshu
2.	NJPW	G1 Climax (Day 3); August 10, 1992	Tokyo, Japan	Ryogoku Kokugikan	11,500	G1 Climax tournament quarter-finals
2.	NJPW	G1 Climax (Day 4); August 11, 1992	Tokyo, Japan	Ryogoku Kokugikan	11,500	G1 Climax tournament semi-finals
2.	NJPW	G1 Climax (Day 5); August 12, 1992	Tokyo, Japan	Ryogoku Kokugikan	11,500	G1 Climax tournament finals
2.	NJPW	Wrestling Scramble: Battle Zone Space I (Day 11); November 22, 1992	Tokyo, Japan	Ryogoku Kokugikan	11,500	The Great Muta (c) vs. Sting for the IWGP Heavyweight Championship
2.	NJPW	Wrestling Scramble: Battle Zone Space I (Day 12); November 23, 1992	Tokyo, Japan	Ryogoku Kokugikan	11,500	Masahiro Chono (c) vs. Scott Steiner for the NWA World Heavyweight Championship
3.	NJPW	Battle Final: Battle Final in Rainbow Hall (Day 8); December 11, 1992	Nagoya, Japan	Rainbow Hall	10,510	The Hell Raisers (Hawk Warrior & Power Warrior) vs. Scott Norton & Jim Neidhart
4.	WCW	The Real Event (Day 1); March 11, 1993	London, England	Wembley Arena	11,500	Big Van Vader (c) vs. Sting for the WCW World Heavyweight Championship
5.	WCW	The Real Event (Day 2); March 12, 1993	Birmingham, England	National Exhibition Centre	10,500	Sting & Dustin Rhodes vs. Barry Windham & Paul Orndorff in a Bunkhouse match
6.	WCW	The Great American Bash; July 7, 1990	Baltimore, Maryland	Baltimore Arena	10,000	Ric Flair (c) vs. Sting for the NWA World Heavyweight Championship
6.	WCW	WCW Worldwide; April 17, 1992	Augusta, Georgia		10,000	10-man Nintendo Top Ten Challenge tournament
7.	WCW	WrestleWar; February 25, 1990	Greensboro, North Carolina	Greensboro Coliseum	9,894	Ric Flair (c) vs. Lex Luger for the NWA World Heavyweight Championship
8.	WCW	Starrcade; December 29, 1991	Norfolk, Virginia	Norfolk Scope	9,000	20-man Battlebowl match
9.	WCW	Clash of the Champions XXIV; August 18, 1993	Daytona Beach, Florida	Ocean Center	8,903	Big Van Vader (c) vs. Davey Boy Smith for the WCW World Heavyweight Championship
10.	WCW	Halloween Havoc; October 27, 1991	Chattanooga, Tennessee	UTC Arena	8,900	Lex Luger (c) vs. Ron Simmons in a Best 2-out-of-3 Falls match for the WCW World Heavyweight Championship

Note: Total Nonstop Action Wrestling withdrew from the organization in May 2007.

Top 10 most-attended shows in the 2000s
No.	Promotion	Event	Location	Venue	Attendance	Main Event(s)
1.	NWA-MACW	The Next Revolution (Day 1); December 30, 2003	Guangzhou, China	Tianhe Gymnasium	7,500	Terry Taylor (c) vs. Steve Williams for the NWA Mid-Atlantic Heavyweight Championship
2.	NWA-MACW	The Next Revolution (Day 2); January 1, 2004	Guangzhou, China	Huadu Stadium	6,100	Steve Williams (c) vs. Terry Taylor for the NWA Mid-Atlantic Heavyweight Championship
3.	TNA	Lockdown; April 15, 2007	St. Charles, Missouri	Family Arena	6,000	Team Angle (Kurt Angle, Samoa Joe, Rhino, Sting and Jeff Jarrett) vs. Team Cage (Christian Cage, A.J. Styles, Scott Steiner, Abyss and Tomko) (with James Mitchell) in a Lethal Lockdown match with Harley Race as gatekeeper
4.	NWA-OVW	Christmas Chaos; January 31, 2001	Louisville, Kentucky	Louisville Gardens	5,010	Nick Dinsmore (c) vs. Chris Benoit for the NWA-OVW Heavyweight Championship
5.	TNA; APW	Impacto Total (Day 1); January 5, 2007	Lissabon, Portugal	Campo Pequeno Bullring	5,000	Kurt Angle vs. Samoa Joe in a singles match.
6.	NWA-OF / NWA-PE	NWA Wrestling Showcase; April 4, 2008	Newark, New Jersey	JFK Recreation Center	4,500	Judas Young (c) vs. Tom Brandi for the NWA Pro East Heavyweight Championship
7.	TNA	House Show; November 25, 2006	Monterrey, Nuevo León, México	Arena Coliseo de Monterrey	4,000	Kurt Angle vs. Abyss in a singles match.
7.	TNA	House Show; March 17, 2006	Plymouth Township, Michigan	Compuware Sports Arena	3,700	Christian Cage (c) vs. Jeff Jarrett for the NWA World Heavyweight Championship.
9.	TNA	Bound for Glory; October 22, 2006	Plymouth Township, Michigan	Compuware Sports Arena	3,600	Jeff Jarrett (c) vs. Sting for the NWA World Heavyweight Championship with Kurt Angle as special outside enforcer.
10.	NWA-MACW	The Next Revolution (Day 3); January 3, 2004	Guangzhou, China	Guangzhou Gymnasium	3,400	Battle royal

Top 10 most-attended shows in the 2010s
No.	Promotion	Event	Location	Venue	Attendance	Main Event(s)
1.	NWA-MACW	Halifax County Bash; January 29, 2011	South Boston, Virginia	Halifax County High School	2,300	Buff Bagwell vs. Rikki Nelson
2.	NWA-IWA	Wrestle-Fire-Works 2 July 13, 2010	Merville, France		2,000	Kim Kaycee (c) vs. Bulla Punk for the NWA European Women's Championship
2.	NWA-PWR	Oliver John vs. Kafu; September 18, 2011	Watsonville, California	Santa Cruz County Fair	2,000	Oliver John vs. Kafu
3.	NWA / ROH	Crockett Cup; April 27, 2019	Concord, North Carolina	Cabarrus Arena	1,300	Jim Crockett Sr. Memorial Cup Tag Team Tournament
4.	NWA	Summer Clash; July 14, 2014	Benton, Arkansas	Saline County Fairgrounds	1,200	Byron Wilcott (c) vs. Tim Storm for the NWA North American Heavyweight Championship
5.	NWA-MACW	Brawl For It All; February 27, 2010	Cheraw, South Carolina	Cheraw High School	1,100	The Rock 'n' Roll Express (Ricky Morton & Robert Gibson) vs. Buff Bagwell & Rikki Nelson
5.	NWA-IZW	Festival of the Southwest; May 8, 2010	Sierra Vista, Arizona	Fort Huachuca	1,100	The Native Warriors (Hawaiian Lion & The Navajo Warrior) vs. The Ballard Brothers (Shane Ballard & Shannon Ballard) in a Steel Cage match
6.	NWA-PWR	Oliver John vs. Atsushi Sawada; February 27, 2010	King City, California	Salinas Valley Fairgrounds	1,000	Oliver John (c) vs. Atsushi Sawada in a non-title Steel Cage match for the NWA Heritage Championship
6.	NWA-PWR	Oliver John vs. Atsushi Sawada; July 31, 2010	Watsonville, California	Santa Cruz County Fairgrounds	1,000	Oliver John (c) vs. Atsushi Sawada for the NWA Heritage Championship
7.	NWA-ICWA	Sunny Day; August 14, 2010	Fresnes-sur-Escaut, France		900	Battle royal
8.	NWA-PWF / WFAC	Wrestling For A Cause: Call To Arms	Tampa, Florida	Scottish Rite Pavilion	850	The Sheik (c) vs. Kazuchika Okada for the NWA North American Heavyweight Championship
9.	NWA-MACW	Night of Champions; March 13, 2010	Easley, South Carolina	Easley High School	800	The Rock 'n' Roll Express (Ricky Morton & Robert Gibson) vs. Buff Bagwell & Rikki Nelson
9.	NWA-ICWA	October Fest 2 October 2, 2010	Frameries, Belgium	Salle Max Audin	800	Greg Fury (c) vs. Teo Tispun for the NWA French Heavyweight Championship
9.	NWA-MACW	Fall Brawl; August 13, 2011	South Hill, Virginia	Park View High School	800	Christian York vs. Chris Hamrick
10.	NWA-PWR	Blue Demon Jr. vs. Oliver John; May 14, 2011	Turlock, California	Stanislaus County Fair	700	Blue Demon Jr. (c) vs. Oliver John for the PWR Heavyweight Championship

== See also ==
- List of professional wrestling attendance records
- List of professional wrestling attendance records in Canada
- List of professional wrestling attendance records in Europe
- List of professional wrestling attendance records in Japan
- List of professional wrestling attendance records in Mexico
- List of professional wrestling attendance records in Puerto Rico
- List of professional wrestling attendance records in the United Kingdom
- List of professional wrestling attendance records in the United States
- List of WWE attendance records

== Notes ==
- ^{†} Retractable roof stadium
- ^{*} Open air venue
