= List of professional wrestling attendance records =

List of the largest attendances in the history of professional wrestling

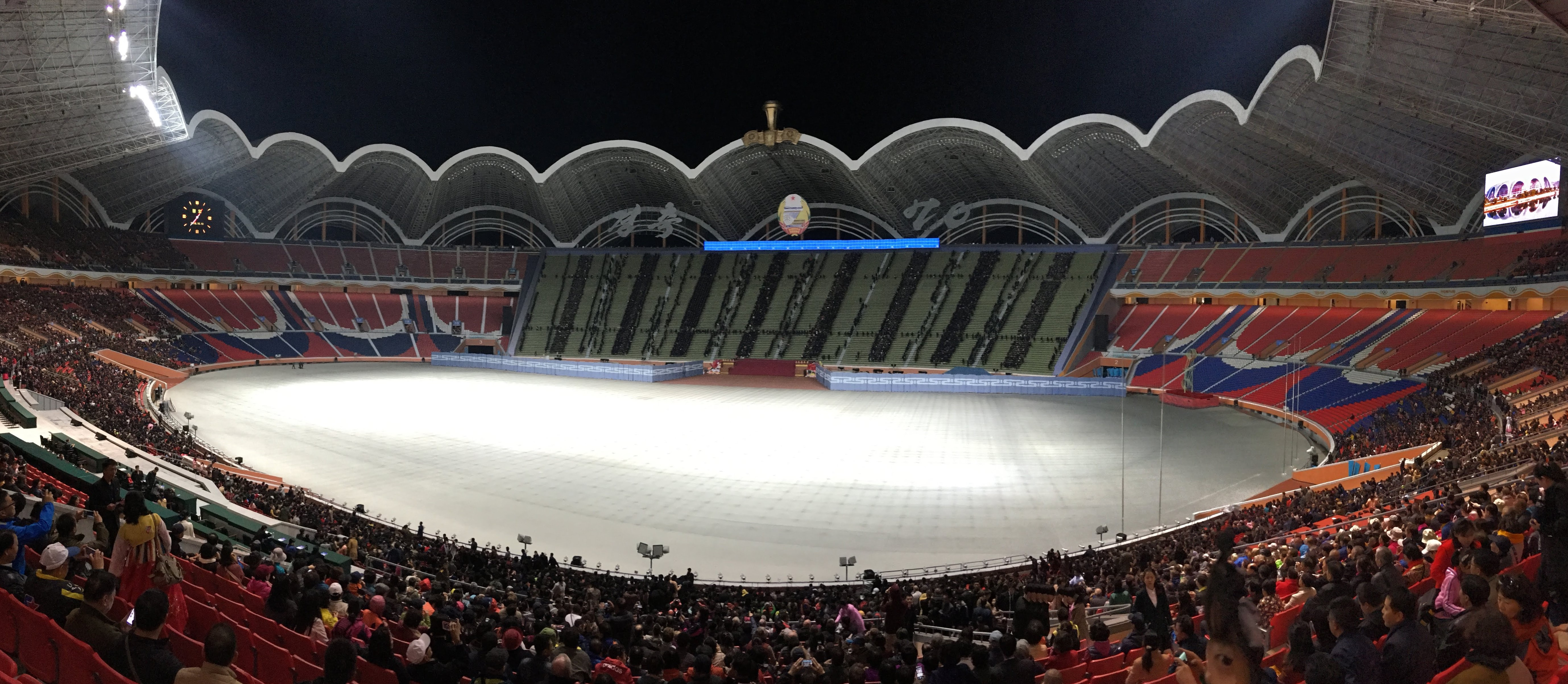
Collision in Korea, a two-day supercard co-promoted by NJPW and WCW held at Rungrado 1st of May Stadium (pictured in 2018), is the highest-attended wrestling event of all-time, with a combined attendance of 315,000.

The following is a list of professional wrestling attendance records.

New Japan Pro-Wrestling (NJPW), the largest professional wrestling promotion in Japan, have produced the most events on the list, with 44 (including co-promoted and multi-day events). NJPW hold the record for the highest attended event ever, with a combined attendance of 315,000 for Collision in Korea in 1995. Tokyo Pro Wrestling hold the record for highest attended event in Japan, with Battle Entertainment (Day 1) in 1996 having an attendance of 65,000.

WWE (previously WWF) hold the records for the highest attended event in North America, with WrestleMania 32 in 2016 having an attendance of 80,709, and the United Kingdom, with SummerSlam in 1992 having an attendance of 78,927. AAA hold the record for the highest attended event in Mexico, with Triplemanía I in 1993 having an attendance of 48,000. All Elite Wrestling (AEW) have produced the most recent addition to this list, with All In in 2026.

Some events have been excluded from this list because their existence cannot be credibly verified, including numerous large-scale events allegedly held in both India and Pakistan prior to 1970, such as Emile Czaja vs. Hamida Pahalwan in 1945, which claimed an attendance of 200,000. Verified events, largely from the Pioneer Era, have also been excluded due to unverifiable or inflated attendance figures, such as The Great Gama vs. Stanislaus Zbyszko held at White City Stadium in 1910, which claimed an attendance of 100,000.

== Events and attendances ==
Note: Minimum attendance of 40,000.

Promotion	Event	Location	Venue	Attendance	Main event(s)	Notes
NJPW / WCW	Collision in Korea (Day 2); April 29, 1995	Pyongyang, North Korea	May Day Stadium	165,000	Antonio Inoki vs. Ric Flair	(Note: NJPW announced the attendances as 165,000 for Day 1 and 190,000 for Day 2. However, Dave Meltzer of the Wrestling Observer Newsletter stated actual attendances were 150,000 and 165,000, respectively, with several attendees being ordered to attend by the state, or were admitted free of charge.)
NJPW / WCW	Collision in Korea (Day 1); April 28, 1995	Pyongyang, North Korea	May Day Stadium	150,000	Shinya Hashimoto (c) vs. Scott Norton for the IWGP Heavyweight Championship	
WWE	WrestleMania 32; April 3, 2016	Arlington, Texas	AT&T Stadium	80,709	Triple H (c) vs. Roman Reigns for the WWE World Heavyweight Championship	(Note: 80,709 is the turnstile attendance as disclosed by the Arlington, Texas police department; the figure of 101,763 is WWE's announced estimate including no-shows, complimentary tickets, and staff and stewarding.)
—	Jim Londos vs. Kola Kwariani; October 22, 1933	Athens, Greece	Panathenaic Stadium	80,000+	Jim Londos (c) vs. Kola Kwariani for the World Heavyweight Championship	(Note: There are different reports on the attendance of the event with numbers ranging from 60,000 to as high as 110,000 or 125,000.)
WWF	SummerSlam; August 29, 1992	London, England	Wembley Stadium	78,927	Bret Hart (c) vs. The British Bulldog for the WWF Intercontinental Championship	(Note: At the time of the event, "Macho Man" Randy Savage (c) vs. Ultimate Warrior for the WWF Championship was promoted as the top of the bill match. Retrospectively, WWE recognises Hart vs Bulldog as having been the main event.) (Note: 78,927 was the paid attendance for SummerSlam 1992; the total attendance for the event was 79,127.)
WWF	WrestleMania III; March 29, 1987	Pontiac, Michigan	Pontiac Silverdome	78,000	Hulk Hogan (c) vs. André the Giant for the WWF World Heavyweight Championship	
WWE	WrestleMania 23; April 1, 2007	Detroit, Michigan	Ford Field	74,687	John Cena (c) vs. Shawn Michaels for the WWE Championship	
WWE	WrestleMania 29; April 7, 2013	East Rutherford, New Jersey	MetLife Stadium	74,300	The Rock (c) vs. John Cena for the WWE Championship	
AEW	All In; August 27, 2023	London, England	Wembley Stadium	72,265	MJF (c) vs. Adam Cole for the AEW World Championship	(Note: 72,265 was the turnstile attendance as disclosed by Brent London Borough Council; 81,035 was the separate metric of tickets sold.)
WWE	Royal Rumble; February 1, 2025	Indianapolis, Indiana	Lucas Oil Stadium	70,347	30-man Royal Rumble match	
WWE	WrestleMania 39 (Night 2); April 2, 2023	Inglewood, California	SoFi Stadium	67,553	Roman Reigns (c) vs. Cody Rhodes for the Undisputed WWE Universal Championship	
WWE	WrestleMania 39 (Night 1); April 1, 2023	Inglewood, California	SoFi Stadium	67,303	The Usos (Jey Uso and Jimmy Uso) (c) vs. Kevin Owens and Sami Zayn for the Undisputed WWE Tag Team Championship	
WWE	WrestleMania XXIV; March 30, 2008	Orlando, Florida	Florida Citrus Bowl	65,700	Edge (c) vs. The Undertaker for the World Heavyweight Championship	
WWE	WrestleMania 38 (Night 1); April 2, 2022	Arlington, Texas	AT&T Stadium	65,719	Stone Cold Steve Austin vs. Kevin Owens	
WWE	WrestleMania 38 (Night 2); April 3, 2022	Arlington, Texas	AT&T Stadium	65,653	Roman Reigns (c - Universal) vs. Brock Lesnar (c - WWE) in a Winner Takes All match for the WWE and Universal Championships	
—	Jim Londos vs. Karl Zbyszko; December 9, 1928	Athens, Greece	Panathenaic Stadium	65,000	Jim Londos vs. Karl Zbyszko	
TPW	Battle Entertainment (Day 1); July 23, 1996	Atami, Japan	Atami Sun Beach	65,000	Abdullah the Butcher and Daikokubo Benkei vs. Kishin Kawabata and Takashi Ishikawa	
WWE	WrestleMania 33; April 2, 2017	Orlando, Florida	Camping World Stadium	64,900	Roman Reigns vs. The Undertaker in a No Holds Barred match	
WWE	WrestleMania XXVI; March 28, 2010	Glendale, Arizona	University of Phoenix Stadium	64,100	The Undertaker vs. Shawn Michaels in a No Disqualification Streak vs. Career match	
WWE	WrestleMania 35; April 7, 2019	East Rutherford, New Jersey	MetLife Stadium	63,000	Ronda Rousey (c - Raw) vs. Charlotte Flair (c - SD) vs. Becky Lynch in a Winner Takes All Triple Threat match for the WWE Raw Women's and the WWE SmackDown Women's Championships	
WWE	WrestleMania XXVIII; April 1, 2012	Miami Gardens, Florida	Sun Life Stadium	62,400	John Cena vs. The Rock	
WWE	Clash at the Castle; September 3, 2022	Cardiff, Wales	Principality Stadium	62,296	Roman Reigns (c) vs. Drew McIntyre for the Undisputed WWE Universal Championship	
WWE	Super Show-Down; October 6, 2018	Melbourne, Victoria, Australia	Melbourne Cricket Ground	62,000	Triple H vs. The Undertaker in a No Disqualification match	
WWE	WrestleMania XXVII; April 3, 2011	Atlanta, Georgia	Georgia Dome	61,846	The Miz (c) vs. John Cena for the WWE Championship	
WWF	WrestleMania VI; April 1, 1990	Toronto, Canada	SkyDome	61,846	Hulk Hogan (c - WHC) vs. The Ultimate Warrior (c - IC) in a Winner Takes All match for the WWF World Heavyweight and WWF Intercontinental Championships	
WWF	The Big Event; August 28, 1986	Toronto, Canada	Exhibition Stadium	61,470	Hulk Hogan (c) vs. Paul Orndorff for the WWF World Heavyweight Championship	
WWF	WrestleMania X-Seven; April 1, 2001	Houston, Texas	Reliant Astrodome	61,079	The Rock (c) vs. Stone Cold Steve Austin in a No Disqualification match for the WWF Championship	
WWF	WrestleMania X8; March 17, 2002	Toronto, Canada	SkyDome	61,069	Chris Jericho (c) vs. Triple H for the Undisputed WWF Championship	
WWE	SummerSlam (Night 2); August 3, 2025	East Rutherford, New Jersey	MetLife Stadium	60,561	John Cena (c) vs. Cody Rhodes for the Undisputed WWE Championship	
WWE	WrestleMania 41 (Night 2); April 20, 2025	Paradise, Nevada	Allegiant Stadium	60,343	Cody Rhodes (c) vs. John Cena for the Undisputed WWE Championship	
WWE	WrestleMania XL (Night 2); April 7, 2024	Philadelphia, Pennsylvania	Lincoln Financial Field	60,203	Roman Reigns (c) vs. Cody Rhodes in a Bloodline Rules match for the Undisputed WWE Universal Championship	
WWE	WrestleMania XL (Night 1); April 6, 2024	Philadelphia, Pennsylvania	Lincoln Financial Field	60,036	The Bloodline (The Rock and Roman Reigns) vs. Cody Rhodes and Seth "Freakin" Rollins in a tag team match	
WWE	WrestleMania XXX; April 6, 2014	New Orleans, Louisiana	Mercedes-Benz Superdome	59,500	Randy Orton (c) vs. Batista vs. Daniel Bryan in a Triple Threat match for the WWE World Heavyweight Championship	
WWE	WrestleMania 25; April 5, 2009	Houston, Texas	Reliant Stadium	58,200	Triple H (c) vs. Randy Orton for the WWE Championship	
WWE	WrestleMania 31; March 29, 2015	Santa Clara, California	Levi's Stadium	57,800	Brock Lesnar (c) vs. Roman Reigns vs. Seth Rollins in a Triple Threat match for the WWE World Heavyweight Championship	
WWE	WrestleMania 41 (Night 1); April 19, 2025	Paradise, Nevada	Allegiant Stadium	57,037	CM Punk (with Paul Heyman) vs. Roman Reigns vs. Seth Rollins in a Triple Threat match	
NJPW / UWFi	NJPW vs. UWFi; October 9, 1995	Tokyo, Japan	Tokyo Dome	57,000	Keiji Muto (c) vs. Nobuhiko Takada for the IWGP Heavyweight Championship	
NJPW	Antonio Inoki Retirement Show; April 4, 1998	Tokyo, Japan	Tokyo Dome	57,000	Antonio Inoki vs. Don Frye	
NJPW	Battle Formation; April 29, 1996	Tokyo, Japan	Tokyo Dome	55,000	Nobuhiko Takada (c) vs. Shinya Hashimoto for the IWGP Heavyweight Championship	
NJPW / WCW	Starrcade in Tokyo Dome; March 21, 1991	Tokyo, Japan	Tokyo Dome	54,500	Tatsumi Fujinami (c - IWGP) vs. Ric Flair (c - NWA) in a Champion vs. Champion match for the IWGP Heavyweight and NWA World Heavyweight Championships	
WWF	WrestleMania VIII; April 5, 1992	Indianapolis, Indiana	Hoosier Dome	54,000	Hulk Hogan vs. Sid Justice	
NJPW	Do Judge!! October 9, 2000	Tokyo, Japan	Tokyo Dome	54,000	Toshiaki Kawada vs. Kensuke Sasaki	
WWE	SummerSlam (Night 1); August 2, 2025	East Rutherford, New Jersey	MetLife Stadium	53,161	Gunther (c) vs. CM Punk for the World Heavyweight Championship	
NJPW	Super Fight in Tokyo Dome; February 10, 1990	Tokyo, Japan	Tokyo Dome	53,000	Antonio Inoki and Seiji Sakaguchi vs. Masahiro Chono and Shinya Hashimoto	
NJPW	Strong Style Symphony: New Japan Spirit; April 10, 1999	Tokyo, Japan	Tokyo Dome	53,000	Keiji Muto (c) vs. Don Frye for the IWGP Heavyweight Championship	
NOAH	Destiny; July 18, 2005	Tokyo, Japan	Tokyo Dome	62,000	Toshiaki Kawada vs. Mitsuharu Misawa	
NJPW	Indicate of Next; October 8, 2001	Tokyo, Japan	Tokyo Dome	61,500	Jun Akiyama and Yuji Nagata vs. BATT (Hiroshi Hase and Keiji Muto)	
NJPW	Battle Formation; April 12, 1997	Tokyo, Japan	Tokyo Dome	60,500	Shinya Hashimoto vs. Naoya Ogawa	
WWF	Royal Rumble; January 19, 1997	San Antonio, Texas	Alamodome	60,447	Sycho Sid (c) vs. Shawn Michaels for the WWF Championship	
UWF	U-Cosmos; November 29, 1989	Tokyo, Japan	Tokyo Dome	60,000	Akira Maeda vs. Willie Wilhelm in a Wrestler vs. Judoka match	
NJPW	Dome Impact; April 7, 2000	Tokyo, Japan	Tokyo Dome	60,000	Shinya Hashimoto vs. Naoya Ogawa	
WWE	Greatest Royal Rumble; April 27, 2018	Jeddah, Saudi Arabia	King Abdullah International Stadium	60,000	50-man Greatest Royal Rumble match	
AJPW	25th Anniversary Show; May 1, 1998	Tokyo, Japan	Tokyo Dome	58,300	Mitsuharu Misawa (c) vs. Toshiaki Kawada for the Triple Crown Heavyweight Championship	
NOAH	Departure; July 10, 2004	Tokyo, Japan	Tokyo Dome	58,000	Kenta Kobashi (c) vs. Jun Akiyama for the GHC Heavyweight Championship	
NJPW	Toukon Memorial Day; May 2, 2002	Tokyo, Japan	Tokyo Dome	57,000	Masahiro Chono vs. Mitsuharu Misawa	
WWE	Global Warning; August 10, 2002	Melbourne, Australia	Colonial Stadium	56,734	The Rock (c) vs. Triple H vs. Brock Lesnar in a Triple Threat match for the WWE Undisputed Championship	
NJPW	Wrestling Dontaku in Fukuoka Dome; May 3, 1993	Fukuoka, Japan	Fukuoka Dome	55,000	Antonio Inoki and Tatsumi Fujinami vs. Genichiro Tenryu and Riki Choshu	
NJPW	Final Power Hall in Tokyo Dome; January 4, 1998	Tokyo, Japan	Tokyo Dome	55,000	Kensuke Sasaki (c) vs. Keiji Muto for the IWGP Heavyweight Championship	
AJPW	Giant Baba Memorial Show; May 2, 1999	Tokyo, Japan	Tokyo Dome	55,000	Vader (c) vs. Mitsuharu Misawa for the Triple Crown Heavyweight Championship	
NJPW	Ultimate Crush; May 2, 2003	Tokyo, Japan	Tokyo Dome	55,000	Yuji Nagata (c - IWGP) vs. Yoshihiro Takayama (c - NWF) in a Title for Title match for the IWGP Heavyweight and NWF Heavyweight Championships	
WWE	WrestleMania XIX; March 30, 2003	Seattle, Washington	Safeco Field	54,097	Kurt Angle (c) vs. Brock Lesnar for the WWE Championship	
NJPW / UWFi	Wrestling World 1996; January 4, 1996	Tokyo, Japan	Tokyo Dome	54,000	Keiji Muto (c) vs. Nobuhiko Takada for the IWGP Heavyweight Championship	
NJPW / WCW	Fantastic Story in Tokyo Dome; January 4, 1993	Tokyo, Japan	Tokyo Dome	53,500	Genichiro Tenryu vs. Riki Choshu	
NJPW	Wrestling World 2000; January 4, 2000	Tokyo, Japan	Tokyo Dome	53,500	Genichiro Tenryu (c) vs. Kensuke Sasaki for the IWGP Heavyweight Championship	
NJPW / WCW	Wrestling Dontaku in Fukuoka Dome; May 1, 1994	Fukuoka, Japan	Fukuoka Dome	53,000	Antonio Inoki vs. The Great Muta	
NJPW	Strong Style Evolution; May 3, 1997	Osaka, Japan	Osaka Dome	53,000	Shinya Hashimoto (c) vs. Naoya Ogawa for the IWGP Heavyweight Championship	
WWE	Elimination Chamber: Perth; February 24, 2024	Perth, Western Australia, Australia	Optus Stadium	52,590	Rhea Ripley (c) vs. Nia Jax for the Women's World Championship	
NJPW	Battle 7 January 4, 1995	Tokyo, Japan	Tokyo Dome	52,500	Shinya Hashimoto (c) vs. Kensuke Sasaki for the IWGP Heavyweight Championship	
NJPW / BJW	Wrestling World 1997; January 4, 1997	Tokyo, Japan	Tokyo Dome	52,500	Shinya Hashimoto (c) vs. Riki Choshu for the IWGP Heavyweight Championship	
NJPW	Wrestling World 1999; January 4, 1999	Tokyo, Japan	Tokyo Dome	52,500	Scott Norton (c) vs. Keiji Muto for the IWGP Heavyweight Championship	
WWE	Royal Rumble; January 29, 2017	San Antonio, Texas	Alamodome	52,020	30-man Royal Rumble match	
FMW	5th Anniversary Show; May 5, 1994	Kawasaki, Japan	Kawasaki Stadium	52,000	Atsushi Onita vs. Genichiro Tenryu in an Exploding Barbed Wire Cage Deathmatch	
NJPW	Wrestling World 2001; January 4, 2001	Tokyo, Japan	Tokyo Dome	52,000	Kensuke Sasaki vs. Toshiaki Kawada in a tournament final for the vacant IWGP Heavyweight Championship	
NJPW	Wrestling World 2002; January 4, 2002	Tokyo, Japan	Tokyo Dome	51,500	Jun Akiyama (c) vs. Yuji Nagata for the GHC Heavyweight Championship	
WWE	SummerSlam; August 5, 2023	Detroit, Michigan	Ford Field	51,477	Roman Reigns (c) vs. Jey Uso in a Tribal Combat match for the Undisputed WWE Universal Championship and recognition of Tribal Chief of the Anoaʻi family	
—	Jim Londos vs. Dinarli Mehmed; August 2, 1936	Athens, Greece	Panathenaic Stadium	50,000+	Jim Londos vs. Dinarli Mehmed	(Note: There are different reports on the attendance of the event with numbers ranging from 50,000 to as high as 60,000.)
—	Jim Londos vs. Johannes van der Walt; July 25, 1937	Athens, Greece	Panathenaic Stadium	50,000+	Jim Londos vs. Johannes van der Walt	(Note: There are different reports on the attendance of the event with numbers ranging from 50,000 to as high as 70,000.)
—	Gino Garibaldi vs. Colonel Kobolo; 1927	Trieste, Italy	Unknown	50,000	Gino Garibaldi vs. Colonel Kobolo	
WWF	WWF at the Ohio State Fair; August 13, 1985	Columbus, Ohio	Ohio State Fairgrounds	50,000	Hulk Hogan (c) vs. Big John Studd for the WWF World Heavyweight Championship	
NJPW / WCW	Super Warriors in Tokyo Dome; January 4, 1992	Tokyo, Japan	Tokyo Dome	50,000	Tatsumi Fujinami (c – IWGP) vs. Riki Choshu (c – Greatest 18) in a Champion vs. Champion match for the IWGP Heavyweight and Greatest 18 Club Championships	
—	Weekly Pro Wrestling Tokyo Dome Show; April 2, 1995	Tokyo, Japan	Tokyo Dome	50,000	Shinya Hashimoto vs. Masahiro Chono	
FMW	6th Anniversary Show; May 5, 1995	Kawasaki, Japan	Kawasaki Stadium	50,000	Atsushi Onita (c) vs. Hayabusa in an Exploding Barbed Wire Cage Deathmatch for the FMW Brass Knuckles Heavyweight Championship	
NJPW	The Spiral; October 14, 2002	Tokyo, Japan	Tokyo Dome	50,000	Yuji Nagata (c) vs. Kazuyuki Fujita for the IWGP Heavyweight Championship	
NJPW	Nexess; May 3, 2004	Tokyo, Japan	Tokyo Dome	50,000	Bob Sapp (c) vs. Shinsuke Nakamura for the IWGP Heavyweight Championship	
WWE	Tribute to the Troops; December 11, 2010	Fort Hood, Texas	Fort Hood	50,000	John Cena, Rey Mysterio, and Randy Orton vs. Alberto Del Rio, Wade Barrett, and The Miz	
CWE	The Great Khali Returns (Day 2); February 28, 2016	Dehradun, India	Rajiv Gandhi International Cricket Stadium	50,000	Brody Steele (c) vs. The Great Khali for the CWE World Heavyweight Championship	
FMW	Barbed Wire Deathmatch Tournament; August 17, 1991	Tokyo, Japan	Torisu Stadium	48,221	Atsushi Onita vs. Sambo Asako in a No Rope Exploding Barbed Wire Deathmatch tournament final	
WWE	Royal Rumble; January 27, 2019	Phoenix, Arizona	Chase Field	48,193	30-man Royal Rumble match	
WWE	Royal Rumble; January 27, 2024	St. Petersburg, Florida	Tropicana Field	48,044	30-man Royal Rumble match	
AAA	Triplemanía; April 30, 1993	Mexico City, Mexico	Plaza de Toros	48,000+	Cien Caras vs. Konnan in a Best 2-of-3 Falls Retirement match	(Note: There are different reports on the attendance of the event with numbers ranging from 48,000 to 50,000.)
TVC	Médico Asesino vs. Gardenia Davis; October 3, 1954	Guadalajara, Mexico	Plaza de Toros el Progreso	48,000	Médico Asesino vs. Gardenia Davis	
NJPW	Battlefield; January 4, 1994	Tokyo, Japan	Tokyo Dome	48,000	Antonio Inoki vs. Genichiro Tenryu	
NJPW	Wrestling Dontaku in Fukuoka Dome; May 3, 1995	Fukuoka, Japan	Fukuoka Dome	48,000	Shinya Hashimoto (c) vs. Keiji Muto for the IWGP Heavyweight Championship	
NJPW	Jingu Climax; August 28, 1999	Tokyo, Japan	Jingu Stadium	48,000	The Great Muta vs. The Great Nita in a No Rope Exploding Barbed Wire and Explosive Barricades Land Mine Deathmatch	
NJPW	Final Dome; October 11, 1999	Tokyo, Japan	Tokyo Dome	48,000	Naoya Ogawa (c) vs. Shinya Hashimoto for the NWA World Heavyweight Championship	
NJPW	Ultimate Crush II; October 13, 2003	Tokyo, Japan	Tokyo Dome	47,000	Yoshihiro Takayama, Kazuyuki Fujita, Bob Sapp, Minoru Suzuki and Shinsuke Nakamura vs. Hiroshi Tanahashi, Manabu Nakanishi, Yuji Nagata, Hiroyoshi Tenzan and Seiji Sakaguchi in a 10-man elimination match	
NJPW	Wrestle Kingdom 20; January 4, 2026	Tokyo, Japan	Tokyo Dome	46,913	Kazuchika Okada (with Gedo) vs. Hiroshi Tanahashi; This was Tanahashi's retirement match.	
AEW	All In; August 25, 2024	London, England	Wembley Stadium	46,476	Swerve Strickland (c) vs. Bryan Danielson in a Title vs. Career match for the AEW World Championship	(Note: Turnstile attendance was recorded at 46,476 by Brent Council. Tickets sold – a separate metric – was reported at 53,385.)
UWFi	Pro-Wrestling World Championship: Takada vs. Vader; December 5, 1993	Tokyo, Japan	Jingu Stadium	46,168	Nobuhiko Takada (c) vs. Super Vader for the Pro-Wrestling World Heavyweight Championship	
NJPW	Toukon Festival: Wrestling World 2005; January 4, 2005	Tokyo, Japan	Tokyo Dome	46,000	Hiroshi Tanahashi (c) vs. Shinsuke Nakamura for the IWGP U-30 Openweight Championship	
WWE	SummerSlam; August 21, 2021	Las Vegas, Nevada	Allegiant Stadium	45,690	Roman Reigns (c) vs. John Cena for the WWE Universal Championship	
AJPW	2nd Wrestle-1; January 19, 2003	Tokyo, Japan	Tokyo Dome	45,371	Bob Sapp vs. Ernesto Hoost	
NJPW	Antonio Inoki vs. Bad News Allen; August 15, 1984	Islamabad, Pakistan	Almin Sports Center	45,000	Antonio Inoki vs. Bad News Allen	
NJPW	Rising the Next Generations in Osaka Dome; August 8, 1998	Osaka, Japan	Osaka Dome	45,000	Tatsumi Fujinami (c) vs. Masahiro Chono for the IWGP Heavyweight Championship	
WWE	Royal Rumble; January 29, 2022	St. Louis, Missouri	The Dome At America's Center	44,390	30-man Royal Rumble Match	
NJPW	Battle Satellite in Tokyo Dome; April 24, 1989	Tokyo, Japan	Tokyo Dome	43,800	Antonio Inoki (c) vs. Shota Chochishvili in a no rope martial arts match for the WWF World Martial Arts Heavyweight Championship	
NJPW	The Four Heaven in Nagoya Dome; August 10, 1997	Nagoya, Japan	Nagoya Dome	43,500	Shinya Hashimoto (c) vs. Hiroyoshi Tenzan for the IWGP Heavyweight Championship	
AJPW / NJPW / WWF	The US/Japan Wrestling Summit; April 13, 1990	Tokyo, Japan	Tokyo Dome	43,000	Hulk Hogan vs. Stan Hansen	
—	Inoki Bom-Ba-Ye; December 31, 2000	Osaka, Japan	Osaka Dome	42,753	Antonio Inoki vs. Renzo Gracie	
WWE	Royal Rumble; January 26, 2020	Houston, Texas	Minute Maid Park	42,715	30-man Royal Rumble match	
SWS / WWF	WrestleFest; March 30, 1991	Tokyo, Japan	Tokyo Dome	42,000	Hulk Hogan and Genichiro Tenryu vs. The Legion of Doom (Hawk and Animal)	
WWF	Raw Is War; February 8, 1999	Toronto, Canada	SkyDome	41,432	Vince McMahon, Ken Shamrock, Test, Kane, Chyna and Big Boss Man vs. Stone Cold Steve Austin in a 6-on-1 handicap elimination match	
WCW	Monday Nitro; July 6, 1998	Atlanta, Georgia	Georgia Dome	41,412	Hollywood Hogan (c) vs. Goldberg for the WCW World Heavyweight Championship	(Note: Total attendance 41,412. The paid attendance for the event was ~5000 less than the total attendance.)
AEW	All In; August 30, 2026	London, England	Wembley Stadium	41,102	Kenny Omega (c) vs. Will Ospreay for the AEW World Championship	
TVC	Médico Asesino vs. Tonina Jackson; February 28, 1954	Guadalajara, Mexico	Plaza de Toros el Progreso	41,000	Médico Asesino vs. Tonina Jackson in a Mask vs. Hair match	
FMW	4th Anniversary Show; May 5, 1993	Kawasaki, Japan	Kawasaki Stadium	41,000	Atsushi Onita vs. Terry Funk in a No Rope Exploding Barbed Wire Timebomb Deathmatch	
PWFG	Stack of Arms; October 4, 1992	Tokyo, Japan	Tokyo Dome	40,800	Masakatsu Funaki vs. Maurice Smith in a Different Style Fight	
NJPW	Wrestle Kingdom 14 (Day 1); January 4, 2020	Tokyo, Japan	Tokyo Dome	40,008	Kazuchika Okada (c) vs. Kota Ibushi for the IWGP Heavyweight Championship	
—	Jim Londos vs. Karol Zbyszko; December 2, 1928	Athens, Greece	Panathenaic Stadium	40,000+	Jim Londos vs. Karol Zbyszko	(Note: There are different reports on the attendance of the event with numbers ranging from 40,000 to as high as 50,000 or 65,000.)
—	Jim Londos vs. Jim Wright; October 3, 1956	Athens, Greece	Panathenaic Stadium	40,000	Jim Londos vs. Jim Wright	
AWA	Braves Field Show; July 30, 1935	Boston, Massachusetts	Braves Field	40,000	Ed Don George (c) vs. Danno O'Mahoney for the AWA World Heavyweight Championship	
NJPW	Antonio Inoki vs. Akram Pahalwan; December 12, 1976	Karachi, Pakistan	National Stadium	40,000	Antonio Inoki vs. Akram Pahalwan	
NJPW	Antonio Inoki vs. Billy Crusher; August 6, 1984	Peshawar, Pakistan	Peshawar Stadium	40,000	Antonio Inoki vs. Billy Crusher	
SWS / WWF	SuperWrestle; December 12, 1991	Tokyo, Japan	Tokyo Dome	40,000	Genichiro Tenryu vs. Hulk Hogan	
NJPW	Final Power Hall in Fukuoka Dome; November 2, 1997	Fukuoka, Japan	Fukuoka Dome	40,000	Keiji Muto and Masahiro Chono vs. Tatsumi Fujinami and Genichiro Tenryu	
NJPW	Wrestling World 2004; January 4, 2004	Tokyo, Japan	Tokyo Dome	40,000	Shinsuke Nakamura (c - IWGP) vs. Yoshihiro Takayama (c - NWF) in an Unification match for the IWGP Heavyweight and NWF Heavyweight Championships	
MPW	Sendai Television Broadcasting Festival: Happy!! Juni*Land (Day 2); November 5, 2006	Sendai, Japan	Sendai West Park	40,000	Jinsei Shinzaki and Shinjitsu Nohashi vs. Yoshitsune and Rasse	

== See also ==
- List of professional wrestling attendance records in Europe
- List of professional wrestling attendance records in Japan
- List of professional wrestling attendance records in Mexico
- List of professional wrestling attendance records in Puerto Rico
- List of professional wrestling attendance records in the United Kingdom
- List of professional wrestling attendance records in the United States
- List of WWE attendance records
