= Evita (actress) =

Mexican singer and actress

- Born: Eva Luisa Aguirre Muñíz; Guadalajara, Jalisco, Mexico
- Occupations: Television presenter, actress, singer
- Years active: 1963–1971

Eva Luisa Aguirre Muñíz, better known as Evita, is a Mexican television presenter, actor, and singer.

== Career ==
She began on Channel 4 in Guadalajara when Televicentro director Mario Rincón discovered her. She even had her own program called Niñerías con Hemostyl, sponsored by Hemostyl syrup. The program was later recorded and distributed to various television stations in Mexico.

She made her film debut in Ven a cantar conmigo (1967). The film was shot in Guadalajara and Chapala; Evita, accompanied by Robert Conrad and Alicia Bonet, showed the most important places of Guadalajara, such as the Hospicio Cabañas and the San Juan de Dios Market. She is also known for her starring roles in the Capulina films Mi padrino (1969) and El nano (1971).

She recorded several albums, including Ven a cantar conmigo with the songs of the film. The film and the album took her on a tour of Central and South America. But the most ambitious album was El rancherito Juan, where Ferrusquilla narrated a story and Evita sang different songs that spun the narrative.

== Personal life ==
Evita is the daughter of Mary Muñíz, so they started calling her Evita Muñíz, though she never used that name. Evita's family has always been linked to show business. Her mother, besides being the host of the program Club del hogar, formed a duet with her sister Patricia, and cumbia singer Linda Vera is her aunt.

== Filmography ==
Year	Title	Role
1967	Ven a cantar conmigo	Evita
1968	Un extraño en casa	Evita
1969	Mi padrino	Evita
1970	Jóvenes de la Zona Rosa	Evita
1971	El nano	Clarita
