= Ricardo Bell =

Ricardo Bell may refer to:

- Ricky Bell (singer) (born 1967), American singer
- Ricardo Bell (clown) (1851–1911), English clown and entrepreneur
