= List of professional wrestling attendance records in Mexico =

List of the largest attendances in the history of Mexican professional wrestling

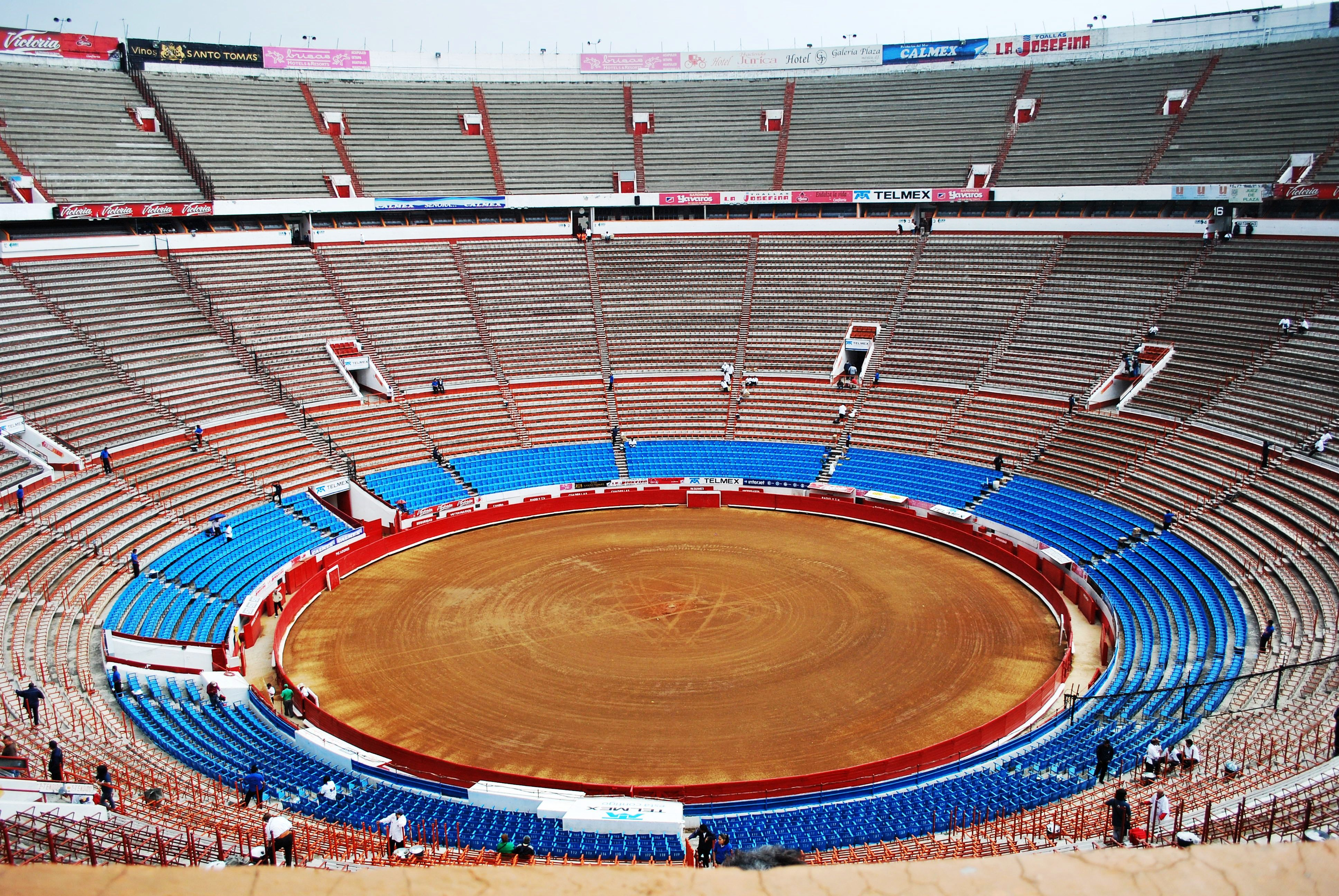
The Plaza de Toros México holds several Mexican attendance records. The inaugural Triplemanía, held at the venue on April 30, 1993, was attended by over 48,000 fans and is the highest attended professional wrestling event of all time.

The following is a list of professional wrestling attendance records in Mexico. The list is dominated by the now defunct Mexican professional wrestling promotion Universal Wrestling Association (UWA) which was the main rival of Empresa Mexicana de Lucha Libre (EMLL, now Consejo Mundial de Lucha Libre (CMLL)), Mexico's oldest professional wrestling promotion, during the 1970s and '80s. Televicentro Mexico (TVC), an early rival to EMLL, has two events on the list. The country's modern two biggest promotions, CMLL and Lucha Libre AAA Worldwide (AAA, originally Asistencia Asesoría y Administración), have seven and six events on the list, respectively. The U.S.-based WWE, which has controlled the industry in North America since 2002, has been slowly making inroads into the country holding several successful Raw and SmackDown television tapings at the El Palacio de los Deportes in Mexico City between 2006 and 2011. In 2025, WWE acquired AAA.

According to this list, three events are from AAA's flagship Triplemanía pay-per-view (PPV) event series, which since 1994's Triplemanía II-C has been held exclusively in stadiums that typically have a seating capacity of at least 20,000 people or more. The event series was created by Antonio Peña after breaking away from CMLL in 1992.

All but eleven of the events have been held in Mexico's capital city of Mexico City, while seven additional events have been held in the State of Mexico, and one each in Jalisco, Nayarit, and Querétaro.

== Events and attendances ==
Promotion	Event	Location	Venue	Attendance	Main Event(s)	Ref.
AAA	Triplemanía; April 30, 1993	Mexico City, Mexico	Plaza de Toros	48,000+ (Note: There are different reports on the attendance of the event with numbers ranging from 48,000 to 50,000.)	Cien Caras vs. Konnan in a Best 2-out-of-3 Falls Retirement match	
TVC	Medico Asesino vs. Gardenia Davis; October 3, 1954	Guadalajara, Mexico	Plaza de Toros el Progreso	48,000	Médico Asesino vs. Gardenia Davis	
TVC	Médico Asesino vs. Tonina Jackson; February 28, 1954	Guadalajara, Mexico	Plaza de Toros el Progreso	41,000	Médico Asesino vs. Tonina Jackson in a Mask vs. Hair match	
EMLL	Vincent Lopez vs. Man Mountain Dean; October 12, 1935	Mexico City, Mexico	Plaza Mexico	35,000	Vincent Lopez (c) vs. Man Mountain Dean for the World Heavyweight Championship	
UWA	Lou Thesz vs. Mil Mascaras; September 7, 1977	Naucalpan, Mexico	El Toreo de Cuatro Caminos	30,000	Lou Thesz (c) vs. Mil Mascaras for the UWA World Heavyweight Championship	
UWA	Tatsumi Fujinami vs. El Canek; June 12, 1983	Naucalpan, Mexico	El Toreo de Cuatro Caminos	30,000	Tatsumi Fujinami (c) vs. El Canek for the UWA World Heavyweight Championship	
AAA	AAA in Queretoro; May 28, 1993	Santiago de Querétaro, Mexico	La Arena Querétaro	30,000	Heavy Metal (c) vs. El Hijo del Santo for the Mexican National Welterweight Championship	
AAA	Lucha Libre Internacional; March 27, 2012	Tepic, Mexico	El Palenque de la Feria	30,000	El Mesías, Chris Masters and Shelton Benjamin vs. Carlito Caribbean Cool, La Parka and Luke Gallows	
AAA / NWA	The World is a Vampire: NWA vs. AAA; September 15, 2023	Iztacalco, Mexico City, Mexico	Foro Sol	30,000	Tyrus (c) vs. Daga for the NWA Worlds Heavyweight Championship	
EMLL	Blue Demon vs. El Santo; September 27, 1953	Mexico City, Mexico	Plaza de Toros	28,000	Blue Demon (c) vs. El Santo for the NWA World Welterweight Championship	
UWA	Lou Thesz vs. Mil Mascaras; August 15, 1977	Mexico City, Mexico	El Palacio de los Deportes	28,000	Lou Thesz (c) vs. Mil Mascaras for the UWA World Heavyweight Championship	
UWA	Colosal Torneo de la Muerte; August 22, 1982	Mexico City, Mexico	Palacio de los Deportes	28,000	Los Brazos (Oro and Plata) vs. El Enfermero #2 and Flama Azul in a double Mask vs. Mask tournament final	
UWA	El Canek vs. Dos Caras; October 4, 1983	Naucalpan, Mexico	El Toreo de Cuatro Caminos	28,000	El Canek (c) vs. Dos Caras for the UWA World Heavyweight Championship	
UWA	Torneo de la Muerte; May 1, 1975	Mexico City, Mexico	La Plaza de Toros	27,500	Dr. Wagner and El Halcon vs. The Twin Devils (Twin Devil #1 and Twin Devil #2) in a double Mask vs. Mask tournament final	
UWA	México contra el Resto del Mundo; December 19, 1979	Mexico City, Mexico	El Palacio de los Deportes	27,000	Tatsumi Fujinami (c) vs. Ángel Blanco for the WWF Junior Heavyweight Championship	
UWA	El Santo Retirement Show; September 12, 1982	Naucalpan, Mexico	El Toreo de Cuatro Caminos	25,500	El Santo, Gori Guerrero, Huracán Ramírez and El Solitario vs. Perro Aguayo, El Signo, El Texano and Negro Navarro	
EMLL	Blue Demon vs. El Santo; July 25, 1953	Mexico City, Mexico	Plaza de Toros	25,000	Blue Demon vs. El Santo in a Best 2-out-of-3 Falls match	
EMLL	Blue Demon vs. Tony Borne; November 27, 1953	Mexico City, Mexico	Plaza de Toros	25,000	Blue Demon vs. Tony Borne in a Mask vs. Beard match	
EMLL	Black Shadow vs. Tony Borne; October 30, 1958	Mexico City, Mexico	Plaza de Toros	25,000	Black Shadow vs. Tony Borne in a Hair vs. Hair match	
UWA	El Solitario vs. Tatsumi Fujinami; May 22, 1977	Mexico City, Mexico	El Palacio de los Deportes	25,000	El Solitario (c) vs. Tatsumi Fujinami for the UWA World Light Heavyweight Championship	
UWA	El Canek vs. Tatsumi Fujinami; May 1, 1983	Naucalpan, Mexico	El Toreo de Cuatro Caminos	25,000	El Canek (c) vs. Tatsumi Fujinami for the UWA World Heavyweight Championship	
UWA	UWA 9th Anniversary Show; February 12, 1984	Naucalpan, Mexico	El Toreo de Cuatro Caminos	25,000	El Canek (c) vs. André the Giant for the UWA World Heavyweight Championship	
AAA / CMLL	Padrísimo; June 17, 2000	Mexico City, Mexico	Plaza de Toros	25,000	Rayo de Jalisco Jr., Brazo de Plata, Octagón and La Parka Jr. vs. Shocker, Pierroth Jr., Cibernetico and Abismo Negro	
UWA	Bobby Lee & Villano III vs. Los Escorpiones; August 13, 1978	Mexico City, Mexico	El Palacio de los Deportes	24,000	Bobby Lee and Villano III vs. Los Escorpiones (Escorpión #1 and Escorpión #2) in a Mask and Hair vs. Masks match	
UWA	Bobby Lee vs. El Santo; September 24, 1978	Mexico City, Mexico	El Palacio de los Deportes	24,000	El Santo vs. Bobby Lee in a Mask vs. Hair match	
UWA	Antonio Inoki vs. El Canek; April 22, 1979	Naucalpan, Mexico	El Toreo de Cuatro Caminos	24,000	Antonio Inoki (c) vs. El Canek for the NWF Heavyweight Championship	
UWA	El Canek vs. Riki Choshu; July 23, 1982	Mexico City, Mexico	El Palacio de los Deportes	23,000	El Canek (c) vs. Riki Choshu for the UWA World Heavyweight Championship	
EMLL	EMLL 57th Anniversary Show; September 21, 1990	Mexico City, Mexico	Arena Mexico	23,000	Cien Caras vs. Rayo de Jalisco Jr. in a Best 2-out-of-3 Falls Mask vs. Mask match	
AAA	Triplemanía XIII; May 15, 2005	Guadalajara, Mexico	Plaza de Toros	22,129	Latin Lover, La Parka and Octagón vs. Los Hell Brothers (Chessman and Cibernético) and Fuerza Guerrera in a Best 2-out-of-3 Falls "Lucha Libre rules" six-man tag team match	

== Historical ==
Top 5 most-attended shows in the 1930s
No.	Promoter	Event	Location	Venue	Attendance	Main Event(s)
1.	EMLL	Vincent Lopez vs. Man Mountain Dean; October 12, 1935	Mexico City, Mexico	Plaza Mexico	35,000	Vincent Lopez vs. Man Mountain Dean for the World Heavyweight Championship
2.	EMLL	Jim Londos vs. El Enmascarado Rojo; May 12, 1935	Naucalpan, Mexico	El Toreo de la Condesa	20,000	Jim Londos (c) vs. El Enmascarado Rojo in a Mask vs. Title match for the NWA World Heavyweight Championship
3.	EMLL	Jueves Arena México; September 22, 1938	Mexico City, Mexico	La Arena Modelo	14,000	Jack O'Brien vs. Pete Pancoff in a Super Libre match
3.	—	Mildred Burke vs. Lupe Acosta; June 14, 1939	Monterrey, Mexico		14,000	Mildred Burke vs. Lupe Acosta
4.	—	Ed Lewis vs. Jim Browning; April 15, 1934	Naucalpan, Mexico	El Toreo de la Condesa	12,000	Jim Browning (c) vs. Ed "Strangler" Lewis for the NYSAC World Heavyweight Championship
5.	EMLL	EMLL 5th Anniversary Show; September 16, 1938	Mexico City, Mexico	La Arena Modelo	Unknown (Note: The exact attendance figure is unknown, however, the event is described as a "sellout". There are different reports on the capacity of the building with numbers ranging from 5,000 to 10,000.)	Tarzán López (c) vs. Don Hill for the Mexican National Welterweight Championship

Top 10 most-attended shows in the 1940s
No.	Promoter	Event	Location	Venue	Attendance	Main Event(s)
1.	EMLL	EMLL 10th Anniversary Show; September 24, 1943	Mexico City, Mexico	Arena Coliseo	10,000	El Santo vs. Bobby Bonales in a Mask vs. Hair match
1.	EMLL	El Santo vs. Dientes Hernandez; December 29, 1943	Mexico City, Mexico	Arena Mexico	10,000	El Santo vs. Dientes Hernandez in a Super Libre match
2.	EMLL	EMLL 15th Anniversary Show; September 22, 1948	Mexico City, Mexico	Arena Coliseo	9,980	Tarzán López vs. Mike Kelly
3.	EMLL	Domingos Arena Modelo; December 28, 1941	Mexico City, Mexico	Arena Mexico	9,000	El Enmascarado Rojo vs. Bobby Segura
3.	EMLL	Domingos Arena Modelo; July 26, 1942	Mexico City, Mexico	Arena Mexico	9,000	El Santo vs. Ciclón Veloz
3.	EMLL	Domingos Arena Modelo; July 3, 1949	Mexico City, Mexico	Arena Mexico	9,000	El Santo vs. Enrique Llanes in a Mask vs. Hair match
4.	EMLL	Super Viernes; June 11, 1943	Mexico City, Mexico	Arena Coliseo	8,800	El Santo (c) vs. Bobby Bonales for the Mexican National Middleweight Championship
4.	EMLL	Super Viernes; May 31, 1946	Mexico City, Mexico	Arena Coliseo	8,800	La Parejas Atomicos (El Santo and Gori Guerrero) vs. The Truesdales (Jack Truesdale and Tuffy Truesdale)
4.	EMLL	Miércoles de Coliseo; January 1, 1947	Mexico City, Mexico	Arena Coliseo	8,800	The French Angel vs. Nick Curtis
5.	EMLL	Jueves Arena México; July 4, 1940	Mexico City, Mexico	Arena Mexico	8,000	El Murciélago Enmascarado vs. Dientes Hernández in a Mask vs. Hair match
6.	EMLL	El Murciélago Enmascarado vs. Octavio Gaona; July 18, 1940	Mexico City, Mexico	Arena Mexico	Unknown (Note: The exact attendance figure is unknown, however, both events are described as "standing-room only". Thousands of fans were reportedly turned away at the July 18, 1940 show.)	El Murciélago Enmascarado vs. Octavio Gaona in a Hair vs. Mask match
6.	EMLL	Black Shadow & Blue Demon vs. Rito Romero & Juventino Romero; January 2, 1949	Mexico City, Mexico	Arena Mexico	Unknown	Black Shadow and Blue Demon vs. Rito Romero and Juventino Romero
7.	EMLL	Domingos Arena Modelo; January 4, 1942	Mexico City, Mexico	Arena Mexico	Unknown (Note: The exact attendance figure is unknown, however, the event is described as a "sellout".)	El Enmascarado Rojo vs. Bobby Segura in a Súper Libre Mask vs. Hair match
8.	EMLL	Domingos Arena Modelo; January 11, 1942	Mexico City, Mexico	Arena Mexico	Unknown	El Enmascarado Rojo vs. Puma Valderrama in a Mask vs. Hair match
9.	EMLL	Domingos Arena Modelo; February 21, 1943	Mexico City, Mexico	Arena Mexico	Unknown	Ciclon Veloz (c) vs. El Santo for the Mexican National Welterweight Championship
10.	EMLL	Jueves de Coliseo; August 19, 1948	Mexico City, Mexico	Arena Coliseo	Unknown	El Santo vs. Murcielago Velazquez

Top 10 most-attended shows in the 1950s
No.	Promoter	Event	Location	Venue	Attendance	Main Event(s)
1.	TVC	Medico Asesino vs. Gardenia Davis; October 3, 1954	Guadalajara, Mexico	Plaza de Toros el Progreso	48,000	Medico Asesino vs. Gardenia Davis
2.	TVC	Medico Asesino vs. Tonina Jackson; February 28, 1954	Guadalajara, Mexico	Plaza de Toros el Progreso	41,000	Medico Asesino vs. Tonina Jackson in a Mask vs. Hair match
3.	EMLL	Blue Demon vs. El Santo; September 27, 1953	Mexico City, Mexico	Plaza de Toros	28,000	Blue Demon (c) vs. El Santo for the NWA World Welterweight Championship
4.	EMLL	Blue Demon vs. El Santo; July 25, 1953	Mexico City, Mexico	Plaza de Toros	25,000	Blue Demon vs. El Santo in a Best 2-out-of-3 Falls match
4.	EMLL	Blue Demon vs. Tony Borne; November 27, 1953	Mexico City, Mexico	Plaza de Toros	25,000	Blue Demon vs. Tony Borne in a Mask vs. Hair/Beard match
4.	EMLL	Black Shadow vs. Tony Borne; October 30, 1958	Mexico City, Mexico	Plaza de Toros	25,000	Black Shadow vs. Tony Borne in a Hair vs. Hair match
5.	EMLL	Sugi Sito vs. El Santo; January 1, 1954	Mexico City, Mexico	Plaza de Toros	22,000	Sugi Sito (c) vs. El Santo for the NWA World Middleweight Championship
6.	EMLL	El Santo vs. Blue Demon; August 7, 1953	Mexico City, Mexico	Plaza de Toros	21,000	El Santo vs. Blue Demon
7.	EMLL	El Santo vs. Black Shadow; November 7, 1952	Mexico City, Mexico	Plaza de Toros	20,000	El Santo vs. Black Shadow
7.	EMLL	Al Kashey vs. Dory Dixon; February 13, 1959	Mexico City, Mexico	Plaza de Toros	20,000	Al Kashey vs. Dory Dixon for the vacant NWA World Light Heavyweight Championship
8.	EMLL	El Santo vs. El Popeye Soto; October 15, 1954	Mexico City, Mexico	Plaza de Toros	18,000	El Santo vs. El Popeye Soto
9.	EMLL	El Santo & Medico Asesino vs. Blue Demon & Rolando Vera; April 27, 1956	Mexico City, Mexico	Arena Mexico	17,678	El Santo and Medico Asesino vs. Blue Demon and Rolando Vera
9.	EMLL	EMLL 23rd Anniversary Show; September 21, 1956	Mexico City, Mexico	Arena Mexico	17,678	El Santo vs. El Gladiator in a Mask vs. Mask match
10.	EMLL	Mexican National Tag Team Championship Tournament; June 14, 1957	Mexico City, Mexico	Arena Mexico	17,500	8-team tournament for the vacant Mexican National Tag Team Championship

Top 10 most-attended shows in the 1960s
No.	Promoter	Event	Location	Venue	Attendance	Main Event(s)
1.	EMLL	Ray Mendoza vs. Karloff Lagarde; July 2, 1965	Mexico City, Mexico	Arena Mexico	20,000	Ray Mendoza vs. Karloff Lagarde
1.	EMLL	Ray Mendoza vs. Rene Guajardo; August 20, 1965	Mexico City, Mexico	Arena Mexico	20,000	Ray Mendoza vs. Rene Guajardo in a Hair vs. Hair match
1.	EMLL	Super Viernes; December 13, 1968	Mexico City, Mexico	Arena Mexico	20,000	Ray Mendoza vs. El Solitario in a Mask vs. Hair match
2.	EMLL	El Santo vs. Espanto I October 25, 1963	Mexico City, Mexico	Arena Mexico	18,000	El Santo vs. Espanto I in a Mask vs Mask match
3.	EMLL	Black Shadow vs. Rene Guajardo; April 30, 1965	Mexico City, Mexico	Arena Mexico	17,800	Black Shadow vs. Rene Guajardo in a Best 2-out-of-3 Falls Hair vs. Hair match
4.	EMLL	EMLL 33rd Anniversary Show; September 30, 1966	Mexico City, Mexico	Arena Mexico	17,500	Rene Guajardo vs. Jerry London in a Hair vs. Hair match
5.	EMLL	EMLL 32nd Anniversary Show; September 24, 1965	Mexico City, Mexico	Arena Mexico	17,100	Huracán Ramírez (c) vs. Karloff Lagarde in a Best 2-out-of-3 match for the NWA World Welterweight Championship
5.	EMLL	EMLL 36th Anniversary Show; September 25, 1969	Mexico City, Mexico	Arena Mexico	17,100	El Solitario (c) vs. El Santo for the NWA World Middleweight Championship
6.	EMLL	EMLL 28th Anniversary Show; September 22, 1961	Mexico City, Mexico	Arena Mexico	17,000	Rene Guajardo (c) vs. El Santo for the NWA World Middleweight Championship
7.	EMLL	El Santo & Rayo de Jalisco vs. La Ola Blanca; December 30, 1966	Mexico City, Mexico	Arena Mexico	16,000	El Santo and Rayo de Jalisco vs. La Ola Blanca (Angel Blanco and Dr. Wagner) for the Mexican National Tag Team Championship
8.	EMLL	Rey Mendoza vs. Gory Guerrero; July 29, 1960	Mexico City, Mexico	Arena Mexico	15,000	Rey Mendoza vs. Gory Guerrero for the NWA World Light Heavyweight Championship
8.	EMLL	EMLL 35th Anniversary Show; September 20, 1968	Mexico City, Mexico	Arena Mexico	15,000	El Santo and Rey Mendoza vs. La Ola Blanca (Angel Blanco and Dr. Wagner)
9.	EMLL	El Santo, Mil Mascaras & Ray Mendoza vs. Black Shadow, Karloff Lagarde & Rene Guajardo; November 25, 1966	Mexico City, Mexico	Arena Mexico	14,000	El Santo, Mil Mascaras and Ray Mendoza vs. Black Shadow, Karloff Lagarde and Rene Guajardo
10.	EMLL	Black Shadow vs. El Angel Exterminador; August 25, 1967	Mexico City, Mexico	Arena Mexico	13,500	Black Shadow vs. El Angel Exterminador in a Mask vs. Hair match

Top 10 most-attended shows in the 1970s
No.	Promoter	Event	Location	Venue	Attendance	Main Event(s)
1.	UWA	Lou Thesz vs. Mil Mascaras; September 7, 1977	Naucalpan, Mexico	El Toreo de Cuatro Caminos	30,000	Lou Thesz (c) vs. Mil Mascaras for the UWA World Heavyweight Championship
2.	UWA	Lou Thesz vs. Mil Mascaras; August 15, 1977	Mexico City, Mexico	El Palacio de los Deportes	28,000	Lou Thesz (c) vs. Mil Mascaras for the UWA World Heavyweight Championship
3.	UWA	Torneo de la Muerte; May 1, 1975	Mexico City, Mexico	La Plaza de Toros	27,500	Dr. Wagner and El Halcon vs. The Twin Devils (Twin Devil #1 and Twin Devil #2) in a double Mask vs. Mask tournament final
4.	UWA	México contra el Resto del Mundo; December 19, 1979	Mexico City, Mexico	El Palacio de los Deportes	27,000	Tatsumi Fujinami (c) vs. Ángel Blanco for the WWF Junior Heavyweight Championship
5.	UWA	El Solitario vs. Tatsumi Fujinami; May 22, 1977	Mexico City, Mexico	El Palacio de los Deportes	25,000	El Solitario (c) vs. Tatsumi Fujinami for the UWA World Light Heavyweight Championship
6.	UWA	Bobby Lee and Villano III vs. Los Escorpiones; August 13, 1978	Mexico City, Mexico	El Palacio de los Deportes	24,000	Bobby Lee and Villano III vs. Los Escorpiones (Escorpión #1 and Escorpión #2) in a Mask vs. Mask/Hair match
6.	UWA	Bobby Lee vs. El Santo; September 24, 1978	Mexico City, Mexico	El Palacio de los Deportes	24,000	Bobby Lee vs. El Santo in a Mask vs. Hair match
6.	UWA	Antonio Inoki vs. El Canek; April 22, 1979	Naucalpan, Mexico	El Toreo de Cuatro Caminos	24,000	Antonio Inoki (c) vs. El Canek for the NWF Heavyweight Championship
7.	UWA	Ray Mendoza vs. Angel Blanco; July 6, 1975	Mexico City, Mexico	La Plaza de Toros	22,000	Ray Mendoza vs. Angel Blanco in a Hair vs. Hair match
7.	UWA	Bobby Lee vs. El Santo; September 3, 1978	Mexico City, Mexico	El Palacio de los Deportes	22,000	Bobby Lee vs. El Santo in a Mask vs. Mask match
7.	UWA	UWA Battle Royal; September 16, 1979	Mexico City, Mexico	El Palacio de los Deportes	22,000	24-man Battle Royal
8.	UWA	Bobby Lee vs. El Santo; August 27, 1978	Mexico City, Mexico	El Palacio de los Deportes	21,450	Bobby Lee (c) vs. El Santo for the UWA World Welterweight Championship
9.	UWA	UWA Debut Show; January 29, 1975	Mexico City, Mexico	El Palacio de los Deportes	21,000	Anibal (c) vs. Rene Guajardo for the NWA World Middleweight Championship
9.	UWA	El Solitario vs. Tatsumi Fujinami; May 23, 1977	Mexico City, Mexico	El Palacio de los Deportes	21,000	El Solitario (c) vs. Tatsumi Fujinami for the UWA World Light Heavyweight Championship
10.	EMLL	El Solitario vs. Angel Blanco; December 8, 1972	Mexico City, Mexico	Arena México	20,000	El Solitario vs. Angel Blanco in a Mask vs. Mask match
10.	EMLL	EMLL 42nd Anniversary Show (3); October 3, 1975	Mexico City, Mexico	Arena México	20,000	El Santo vs. Perro Aguayo in a Mask vs. Hair match
10.	UWA	Mil Mascaras & El Solitario vs. Angel Blanco & Rene Guajardo; October 30, 1977	Naucalpan, Mexico	El Toreo de Cuatro Caminos	20,000	Mil Mascaras and El Solitario vs. Angel Blanco and Rene Guajardo
10.	UWA	UWA 4th Anniversary Show; January 28, 1979	Naucalpan, Mexico	El Toreo de Cuatro Caminos	20,000	Dr. Wagner vs. Ángel Blanco in a Mask vs. Hair match

Top 10 most-attended shows in the 1980s
No.	Promoter	Event	Location	Venue	Attendance	Main Event(s)
1.	UWA	Tatsumi Fujinami vs. El Canek; June 12, 1983	Naucalpan, Mexico	El Toreo de Cuatro Caminos	30,000	Tatsumi Fujinami (c) vs. El Canek for the UWA World Heavyweight Championship
2.	UWA	Colosal Torneo de la Muerte; August 22, 1982	Mexico City, Mexico	Palacio de los Deportes	28,000	Los Brazos (Oro and Plata) vs. El Enfermero #2 and Flama Azul in a double Mask vs. Mask tournament final
2.	UWA	El Canek vs. Dos Caras; October 4, 1983	Naucalpan, Mexico	El Toreo de Cuatro Caminos	28,000	El Canek (c) vs. Dos Caras for the UWA World Heavyweight Championship
3.	UWA	El Santo Retirement Show; September 12, 1982	Naucalpan, Mexico	El Toreo de Cuatro Caminos	25,500	El Santo, Gori Guerrero, Huracán Ramírez and El Solitario vs. Perro Aguayo, El Signo, El Texano and Negro Navarro
4.	UWA	El Canek vs. Tatsumi Fujinami; May 1, 1983	Naucalpan, Mexico	El Toreo de Cuatro Caminos	25,000	El Canek (c) vs. Tatsumi Fujinami for the UWA World Heavyweight Championship
4.	UWA	UWA 9th Anniversary Show; February 12, 1984	Naucalpan, Mexico	El Toreo de Cuatro Caminos	25,000	El Canek (c) vs. André the Giant for the UWA World Heavyweight Championship
5.	UWA	El Canek vs. Riki Choshu; July 23, 1982	Mexico City, Mexico	El Palacio de los Deportes	23,000	El Canek (c) vs. Riki Choshu for the UWA World Heavyweight Championship
6.	UWA	Perro Aguayo vs. Rene Guajardo; June 29, 1980	Mexico City, Mexico	El Palacio de los Deportes	22,000	Perro Aguayo vs. Rene Guajardo in a Hair vs. Hair match
6.	UWA	Ultraman vs. Shazam; July 13, 1980	Mexico City, Mexico	El Palacio de los Deportes	22,000	Ultraman vs. Shazam in a Mask vs. Mask match
6.	UWA	Los Tres Caballeros vs. Los Misioneros de la Muerte; April 3, 1983	Naucalpan, Mexico	El Toreo de Cuatro Caminos	22,000	Los Tres Caballeros (El Solitario, Anibal and Villano III) vs. Los Misioneros de la Muerte (El Signo, El Texano and Negro Navarro)
7.	UWA	Rayo de Jalisco Jr. vs. Super Halcon; April 23, 1989	Mexico City, Mexico	El Palacio de los Deportes	21,000	Rayo de Jalisco Jr. vs. Super Halcon in a Mask vs. Mask match
8.	UWA	Antonio Inoki vs. Bob Backlund; May 1, 1982	Naucalpan, Mexico	El Toreo de Cuatro Caminos	20,000	Antonio Inoki (c-NJPW) vs. Bob Backlund (c-WWWF) in a Champion vs. Champion match for the NWF World Heavyweight Championship and WWWF World Heavyweight Championship with special referee Lou Thesz
8.	EMLL / UWA	Domingos Arena México; September 5, 1982	Mexico City, Mexico	Arena México	20,000	8-team Ruleta de la Muerte tournament
9.	UWA	André the Giant & El Solitario vs. Aníbal, El Canek & Dr. Wagner; September 7, 1980	Mexico City, Mexico	El Palacio de los Deportes	19,000	André the Giant and El Solitario vs. Aníbal, El Canek and Dr. Wagner in a 3-on-2 Handicap match
9.	UWA	UWA 7th Anniversary Show; February 14, 1982	Naucalpan, Mexico	El Toreo de Cuatro Caminos	19,000	Antonio Inoki and Tatsumi Fujinami vs. Perro Aguayo and Abdullah the Butcher
9.	UWA	Rey Mendoza & Carlos Colon vs. Perro Aguayo & Abdullah the Butcher; August 15, 1982	Naucalpan, Mexico	El Toreo de Cuatro Caminos	19,000	Rey Mendoza and Carlos Colon vs. Perro Aguayo and Abdullah the Butcher
10.	UWA	El Asesino vs. Babe Face; July 19, 1981	Mexico City, Mexico	El Palacio de los Deportes	18,500	El Asesino vs. Babe Face in a Hair vs. Hair match
10.	EMLL	Super Viernes; June 24, 1983	Mexico City, Mexico	Arena México	18,500	Espectro Jr. vs. Sangre Chicana in a Super Libre match

Top 10 most-attended shows in the 1990s
No.	Promoter	Event	Location	Venue	Attendance	Main Event(s)
1.	AAA	TripleManía; April 30, 1993	Mexico City, Mexico	Plaza de Toros	48,000	Cien Caras vs. Konnan in a Best 2-out-of-3 Falls Retirement match
2.	AAA	AAA in Queretoro; May 28, 1993	Santiago de Querétaro, Mexico	La Arena Querétaro	30,000	Heavy Metal (c) vs. El Hijo del Santo for the Mexican National Welterweight Championship
3.	EMLL	EMLL 57th Anniversary Show; September 21, 1990	Mexico City, Mexico	Arena Mexico	23,000	Cien Caras vs. Rayo de Jalisco Jr. in a Best 2-out-of-3 Falls Mask vs. Mask match
4.	AAA	AAA Sin Limite; July 18, 1993	Tonala, Mexico	Río Nilo Coliseum	22,000	Blue Panther vs. Love Machine in a Mask vs. Hair match
5.	CMLL	Ruleta de la Muerte; July 18, 1998	Mexico City, Mexico	El Palicio del Desportes	21,000	El Hijo del Santo vs. Guerrero del Futuro in a Hair vs. Hair match
6.	AAA	AAA Sin Limite; June 18, 1993	Tonala, Mexico		20,000	El Hijo del Santo, Octagón and Perro Aguayo vs. Fuerza Guerrera, Máscara Año Dos Mil and El Satánico
6.	AAA	AAA Sin Limite; August 13, 1993	Tonala, Mexico	Río Nilo Coliseum	20,000	Cien Caras vs. MS-1 in a Hair vs. Hair match
6.	AAA	AAA Sin Limite; January 9, 1994	Tonala, Mexico	Río Nilo Coliseum	20,000	Konnan, Octagón, Latin Lover & Heavy Metal vs. Cien Caras, La Parka, Blue Panther and Fuerza Guerrera
6.	AAA	AAA in Pozu Rica; February 25, 1994	Pozu Rica, Mexico	Pozu Rica Baseball Stadium	20,000	Heavy Metal and Latin Lover vs. Los Gringos Locos (Art Barr and Eddy Guerrero) in a tournament final
6.	AAA	AAA in Toluca; March 19, 1994	Toluca, Mexico	Toluca Baseball Stadium	20,000	Konnan, Perro Aguayo and Heavy Metal vs. Los Hermanos Dinamitas (Cien Caras, Universo 2000 and Mascara Ano 2000)
7.	UWA	El Canek vs. Kokina Maximus; March 3, 1991	Naucalpan, Mexico	El Toreo de Cuatro Caminos	19,500	El Canek (c) vs. Kokina Maximus for the UWA World Heavyweight Championship
7.	AAA	Triplemanía III-B; June 18, 1995	Tonala, Mexico	Río Nilo Coliseum	19,500	Marabunta vs. Winners in a Mask vs. Mask match
8.	CMLL / UWA	Perro Aguayo vs. Konnan; March 22, 1991	Guadalajara, Mexico	Plaza de Toros Monumental	19,000	Dos Caras, Mil Máscaras, Rayo de Jalisco Sr. and Rayo de Jalisco Jr. vs. Bestia Salvaje, Killer, Satánico and Villano III
9.	EMLL	EMLL 58th Anniversary Show; September 8, 1991	Mexico City, Mexico	Arena México	18,500	Konnan vs. Perro Aguayo in a Hair vs. Hair match
9.	AAA	Verano de Escándalo; September 14, 1997	Tonalá, Mexico	Río Nilo Coliseum	18,500	El Cobarde #2 vs. Heavy Metal vs. Perro Aguayo vs. Perro Aguayo Jr. vs. El Picudo vs. Sangre Chicana in a Domo de la Muerte match
9.	CMLL	CMLL 64th Anniversary Show; September 19, 1997	Mexico City, Mexico	Arena México	18,500	El Hijo del Santo vs. Negro Casas in a Mask vs. Hair match
10.	AAA	Torneo de los Tres Ases; April 30, 1995	Tonala, Mexico	Río Nilo Coliseum	18,200	Cien Caras vs. Konnan vs. Perro Aguayo in a Triangle match for the Rio Nilo Cup

Top 10 most-attended shows in the 2000s
No.	Promoter	Event	Location	Venue	Attendance	Main Event(s)
1.	AAA / CMLL	AAA vs. CMLL; June 17, 2000	Mexico City, Mexico	Plaza de Toros	25,000	Rayo de Jalisco Jr., Brazo de Plata, Octagón and La Parka Jr. vs. Shocker, Pierroth Jr., Cibernetico and Abismo Negro
2.	AAA	Triplemanía XIII; May 15, 2005	Guadalajara, Mexico	Plaza de Toros	22,129	Latin Lover, La Parka and Octagón vs. Los Hell Brothers (Chessman and Cibernético) and Fuerza Guerrera in a Best 2-out-of-3 falls six-man "Lucha Libre rules" tag team match
3.	CMLL	Super Viernes; March 17, 2000	Mexico City, Mexico	Arena México	20,000	Atlantis vs. Villano III in a Mask vs. Mask match
3.	AAA?	Joe Líder, Konnan & Nicho el Millonario vs. Gronda#2, La Parka Jr. & Octagón; December 13, 2008	Tepic, Mexico	El Parque Ecológico	20,000	Joe Líder, Konnan and Nicho el Millonario vs. Gronda #2, La Parka Jr. and Octagón
3.	WWE	WWE Raw; May 30, 2009	Mexico City, Mexico	El Palacio de los Deportes	20,000	Randy Orton (c) vs. Rey Mysterio for the WWE Championship
3.	AAA	AAA on Televisa; July 26, 2009	Mexico City, Mexico	El Centro Banamex	20,000	Cibernético vs. Dr. Wagner Jr. in a number one contender match for the AAA World Heavyweight Championship
3.	WWE	WWE SmackDown & ECW; October 17, 2009	Mexico City, Mexico	El Palacio de los Deportes	20,000	Batista, Rey Mysterio and The Undertaker vs. CM Punk, Chris Jericho and Kane
4.	WWE	WWE SmackDown; January 19, 2006	Mexico City, Mexico	El Palacio de los Deportes	19,726	The Undertaker vs. Randy Orton
5.	WWE	WWE RAW; September 20, 2006	Mexico City, Mexico	El Palacio de los Deportes	19,417	John Cena (c) vs. Edge in a Street Fight match for the WWE Championship
6.	AAA	TripleMania XV; July 15, 2007	Naucalpan, Mexico	El Toreo de Cuatro Caminos	19,000	Los Hell Brothers (Charly Manson, Chessman, and Cibernético) defeated La Legión Extranjera (El Mesías, Sean Waltman and Kenzo Suzuki) in a Domo de la Muerte cage match
6.	AAA	TripleMania XVI; July 13, 2008	Mexico City, Mexico	El Palacio de los Deportes	19,000	Cibernético (c) vs. El Zorro for the AAA Mega Championship
6.	CMLL	Homenaje a Dos Leyendas; March 20, 2009	Mexico City, Mexico	Arena México	19,000	Último Guerrero vs. Villano V in a Mask vs. Mask match
7.	AAA	Triplemanía XII; June 20, 2004	Naucalpan, Mexico	El Toreo de Cuatro Caminos	18,988	Cibernético vs. La Parka Jr. in a Mask vs. Mask match
8.	CMLL	Super Viernes: Infierno en el Ring; June 17, 2005	Mexico City, Mexico	Arena México	18,900	Damián 666, Halloween, Heavy Metal, Héctor Garza, Máscara Mágica, Místico, Negro Casas, Perro Aguayo Jr. and Universo Dos Mil in a Domo de la Muerte match
9.	AAA	Guerra de Titanes; December 5, 2004	Naucalpan, Mexico	El Toreo de Cuatro Caminos	18,500	Cibernético and La Parka vs. La Legión Extranjera (Konnan and Rikishi)
9.	CMLL	CMLL 72nd Anniversary Show; September 16, 2005	Mexico City, Mexico	Arena México	18,500	Héctor Garza vs. Perro Aguayo Jr. vs. Universo 2000 in a Hair vs. Hair match
9.	CMLL	Super Viernes: 25 Años de Atlantis; July 11, 2008	Mexico City, Mexico	Arena México	18,500	Atlantis vs. Blue Panther
9.	CMLL	Leyenda de Plata; July 25, 2008	Mexico City, Mexico	Arena México	18,500	Místico vs. Perro Aguayo Jr. in the Leyenda de Plata tournament final
10.	CMLL	Super Viernes; August 4, 2006	Mexico City, Mexico	Arena México	18,280	El Hijo del Santo, Místico, Negro Casas vs. Atlantis, Ultimo Guerrero and Black Warrior

Top 10 most-attended shows in the 2010s
No.	Promoter	Event	Location	Venue	Attendance	Main Event(s)
1.	AAA	Lucha Libre Internacional; March 27, 2012	Tepic, Mexico	El Palenque de la Feria	30,000	El Mesías, Chris Masters and Shelton Benjamin vs. Carlito Caribbean Cool, La Parka Jr. and Luke Gallows
2.	AAA	Triplemanía XXII; August 17, 2014	Mexico City, Mexico	Arena Ciudad de México	21,000	Cibernético vs. Dr. Wagner Jr. vs. El Hijo del Perro Aguayo vs. Myzteziz in a four-way elimination match
3.	WWE	WWE Raw; May 8, 2010	Mexico City, Mexico	El Palacio de los Deportes	20,000	John Cena, Randy Orton and Big Show vs. The Miz, Batista and Sheamus
3.	CMLL	El Hijo del Fantasma, La Máscara & Místico vs. El Olímpico, El Averno & El Mephisto; January 6, 2011	Boca del Río, Mexico	El Parque de Béisbol 'Beto Ávila'	20,000	El Hijo del Fantasma, La Máscara and Místico vs. El Olímpico, El Averno and El Mephisto
4.	WWE	WWE Raw; May 13, 2011	Mexico City, Mexico	El Palacio de los Deportes	19,900	John Cena (c) vs. The Miz for the WWE Championship
5.	AAA	Triplemanía XXI; June 6, 2013	Mexico City, Mexico	Arena Ciudad de México	19,500	Cibernético vs. El Hijo del Perro Aguayo in a Hair vs. Hair match
6.	AAA	Triplemanía XX; August 5, 2012	Mexico City, Mexico	Arena Ciudad de México	19,000	Dr. Wagner Jr. vs. Máscara Año Dos Mil Jr. for the Mask vs. Mask match
7.	CMLL	Homenaje a Dos Leyendas; March 19, 2010	Mexico City, Mexico	Arena México	18,500	La Sombra vs. El Felino in a Mask vs. Mask match
7.	CMLL	CMLL 80th Anniversary Show; September 13, 2013	Mexico City, Mexico	Arena México	18,500	La Sombra vs. Volador Jr. in a Mask vs. Mask match
8.	CMLL	Super Viernes; September 17, 2010	Mexico City, Mexico	Arena México	18,000	Místico vs. Volador Jr. in a Torneo Bicentenario tournament final
8.	AAA	Triplemanía XXI; June 16, 2013	Mexico City, Mexico	Arena Ciudad de México	18,000	Cibernético vs. Perro Aguayo Jr. in a Hair vs. Hair match
9.	AAA	TripleMania XIX; August 3, 2019	Mexico City, Mexico	El Palacio de los Deportes	17,900	Dr. Wagner Jr. vs. Rob Van Dam for the inaugural AAA Latin American Championship
10.	CMLL	Sin Salida; June 6, 2010	Mexico City, Mexico	Arena México	17,500	Máximo vs. Taichi Ishikari in a Hair vs. Hair match
10.	CMLL	Infierno en el Ring; July 18, 2010	Mexico City, Mexico	Arena México	17,500	Ángel Azteca Jr. vs. Ángel de Oro vs. Ángel de Plata vs. Diamante vs. Dr. X vs. Fabián el Gitano vs. Hooligan vs. Hysteria Extreme vs. Monsther vs. Puma King vs. Sensei vs. Tiger Kid in a 12-man Domo de la Muerte match
10.	CMLL	CMLL 77th Anniversary Show; September 3, 2010	Mexico City, Mexico	Arena México	17,500	Atlantis vs. El Averno vs. Ephesto vs. Gran Alebrije vs. Hysteria Extreme vs. Jushin Thunder Liger vs. El Mephisto vs. Místico vs. Mr. Niebla vs. El Olímpico vs. Psycosis Extreme vs. La Sombra vs. Último Guerrero vs. Volador Jr. in a 14-man Domo de la Muerte match
10.	CMLL	CMLL 81st Anniversary Show; September 19, 2014	Mexico City, Mexico	Arena México	17,500	Atlantis vs. Último Guerrero in a Mask vs. Mask match
10.	AAA	Triplemanía XXIII; August 9, 2015	Mexico City, Mexico	Arena Ciudad de México	17,500	Rey Mysterio Jr. vs. Myzteziz
