= Toreo Parque Central =

Mixed-use development in Naucalpan, Mexico

Coordinates: 19.4547225°N 99.2191233°W

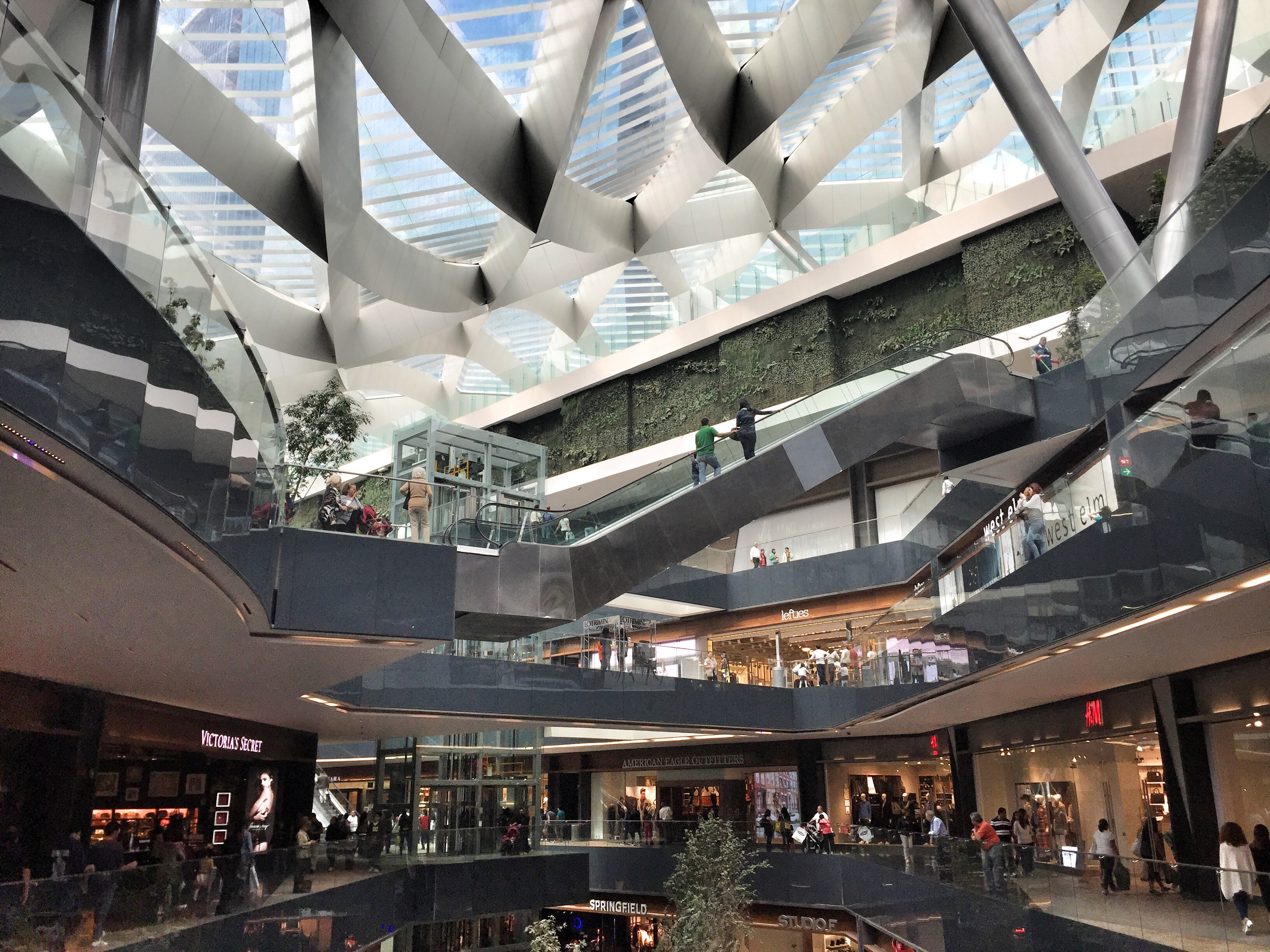
Interior of Plaza Toreo

Toreo Parque Central (literally, "Central Park Bullring") is a mixed-use development in Naucalpan, State of Mexico, Greater Mexico City. It has an enclosed shopping center named Plaza Toreo and it was built on the site of the former bullring Toreo de Cuatro Caminos. It is located immediately adjacent to the city limits of Mexico City on the east side of the Periférico freeway Lomas de Sotelo neighborhood of Naucalpan municipality, in the State of Mexico. It is thus located between Antara Polanco luxury mall, 3 km to its south and Plaza Satélite, 7 km to its north.

The mall had a soft opening in November 2014, and President Enrique Peña Nieto attended its official grand opening in June 2015. The mall is part of a larger, 473,000-square-metre (5,090,000 sq ft) complex developed by Grupo Danhos that also includes three office towers and a hotel.

With the October 2017 addition of a 20,000-square-metre (220,000 sq ft) Liverpool department store, the mall boasts 90,000 square metres (970,000 sq ft) of gross leasable area, making it is one of the largest in the metro area Other anchors include a Selecto Chedraui hypermarket, Sanborns restaurant/junior department store, H&M, and a Cinépolis multicinema.
