= Ricardo Bell (clown) =

English clown, renowned in Mexico

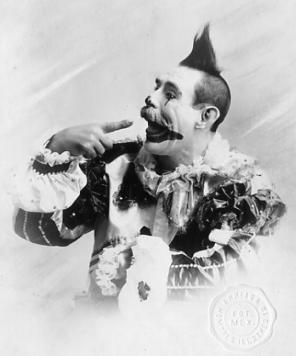
- Promotional card of Bell, unknown date.
- Born: Richard Bell Guest; January 10, 1858; London
- Died: March 12, 1911; New York
- Years active: 1860–1911
- Children: 13

Ricardo Bell was the artistic name of Richard Bell Guest (London, January 10, 1858 – New York, March 12, 1911) an English clown and entrepreneur, famous in Mexico in the late 19th and early 20th centuries. After he became famous as the main actor of Circo Orrín, one of the famous circuses of Mexico City and by becoming the most successful clown in the country, Bell founded his own Gran Circo Ricardo Bell. The poet Juan de Dios Peza wrote in El Monitor Republicano newspaper about Bell that he "is more popular than pulque", in an epoch were the pulque was the preferred alcoholic beverage in Mexico.

== Biography ==
He made his debut in Lyon at the age of two, and then traveled with his family to many cities in Europe. He made his debut in Mexico on October 17, 1869, at Cirque Chiarin. He met his wife Francisca Peyrés in Santiago de Chile, of which they moved to the capital of Mexico contracted Bell by Circo Orrín. In that country only foreign artists appeared in the circuses.

He returned to Mexico in 1881. Due to his talent he quickly triumphed becoming the main attraction in the circus of the Orrín brothers, becoming his partner. Bell was an English clown, who changed the usual aesthetic of the white clown known in Mexico by a more striking one based on the pierrot model, which in Mexico was called "huacaro".

In 1906, Bell had granted by the Porfirio Díaz government the lands of the former Hospice of the Poor on Avenida Juárez, in front of the Alameda Central. In this space Bell installed the Gran Circo Ricardo Bell, where his thirteen children acted. The chronicles and newspaper reports of the epoque detailed the success and connection of Bell with his captive audience.

On January 3, 1911, he travelled with his family to his native London, but they need to make stopover in New York. There he had to stay because of the death of his brother Jerry. In that city he received news of how his house had been taken by rebels of the Mexican Revolution. He died one year after, March 12, 1911, and was buried in that city.

In the city of Mineral del Monte, Hidalgo, exists in the British Cemetery, a tomb of a miner homonymous to the English clown, reason why people of the locality and local legends believes that is the artist who was buried in that site, which is not true.
