= Toreo de Cuatro Caminos =

Former bullring in Naucalpan de Juárez, demolished in 2008

Coordinates: 19.4547225°N 99.2191233°W

Toreo de Cuatro Caminos Cuatro Caminos Bullring
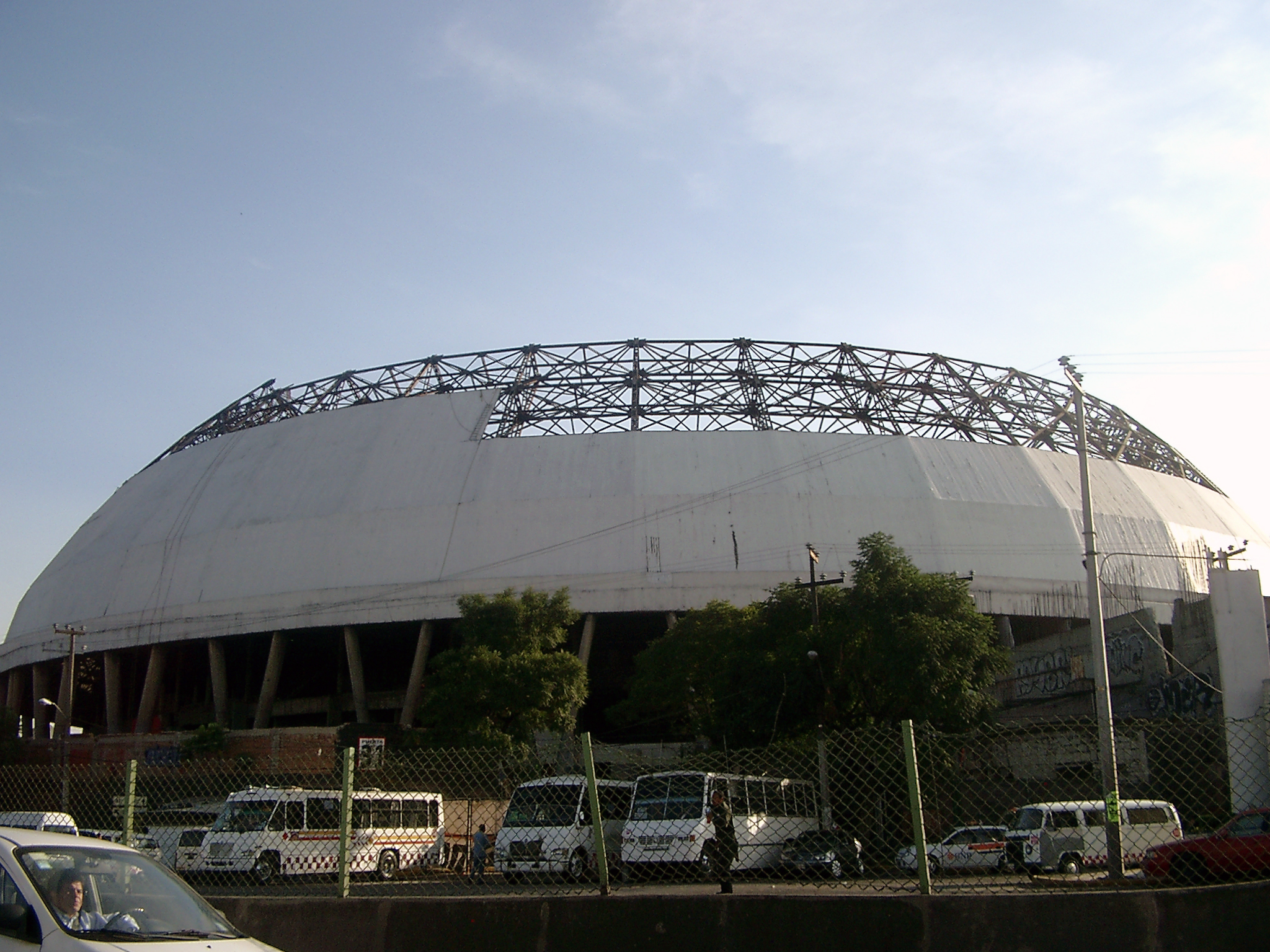
- Toreo de Cuatro Caminos being dismantled, 2008.
- Interactive map of the Toreo de Cuatro Caminos; Cuatro Caminos Bullring area
- Alternative names: Toreo; El Toreo (The Bullring); El Coloso de Naucalpan (The Colossus of Naucalpan)

General information
- Type: Bullring
- Location: Naucalpan de Juárez, State of Mexico, Mexico
- Completed: 1907; 119 years ago (Toreo de la Condesa); 1947; 79 years ago (Cuatro Caminos)
- Inaugurated: 1908; 118 years ago 1948; 78 years ago
- Renovated: 1968; 58 years ago
- Demolished: 2008; 18 years ago
- Owner: Bernal Family (1947-2008); Dhanos Inmobiliary (2008)

Dimensions
- Diameter: 25,000 m (82,000 ft)

Other information
- Seating capacity: 25,000 - 30,000

The Toreo de Cuatro Caminos (literally: Four Roads Bullring; also nicknamed El Coloso de Naucalpan) was a bullring that existed in the limits of Miguel Hidalgo, Mexico City and the municipality of Naucalpan de Juárez, State of Mexico, being an important point of reference on the limits between these two entities for motorists of the Anillo Periférico, a highway adjacent to the site. Since 2008, the Toreo Parque Central shopping center has been located on its site. Even after its demolition, the area where the bullring stood is commonly known as Toreo or Toreo de Cuatro Caminos.
