= Plaza de toros El Progreso =

Bullring in Guadalajara, Mexico

- Interactive map of Plaza de toros El Progreso
- Address: Hospicio and Cabañas streets (currently, Paseo de los Monosabios)
- Location: Guadalajara, Jalisco
- Coordinates: 20°40′36″N 103°20′19″W
- Owner: Ignacio García Aceves (last one)
- Capacity: 14,000
- Surface: beige sand

Construction
- Opened: 1856
- Demolished: January 1979

The Plaza de toros El Progreso was a bullring in the Mexican city of Guadalajara, Jalisco. It was used for bullfighting and also for hosting musical events. The venue could hold 14,000 people and was built in 1856.

== History ==
This venue was inaugurated in 1856, with a bullfight starring matador Lizo Zamora, who charged 50 pesos for fighting five bulls from haciendas near the capital city of Jalisco, when some streets of Guadalajara were cobbled, like the ones near this bullring, and others were simply dirt roads, generally in the suburbs.

Bullfighters such as Rodolfo Gaona The Caliph of León, Juan Silveti, Luis Castro "el Soldado", Carmelo Pérez, Pepe Ortiz Puga, Manuel Martínez Ancira, as well as the novillero Fermín Espinosa "Armillita", fought bulls on the sand of this bullring.

In addition to bullfighting, the bullring was the scene of aerostatic elevations by Abraham Dávalos, Tranquilino Alemán and others, who, hanging from a trapeze, thrilled the public with their acrobatics; presentations of the English clown Ricardo Bell, who with his performances caused the hilarity of the crowd; concerts by musical groups transported in the Caravana Corona (sponsored by the beer bearing that trademark), in the 1960s, led by singer-songwriter and guitarist from El Salto, Mike Laure; and presentations of the Hermanos Martínez Gil.

=== Last bullfight ===
After decades of being the scene of memorable bullfights and other shows, the bullfighting arena in the traditional San Juan de Dios neighborhood had to offer the last bullfight, held on Monday, 1 January 1979, featuring only two of the three programmed and announced bullfighters, in what became a one-on-one between Manolo Arruza and Miguel Espinosa "Armillita", since who was going to be the second bullfighter, David Silveti, became ill. The six bulls that were fought that Monday afternoon were three from a Valle de Guadalupe, Jalisco, fighting-bull ranch named San Mateo (third, fifth, and sixth, as per the order of their appearance), and three from a Zacatecan fighting-bull ranch named Valparaíso (first, second, and fourth). The "Farewell" walking around the bullring was carried out by the two matadors, their subordinates, the businessman Ignacio García Aceves, VIPs, picturesque characters, and an endless number of gatecrashers, while the public, which packed the venue, sang Las golondrinas, composed by Mexican physician and songwriter Narciso Serradell Sevilla.

=== Demolition ===
Days after the final bullfight, and after more than 122 years of functioning as a bullfighting venue, the authorities of the State of Jalisco commissioned architect Ignacio Díaz Morales to demolish the bullring and many buildings and houses in downtown Guadalajara, in an area of 8.648 acres or 376,737 square feet (35,000 square meters), to make way for the construction of Plaza Tapatía, which was inaugurated on 5 February 1982 by the then President of Mexico, José López Portillo, and the then Governor of Jalisco, Flavio Romero de Velasco.

== Description ==
This venue was a first-class bullring, although at the beginning –1856– the maximum capacity was 3,000 spectators, later it had several extensions, until it had a capacity for 14,000 seated fans.
