= Linda Vera =

- Also known as: "La Reina de la Cumbia" (The Queen of Cumbia)
- Born: Martha Muñiz Caloca; 28 January 1932; Mexico City, Mexico
- Died: 5 December 2024 (aged 92) Guadalajara, Jalisco, Mexico
- Genres: Cumbia, bolero, salsa
- Occupation(s): Singer, actress
- Instrument: Vocals
- Years active: 1964–1981
- Labels: CBS; HIT (Continental)
- Formerly of: Carmen Rivero y su Conjunto

Martha Muñiz Caloca (28 January 1932 – 5 December 2024), known professionally as Linda Vera, was a Mexican singer and actress. Nicknamed "La Reina de la Cumbia" (The Queen of Cumbia), she achieved international success as the vocalist of Carmen Rivero's cumbia conjunto and later as a soloist with her own musical group, recording a series of studio albums for the CBS and Continental record labels.

== Biography ==
Vera was born in Tacuba, Mexico City, and earned a degree as a decorator. She began her musical career as the lead vocalist of Mario Patrón's conjunto, the first jazz band in Mexico. Felipe Valdés Leal, a songwriter and the musical director of Mexico's CBS Records, invited her to record tropical music with Carmen Rivero's group; Vera provided the vocals for Rivero's version of "La pollera colorá", which became a major hit. Rivero and Vera also had hits with their versions of "Cartagenera", "El pescador", "Navidad negra", and "Cumbia que te vas de ronda".

Vera eventually left Rivero's group because she wanted to gain recognition as a soloist. She continued her career as a performer and CBS recording artist and also appeared in several Mexican films. After a brief hiatus from 1974 to 1977 (due to her marriage), Vera also ventured into other musical genres, such as salsa and ranchera.

Vera died in Guadalajara, Jalisco, on 5 December 2024.

== Discography ==
- A bailar la cumbia (CBS, 1964) (as the vocalist of Carmen Rivero's conjunto)
- La nueva voz tropical (CBS, 1965)
- Homenaje a Rafael Hernández (1966)
- Ritmo y sentimiento (CBS, 1967)
- Yo me llamo cumbia (CBS, 1968)

== Filmography ==
- El asesino invisible (1965)
- Mi padrino (1969)
