= Waverley Market =

Shopping mall in Edinburgh, Scotland

Coordinates: 55°57′10″N 3°11′30″W

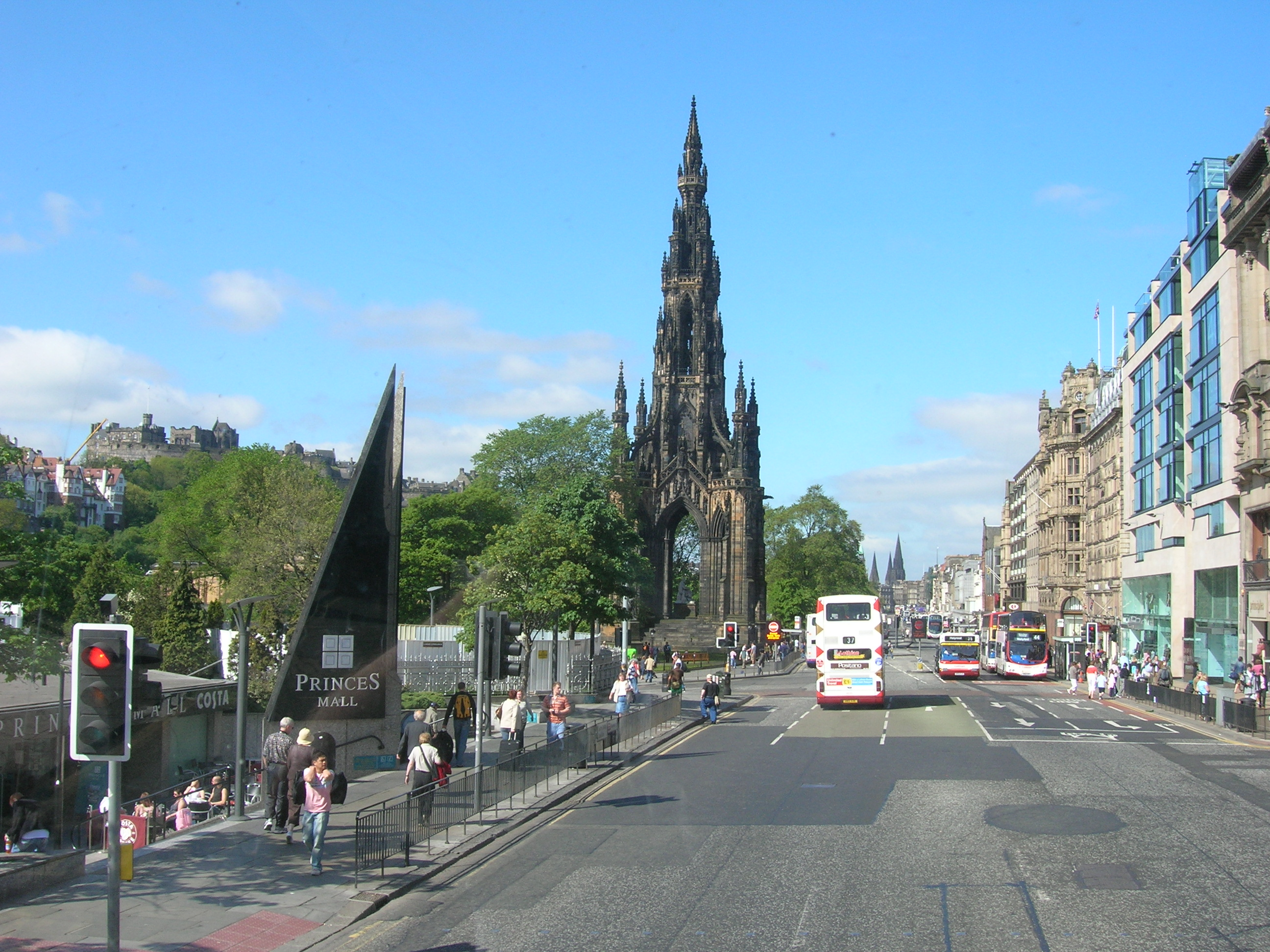
Princes Mall, bottom left, in 2006

Waverley Market (formerly also known as Waverley Shopping Centre, Princes Mall, and Waverley Mall) is a shopping centre in Edinburgh, Scotland.

== The old Waverley Market ==
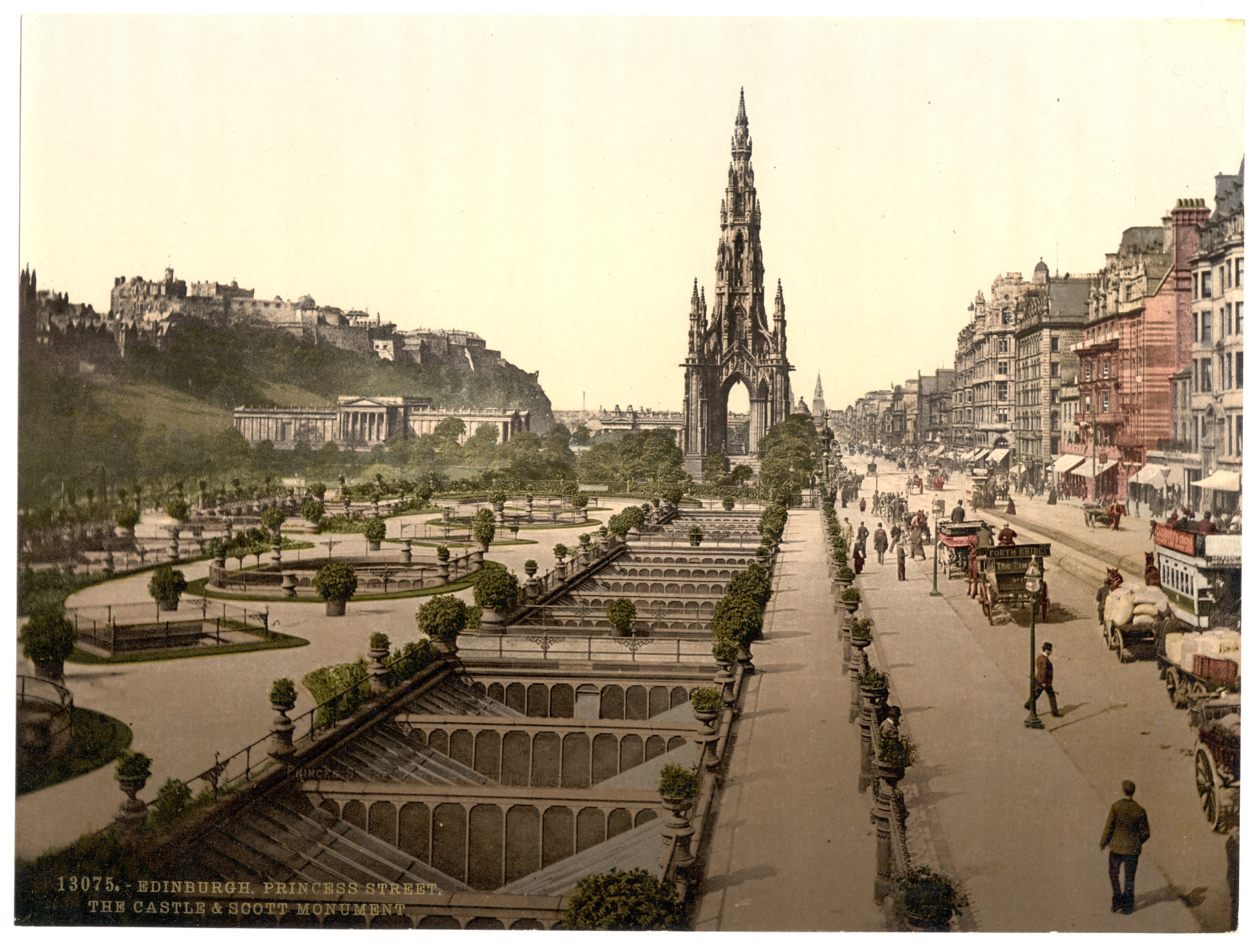
Waverley market roof (left)

The old Waverley Market occupied the same site as the current shopping centre. The location is in the city centre, on a plot bordered by Waverley Bridge, Princes Street, the Balmoral Hotel and Edinburgh Waverley railway station.

Before construction of the railways in Edinburgh, a fruit and vegetable market was located under North Bridge. When the present Waverley station was constructed, this fruit and vegetable market was moved to what is now Waverley Market in 1869. By then the market primarily traded in fruit, vegetables and flowers.

The market was roofed in 1874 by Hanna, Donald & Wilson. The iron and steel roof was built up till street level. It hosted a roof garden, and was very suitable to all kinds of entertainment. In the 1950s most of the vegetable traders moved to warehouses in Market Street. The lower level of Waverley Market then came in heavy use for fairs, circuses, menageries, exhibitions, etc. By the early 1970s, however, the roof garden was no longer maintained. The market was closed on 26 November 1972. In 1973 Waverley Market and its roof were demolished.

== Shopping centre ==
The shopping centre succeeded the previous market building. It is home to a mixture of independent retailers and high street chain stores, as well as a large food court.

Designed in the early 1980s, the shopping centre was built with its roof at the street level of Princes Street, with a landscaped plaza at that level, in order to preserve the view from Princes Street across to Edinburgh Castle and the Old Town. It opened as Waverley Market in November 1984, the name referencing the food market that once occupied the site. An official opening by Queen Elizabeth II took place on 25 July 1985.

In the centre's early years the atria were adorned by luxuriant planting and water features, with shoppers descending on escalators from Princes Street through a canopy of trees to the underground plaza.

Major refurbishment in the early 1990s coincided with a change of name to Waverley Shopping Centre. A prominent and popular aspect of the mall introduced at this time was the large water feature which dominated the main atrium and incorporated the 11 ft high Herons Dream sculpture. This was removed during refurbishment in the early 2000s when the centre adopted the name 'Princes Mall'.

The mall suffered a decline in popularity in the early 2000s with 12 of the retail units empty at one stage. Major new lettings to fashion retailers may indicate the reversal of this decline, helped by the improvements carried out by Network Rail to the Waverley Steps access to Waverley Station by the installation of new stairs and escalators, with a glazed roof, and lifts.

In March 2016, following a £4 million renovation, the shopping centre, was officially reopened, rebranded 'Waverley Mall'.

The shopping centre is currently owned by Tradehold, and it reverted to its original name, Waverley Market in September 2021. Edinburgh City Council has given approval for a further redevelopment, which will see the rooftop area being developed, adding 3,000 square metres to the existing 8,000 square metres.
