= List of professional wrestling attendance records in the United Kingdom =

List of the largest attendances in the history of British professional wrestling

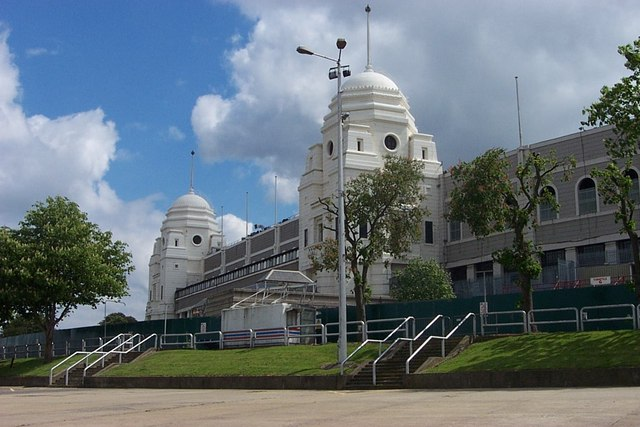
SummerSlam, held at Wembley Stadium on August 29, 1992, was attended by 78,927 fans and holds the all-time record in the United Kingdom.

The following is a list of professional wrestling attendance records in the United Kingdom. The list is dominated by the American professional wrestling promotion World Wrestling Entertainment which has controlled the industry in North America since 2002. As the World Wrestling Federation, it became the first national promotion in the U.S. during the 1980s wrestling boom. World Championship Wrestling, the main competitor to the WWF during the 1990s wrestling boom, also set several records during their visits. However, all of their events were surpassed by the WWE in the early 2000s.

In its heyday, British-based Joint Promotions and its independent rivals generally relied on intensive touring rather than major individual shows - by the mid-1960s Joint had an annual touring schedule of between 4000 and 5000 house shows including weekly residencies in over thirty cities. However, Joint regularly appeared at the Royal Albert Hall in London (capacity 5,272) and organised three major shows at Wembley Arena between 1979 and 1981 at the height of top star Big Daddy's popularity. Both venues would later host WWF and WCW shows.

The mainstream popularity of British wrestling largely declined after the cancellation of ITV's World of Sport in 1985 and then the standalone Wrestling programme on the network in 1988. (A programme continued on regional Welsh language terrestrial channel S4C until 1995.) Joint Promotions closed down in February 1995, although rival All Star Wrestling, which supplanted Joint as dominant local promotion in the late 1980s after taking over a share of the final two years of ITV coverage, survives at grassroots level as of 2026.

As a result, all of the attendance records formerly set by British wrestling promotions were gradually surpassed in the years following the WWF's arrival in the UK. The WWF's official UK debut took place on October 10, 1989, at the sold-out London Arena in London, England. The main event was a match between Hulk Hogan (with Miss Elizabeth) and Randy Savage (with Sensational Sherri) for the WWF World Heavyweight Championship. The event was broadcast live on Sky One. A similar show was held the next night in Birmingham.

This was followed by a series of high-profile UK tours, starting with the 1991 UK Rampage. By August 1992 this had culminated in the WWF holding Summerslam '92 at Wembley Stadium before nearly 80,000 fans - a live event on a scale precedented within the worldwide wrestling industry only by 1987's Wrestlemania III. WCW meanwhile, with WCW Worldwide in a graveyard slot on ITV, conducted an exploratory tour in December 1991. Fuller tours were conducted in 1993–1994 by which time ITV had moved WCW to British wrestling's old Saturday afternoon timeslot. These ceased once the company moved to pan-European satellite channel Superchannel in late 1995 but resumed after the move back to terrestrial television on Channel 5 in 1999, with two more tours in 2000 before the company closed in 2001.

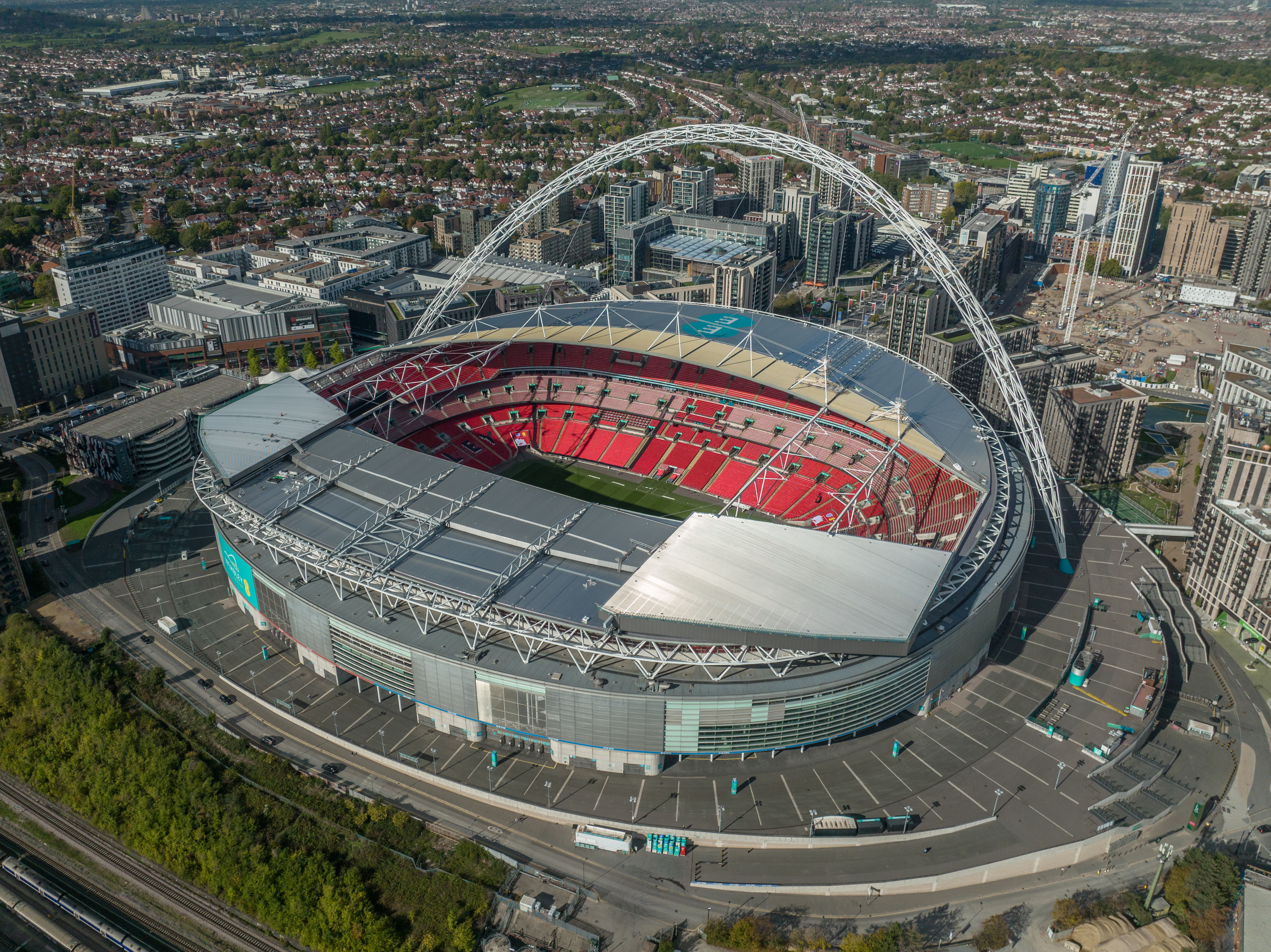
All In, held at Wembley Stadium on August 27, 2023, was attended by a paid audience of 72,265 fans. It was the first non-WWE event to challenge WWE's all-time record in the United Kingdom in over 30 years.

WWF/WWE created a series of live and PPV events, Mayhem in Manchester (1998), No Mercy (1999), Rebellion (1999–2002), Insurrextion (2000–2003), exclusively for the British market. WWE ended all-UK exclusive pay-per-views when its weekly programming began broadcasting on British television in 2004. According to this list, 13 events are from WWE's flagship television show WWE Raw and 5 from WWE Smackdown, which since 2005's has been held exclusively in stadiums that typically have a seating capacity of at least 20,000 people or more.

Only four of the attendances listed are non-WWE events, AEW's Wembley Stadium shows All In 2023 and All In 2024, AEW and NJPW's Forbidden Door 2025, and a house show during WCW Nitro U.K. Tour 2000!, which is the last remaining record set by the company. All bar one of these events have been held in England, most often in the metropolitan areas of either Manchester or the capital city of London, the exception being 2022 Cardiff, Wales WWE event Clash at the Castle. On November 15, 2015, an Insane Championship Wrestling show in Glasgow, Scotland, headlined by Grado vs. Drew Galloway, drew a sellout crowd of 3,802 fans and a $152,780 gate. It was the biggest crowd for a British-based promotion since 1982 and the largest UK gate of the "modern-era".

== Events and attendances ==
Promotion	Event	Location	Venue	Attendance	Main Event(s)	Ref.
WWF (WWE)	SummerSlam; August 29, 1992	London, England	Wembley Stadium	78,927	Bret Hart (c) vs. The British Bulldog for the WWF Intercontinental Championship	(Note: At the time of the event, "Macho Man" Randy Savage (c) vs. Ultimate Warrior for the WWF Championship was promoted as the top of the bill match. Retrospectively, WWE recognises Hart vs Bulldog as having been the main event.) (Note: 78,927 was the paid attendance for SummerSlam 1992; the total attendance for the event was 79,127.)
AEW	All In; August 27, 2023	London, England	Wembley Stadium	72,265	MJF (c) vs. Adam Cole for the AEW World Championship	(Note: Turnstile attendance was recorded at 72,265 by Brent Council. Tickets sold – a separate metric – was announced at 81,035; distributed tickets (including complimentary tickets) was estimated by wrestling journalist Dave Meltzer to between 84,000 and 85,000.)
WWE	Clash at the Castle; September 3, 2022	Cardiff, Wales	Principality Stadium	62,296	Roman Reigns (c) vs. Drew McIntyre for the Undisputed WWE Universal Championship	
AEW	All In; August 25, 2024	London, England	Wembley Stadium	46,476	Swerve Strickland (c) vs. Bryan Danielson in a Title vs. Career match for the AEW World Championship	(Note: Turnstile attendance was recorded at 46,476 by Brent Council. Tickets sold – a separate metric – was reported at 53,385.)
AEW/NJPW	Forbidden Door; August 24, 2025	London, England	The O2 Arena	18,992	Golden Lovers (Kenny Omega and Kota Ibushi), Darby Allin, Hiroshi Tanahashi, and Will Ospreay vs. Death Riders (Claudio Castagnoli and Jon Moxley), The Young Bucks (Matt Jackson and Nick Jackson), and Gabe Kidd in a Lights Out Steel Cage match	
WWE	Money in the Bank; July 1, 2023	London, England	The O2 Arena	18,885	The Bloodline (Roman Reigns and Solo Sikoa) vs. The Usos (Jey Uso and Jimmy Uso)	
WWF (WWE)	Mayhem in Manchester; April 4, 1998	Manchester, England	NYNEX Arena	18,514	The Undertaker vs. Kane	
WWF (WWE)	No Mercy; May 16, 1999	Manchester, England	Manchester Evening News Arena	18,407	Steve Austin (c) vs. Triple H vs. The Undertaker in an Anything Goes Triple Threat match for the WWF Championship	
WWE	WWE SmackDown; June 19, 2005	Manchester, England	Manchester Evening News Arena	17,500	John Cena (c) vs. John Bradshaw Layfield vs. Kurt Angle in a three-way elimination match for the WWE Championship with special referee Steve Austin	
WWE	WWE Raw (Ep. 777); April 14, 2008	London, England	The O2	17,363	Triple H vs. John Bradshaw Layfield	
WWE	WWE Raw (Ep. 1303); May 14, 2018	London, England	The O2	17,341	Bobby Lashley vs. Kevin Owens vs. Elias in a Money in the Bank qualifying match	
WWE	WWE Raw (Ep. 820); April 20, 2009	London, England	The O2	17,176	John Cena (c) vs. Edge for the WWE World Heavyweight Championship	
WWE	WWE Raw (Ep. 1039); April 22, 2013	London, England	The O2	16,603	5-woman Battle Royal to decide the number one contender for the WWE Divas Championship	
WWE	WWE Live in London; September 7, 2016	London, England	The O2	16,410	Cody Rhodes (c) vs. Shinsuke Nakamura for the Undisputed WWE Championship	
WCW	WCW Nitro U.K. Tour 2000! (Day 3); March 12, 2000	Manchester, England	Manchester Evening News Arena	16,318	The Mamalukes (Johnny the Bull and Big Vito) (c) vs. The Harris Brothers (Ron Harris and Don Harris) for the WCW World Tag Team Championship	
WWE	WWE Raw (Ep. 1662); March 31, 2025	London, England	The O2	16,276	IYO SKY (c) vs. Rhea Ripley for the WWE Women's World Championship with special referee Bianca Belair	
WWE	WWE SmackDown; November 10, 2008	London, England	The O2	16,000	Big Show vs. The Undertaker in a Falls count anywhere match	
WWF (WWE)	Insurrextion; May 5, 2001	London, England	Earls Court Exhibition Centre	15,794	The Power Trip (Steve Austin (c) and Triple H) vs. The Undertaker in a handicap match for the WWF Championship	
WWF (WWE)	Rebellion; November 3, 2001	Manchester, England	Manchester Arena	15,612	Steve Austin (c) (Alliance) vs. The Rock (WWF) for the WWF Championship	
WWE	WWE Raw (Ep. 703); November 13, 2006	Manchester, England	Manchester Evening News Arena	15,266	Ric Flair and Roddy Piper (c) vs. Rated-RKO (Edge and Randy Orton) for the WWE World Tag Team Championship	
WWE	WWE SmackDown; November 14, 2006	Manchester, England	Manchester Evening News Arena	15,000	Batista and Bobby Lashley vs. King Booker and Finlay	
WWE	WWE Raw (Ep. 1095); May 19, 2014	London, England	The O2	15,000	John Cena vs. Luke Harper	
WWE	WWE Raw (Ep. 1276); November 6, 2017	Manchester, England	Manchester Arena	15,000	The Shield (Dean Ambrose and Seth Rollins) (c) vs. The Bar (Cesaro and Sheamus) for the WWE RAW Tag Team Championship	
WWE	WWE Raw (Ep. 807); November 10, 2008	Manchester, England	Manchester Evening News Arena	14,925	Chris Jericho vs. Shawn Michaels in a Last Man Standing match	
WWE	WWE SmackDown; November 11, 2008	Manchester, England	Manchester Evening News Arena	14,700	Jeff Hardy vs. The Undertaker in an Extreme Rules match	
WWE	WWE Raw (Ep. 1250); May 8, 2017	London, England	The O2	14,500	Bray Wyatt vs. Dean Ambrose	
WWE	WWE Raw; November 3, 2012	Manchester, England	Manchester Arena	14,000	CM Punk (c) vs. Ryback for the WWE Championship	
WWE	WWE Raw (Ep. 1142); April 13, 2015	London, England	The O2	13,800	Dolph Ziggler vs. Neville	
WWE	WWE Live in London; September 7, 2016	London, England	The O2	13,750	Kevin Owens (c) vs. Sami Zayn vs. Seth Rollins in a three-way elimination match for the WWE Universal Championship	
WWE	WWE Raw (Ep. 1195); April 18, 2016	London, England	The O2	13,713	Dean Ambrose vs. Kevin Owens	
WWE	WWE SmackDown; April 19, 2016	London, England	The O2	13,713	Chris Jericho and Kevin Owens vs. Dean Ambrose and Sami Zayn	
WWE	WWE Raw (Ep. 1068); November 11, 2013	Manchester, England	Phones 4u Arena	13,612	CM Punk and Daniel Bryan vs. Dean Ambrose, Roman Reigns and Seth Rollins in a handicap match	
WWE	Rebellion; October 26, 2002	Manchester, England	Manchester Arena	13,416	Brock Lesnar (c) and Paul Heyman vs. Edge in a handicap match for the WWE Championship	

== Historical ==
Top 10 most-attended shows prior to the 1990s
No.	Promotion	Event	Location	Venue	Attendance	Main Event(s)	Ref.
1.	—	Yukio Tani vs. three opponents January 14, 1905	Edinburgh, Scotland	Waverley Market	15,000	Yukio Tani vs. three opponents	
1.	—	George Hackenschmidt vs. Alexander Munro; October 28, 1905	Glasgow, Scotland	Ibrox Park	15,000	George Hackenschmidt (c) vs. Alexander Munro in a Best 2-out-of-3 Falls match for the World Catch-As-Catch-Can Championship	
2.	—	Scottish Athletic Championship Tournament (Final Day); December 12, 1903	Edinburgh, Scotland	Waverley Market	12,000	Alec Bain vs. Jack Carkeek in a Best 2-out-of-3 Falls tournament final for the International World's Championship	
2.	—	Alexander Munro vs. Tom Jenkins; May 28, 1904	Glasgow, Scotland	Ibrox Park	12,000	Alexander Munro vs. Tom Jenkins in a Best 2-out-of-3 Falls match	
2.	—	Georg Lurich vs. A. A. Cameron; July 9, 1904	Glasgow, Scotland	Meadowside	12,000	Georg Lurich vs. A. A. Cameron	
2.	—	Alex Munro vs. Yan Kosski; November 11, 1905	Edinburgh, Scotland	Waverley Market	12,000	Alex Munro vs. Yan Kosski	
2.	—	The Great Gama vs. Stanislaus Zbyszko; September 10, 1910	London, England	Shepherd's Bush Stadium	12,000	The Great Gama vs. Stanislaus Zbyszko for the John Bull Championship	
2.	—	Bert Assirati vs. The French Angel; August 10, 1948	London, England	Tottenham Hotspur Stadium	12,000	Bert Assirati vs. The French Angel	
3.	—	Georg Strenge vs. Gustavus Rennart; June 30, 1906	Glasgow, Scotland	Celtic Park	10,000+ (Note: The exact attendance figure is unclear with various newspapers reporting numbers ranging from 10,000-25,000.)	Georg Strenge vs. Gustavus Rennart	
3.	—	Jack Carkeek vs. Alex Munro; August 15, 1903	Edinburgh, Scotland	Waverley Market	10,000+ (Note: The exact attendance figure is unclear with various newspapers reporting numbers ranging from 10,000-17,000.)	Jack Carkeek vs. Alex Munro	
3.	—	George Steadman vs. Charles Green; August 10, 1895	Morpeth, England		10,000+ (Note: The exact attendance figure is unclear with various newspapers reporting numbers ranging from 10,000-15,000.)	George Steadman vs. Charles Green	
3.	—	Paul Pons vs. Simon Antonitch; January 9, 1904	Edinburgh, Scotland	Waverley Market	10,000+	Paul Pons vs. Simon Antonitch	
3.	—	Antonio Pierri vs. George Steadman; August 2, 1890	Bridge of Allan, Scotland	Public Park	10,000+ (Note: The exact attendance figure is unclear with various newspapers reporting numbers ranging from 10,000-12,000.)	Antonio Pierri vs. George Steadman	
3.	—	Alex Munro vs. Max Muller; November 4, 1905	Edinburgh, Scotland	Waverley Market	10,000+	Alex Munro vs. Max Muller	
3.	—	Alex Munro vs. Yan Kosski; December 9, 1905	Edinburgh, Scotland	Waverley Market	10,000+	Alex Munro vs. Yan Kosski	
3.	—	Alex Munro vs. Meiler; January 10, 1906	Edinburgh, Scotland	Waverley Market	10,000+	Alex Munro vs. Meiler	
3.	—	Alex Munro vs. Alfred Kramer; January 4, 1904	Glasgow, Scotland	Ibrox Stadium	10,000	Alex Munro vs. Alfred Kramer for the British Mixed Style Championship	
3.	—	Alex Munro vs. three opponents October 8, 1904	Edinburgh, Scotland	Waverley Market	10,000	Alex Munro vs. three opponents	
3.	—	Alex Munro vs. Yan Kosski; November 7, 1905	Edinburgh, Scotland	Waverley Market	10,000	Alex Munro vs. Yan Kosski	
3.	—	Alexander Munro vs. Ahmed Madrali; January 12, 1906	Edinburgh, Scotland	Waverley Market	10,000	Alexander Munro vs. Ahmed Madrali in a Handicap match; Per the pre-match stipulation, Madrali was required to defeat Munro within 10 minutes to win the match.	
3.	—	Alex Munro vs. multiple wrestlers April 3, 1909	Edinburgh, Scotland	Waverley Market	10,000	Alex Munro vs. multiple wrestlers	
3.	Joint	Big Daddy vs. John Quinn; June 27, 1979	London, England	Wembley Arena	10,000	Big Daddy vs. John Quinn	
4.	—	Danno O'Mahoney vs. Carl Hansen; February 9, 1936	Belfast, Northern Ireland		9,000	Danno O'Mahoney (c) vs. Carl Hansen for the NWA World Heavyweight Championship	
5.	—	Paul Pons vs. Anastace Anglio; January 7, 1904	Edinburgh, Scotland	Waverley Market	8,000+ (Note: The exact attendance figure is unclear with various newspapers reporting numbers ranging from 8,000-10,000.)	Paul Pons vs. Anastace Anglio	
5.	—	Ike Smith vs. Joe Acton; July 2, 1881	Wigan, England	Ince Recreation Grounds	8,000	Ike Smith vs. Joe Acton	
5.	—	Scottish Athletic Championship Tournament (Day 1); December 5, 1903	Edinburgh, Scotland	Waverley Market	8,000	Jack Carkeek vs. J.J. Miller	
5.	—	Alex Munro vs. Yan Kosski; November 9, 1905	Edinburgh, Scotland	Waverley Market	8,000	Alex Munro vs. Yan Kosski	
5.	—	The Great Gama vs. Dr. B.F. Roller; August 6, 1910	London, England	Alhambra Theater	8,000	The Great Gama vs. Dr. B.F. Roller	
6.	—	Iman Bux vs. John Lemm; September 5, 1910	London, England	Alhambra Theater	7,500	Iman Bux vs. John Lemm	
7.	—	Ike Smith vs. Joe Acton; November 19, 1881	Chadderton, England	Moston Park Grounds	7,000+ (Note: The exact attendance figure is unclear with various newspapers reporting numbers ranging from 7,000-8,000.)	Ike Smith vs. Joe Acton	
7.	—	Tom Connors vs. Tom Clayton; May 13, 1893	Audenshaw, England	Snipe Inn Grounds	7,000	Tom Connors vs. Tom Clayton for the World Catch-As-Catch-Can Championship	
7.	—	Tom Cannon vs. Paul Pons; July 30, 1898	Walton, England	Goodison Park	7,000	Tom Cannon (c) vs. Paul Pons in a Best 2-out-of-3 Falls match for the World Greco-Roman Heavyweight Championship	
7.	—	George Hackenschmidt vs. Ahmed Madrali; January 30, 1904	London, England	Olympia Hall	7,000	George Hackenschmidt (with Ferdinand Gruhn and Jakob Koch) (c) vs. Ahmed Madrali (with Antonio Pierri and Tom Cannon) in a Best 2-out-of-3 Falls match for the World Greco-Roman Heavyweight Championship	
7.	—	Alex Munro vs. Ackbar Ackmuch & W. L. Ross; September 10, 1904	Edinburgh, Scotland	Waverley Market	7,000	Alex Munro vs. Ackbar Ackmuch and W. L. Ross	
7.	—	Yan Kosski vs. Robertson & Peterson; November 6, 1905	Edinburgh, Scotland	Waverley Market	7,000	Yan Kosski vs. Robertson and Peterson	
7.	Joint	Roy St. Clair vs. Roy Bull Davis; September 27, 1969	Manchester, England	Belle Vue	7,000	Roy St. Clair vs. Roy Bull Davis	
7.	Joint	Big Daddy vs. Giant Haystacks; October 4, 1981	London, England	Wembley Arena	7,000	Big Daddy vs. Giant Haystacks	
8.	—	Raoul le Boucher vs. Eduard Ritzler; January 4, 1904	Edinburgh, Scotland	Waverley Market	6,000+ (Note: The exact attendance figure is unclear with various newspapers reporting numbers ranging from 6,000-8,000.)	Raoul le Boucher vs. Eduard Ritzler	
8.	—	Alex Munro vs. Jack Driscoll; July 3, 1909	Rothienorman, Scotland		6,000+ (Note: The exact attendance figure is unclear with various newspapers reporting numbers ranging from 6,000-7,000.)	Alex Munro vs. Jack Driscoll	
8.	—	Ike Smith vs. Joe Acton; April 30, 1881	Farnworth, England	Larkhill Grounds	6,000	Ike Smith vs. Joe Acton	
8.	—	Ike Smith vs. Tom Connors; July 8, 1882	Oldham, England	Borough Grounds	6,000	Ike Smith vs. Tom Connors	
8.	—	Sam Moores vs. James Barker; March 3, 1883	Audenshaw, England	Snipe Inn Grounds	6,000	Sam Moores vs. James Barker	
8.	—	Tom Clayton vs. Tom Connors; June 13, 1891	Farnworth, England	Larkhill Grounds	6,000	Tom Clayton vs. Tom Connors	
8.	—	Tom Connors vs. Tom Clayton; May 25, 1895	Failsworth, England	Moorfield Recreational Grounds	6,000	Tom Connors vs. Tom Clayton in a Best 2-out-of-3 Falls match for the World Catchweight Catch-as-Catch-Can Championship	
8.	—	Evan Lewis vs. Joe Carroll; July 17, 1897	Bolton, England	Burnden Park	6,000	Evan Lewis vs. Joe Carroll for the World Catch-As-Catch-Can Championship	
8.	—	Jack Carkeek vs. Carl Beck & Victor Ajax; January 5, 1903	Edinburgh, Scotland	Waverley Market	6,000	Jack Carkeek vs. Carl Beck and Victor Ajax	
8.	—	Jim Mellor vs. Hugh Lannan; April 23, 1904	London, England	Crystal Palace Stadium	6,000	Jim Mellor vs. Hugh Lannan	
8.	—	George Hackenschmidt vs. Ahmed Madrali; April 28, 1906	London, England	Olympia Hall	6,000	George Hackenschmidt vs. Ahmed Madrali	
9.	Joint	Big Daddy & Wayne Bridges vs. John Quinn & Yasu Fuji; June 11, 1980	London, England	Wembley Arena	5,500	Big Daddy and Wayne Bridges vs. John Quinn and Yasu Fuji	
10.	—	Antonio Pierri vs. George Steadman; August 21, 1890	Grasmere, England	Pavement End	5,000+ (Note: The exact attendance figure is unclear with various newspapers reporting numbers ranging from 5,000-6,000.)	Antonio Pierri vs. George Steadman in a Best 2-out-of-3 Falls match	
10.	—	Tom Cannon vs. Tom McInerney; October 13, 1893	Liverpool, England	Hengler's Circus	5,000	Tom Cannon vs. Tom McInerney for the World Catch-As-Catch-Can Championship	
10.	—	Tom Cannon vs. George Rasso; March 29, 1894	Liverpool, England	Hengler's Circus	5,000	Tom Cannon vs. George Rasso for the World Greco-Roman Championship	
10.	—	Tom Cannon vs. Tom McInerney; August 27, 1894	Liverpool, England	Hengler's Circus	5,000	Tom Cannon vs. Tom McInerney for the World Mixed Wrestling Championship	
10.	—	Tom Cannon vs. Antonio Pierri; April 28, 1896	Liverpool, England	Hengler's Circus	5,000	Tom Cannon (c) vs. Antonio Pierri for the World Greco-Roman Heavyweight Championship	
10.	—	Tom Cannon vs. Jack Carkeek; October 2, 1899	Liverpool, England	Hengler's Circus	5,000	Tom Cannon vs. Jack Carkeek for the World Greco-Roman Championship	
10.	—	Tom Cannon vs. Jack Carkeek; October 30, 1899	Liverpool, England	Hengler's Circus	5,000	Tom Cannon vs. Jack Carkeek for the World Greco-Roman Championship	
10.	—	Jack Carkeek vs. James Morrison; August 13, 1903	Edinburgh, Scotland	Waverley Market	5,000	Jack Carkeek vs. James Morrison (Note: This was the advertised main event, but the match did not take place.)	

Top 10 most-attended shows in the 1990s
No.	Promoter	Event	Location	Venue	Attendance	Main Event(s)
1.	WWF	SummerSlam; August 29, 1992	London, England	Wembley Stadium	78,927	Bret Hart (c) vs. The British Bulldog for the WWF Intercontinental Championship
2.	WWF	Mayhem in Manchester; April 4, 1998	Manchester, England	NYNEX Arena	18,514	The Undertaker vs. Kane
3.	WWF	No Mercy; May 16, 1999	Manchester, England	Manchester Evening News Arena	18,407	Steve Austin (c) vs. Triple H vs. The Undertaker in a Anything Goes Triple Threat match for the WWF Championship
4.	WWF	No Mercy Tour; April 2, 1999	Sheffield, England	Sheffield Arena	12,744	Steve Austin (c) vs. The Rock for the WWF Championship
5.	WWF	No Mercy Tour; April 4, 1999	Birmingham, England	National Exhibition Centre	12,236	Steve Austin and Paul Wight vs. The Rock and Ken Shamrock
6.	WWF	UK Rampage Tour; October 4, 1991	London, England	Wembley Arena	12,000	The Legion of Doom (Hawk and Animal) (c) vs. The Nasty Boys (Jerry Sags and Brian Knobbs) for the WWF World Tag Team Championship
6.	WWF	UK Rampage Tour; September 29, 1992	Birmingham, England	National Exhibition Centre	12,000	Ric Flair (c) vs. Bret Hart for the WWF World Heavyweight Championship
7.	WWF	Rebellion; October 2, 1999	Birmingham, England	National Indoor Arena	11,939	Triple H (c) vs. The Rock in a Steel Cage match for the WWF Championship
8.	WCW	The Real Event; March 12, 1993	London, England	Wembley Arena	11,500	Big Van Vader (c) vs. Sting for the WCW World Heavyweight Championship
9.	WWF	UK Rampage Tour; May 2, 1991	London, England	Wembley Arena	11,000	The Ultimate Warrior vs. The Undertaker
9.	WWF	UK Rampage Tour; April 13, 1992	London, England	Wembley Arena	11,000	Randy Savage (c) vs. The Mountie for the WWF World Heavyweight Championship
9.	WWF	UK Rampage Tour; April 14, 1992	London, England	Wembley Arena	11,000	Sid Justice vs. The Undertaker
9.	WWF	WWF One Night Only; September 20, 1997	Birmingham, England	NEC Arena	11,000	The British Bulldog (c) vs. Shawn Michaels for the WWF European Championship
10.	WWF	WWF Live in Newcastle upon Tyne; April 3, 1999	Newcastle upon Tyne, England	Telewest Arena	10,699	Steve Austin (c) vs. Big Boss Man for the WWF Championship

Top 10 most-attended shows in the 2000s
No.	Promoter	Event	Location	Venue	Attendance	Main Event(s)
1.	WWE	WWE SmackDown; June 19, 2005	Manchester, England	Manchester Evening News Arena	17,500	John Cena (c) vs. John Bradshaw Layfield vs. Kurt Angle in a three-way elimination match for the WWE Championship with special referee Steve Austin
2.	WWE	WWE Raw (Ep. 777); April 14, 2008	London, England	The O2	17,363	Triple H vs John Bradshaw Layfield
3.	WWE	WWE Raw (Ep. 820); April 20, 2009	London, England	The O2	17,176	John Cena (c) vs. Edge for the WWE World Heavyweight Championship
4.	WCW	WCW Nitro U.K. Tour 2000! (Day 3); March 12, 2000	Manchester, England	Manchester Evening News Arena	16,318	The Mamalukes (Johnny the Bull and Big Vito) (c) vs. The Harris Brothers (Ron Harris and Don Harris) for the WCW World Tag Team Championship
5.	WWE	WWE SmackDown; November 10, 2008	London, England	The O2	16,000	Big Show vs. The Undertaker in a Falls count anywhere match
6.	WWF	Insurrextion; May 5, 2001	London, England	Earls Court Exhibition Centre	15,794	The Power Trip (Steve Austin (c) and Triple H) vs. The Undertaker for the handicap match for the WWF Championship
7.	WWF	Rebellion; November 3, 2001	Manchester, England	Manchester Arena	15,612	Steve Austin (c) (Alliance) vs. The Rock (WWF) in a match for the WWF Championship
8.	WWE	WWE Raw (Ep. 703); November 13, 2006	Manchester, England	Manchester Evening News Arena	15,266	Ric Flair and Roddy Piper (c) vs. Rated-RKO (Edge and Randy Orton) for the WWE World Tag Team Championship
9.	WWE	WWE SmackDown; November 14, 2006	Manchester, England	Manchester Evening News Arena	15,000	Batista and Bobby Lashley vs. King Booker and Finlay
10.	WWE	WWE Raw (Ep. 807); November 10, 2008	Manchester, England	Manchester Evening News Arena	14,925	Chris Jericho vs. Shawn Michaels in a Last Man Standing match

Top 10 most-attended shows in the 2010s
No.	Promoter	Event	Location	Venue	Attendance	Main Event(s)
1.	WWE	WWE Raw (Ep. 1303); May 14, 2018	London, England	The O2	17,341	Bobby Lashley vs. Kevin Owens vs. Elias in a Money in the Bank qualifying match
2.	WWE	WWE Raw (Ep. 1039); April 22, 2013	London, England	The O2	16,603	5-woman Battle Royal to decide the number one contender for the WWE Divas Championship
3.	WWE	WWE Raw (Ep. 1095); May 19, 2014	London, England	The O2	15,000	John Cena vs. Luke Harper
3.	WWE	WWE Raw (Ep. 1276); November 6, 2017	Manchester, England	Manchester Arena	15,000	The Shield (Dean Ambrose and Seth Rollins) (c) vs. The Bar (Cesaro and Sheamus) for the WWE RAW Tag Team Championship
4.	WWE	WWE Raw (Ep. 1250); May 8, 2017	London, England	The O2	14,500	Bray Wyatt vs. Dean Ambrose
5.	WWE	WWE Raw; November 3, 2012	Manchester, England	Manchester Arena	14,000	CM Punk (c) vs. Ryback for the WWE Championship
6.	WWE	WWE Raw (Ep. 1142); April 13, 2015	London, England	The O2	13,800	Dolph Ziggler vs. Neville
7.	WWE	WWE Live in London; September 7, 2016	London, England	The O2	13,750	Kevin Owens (c) vs. Sami Zayn vs. Seth Rollins in a three-way elimination match for the WWE Universal Championship
8.	WWE	WWE Raw (Ep. 1195); April 18, 2016	London, England	The O2	13,713	Dean Ambrose vs. Kevin Owens
8.	WWE	WWE SmackDown; April 19, 2016	London, England	The O2	13,713	Chris Jericho and Kevin Owens vs. Dean Ambrose and Sami Zayn
9.	WWE	WWE Raw (Ep. 1068); November 11, 2013	Manchester, England	Phones 4u Arena	13,612	CM Punk and Daniel Bryan vs. Dean Ambrose, Roman Reigns and Seth Rollins in a handicap match
10.	WWE	WWE RAW (Ep. 881); April 12, 2010	London, England	The O2	13,000	Randy Orton (c) vs. Batista for the WWE Championship
10.	WWE	WWE Live in Manchester; November 5, 2016	Manchester, England	Manchester Arena	13,000	AJ Styles (c) vs. Dean Ambrose for the WWE World Championship

== See also ==
- List of professional wrestling attendance records
- List of professional wrestling attendance records in Europe
- List of professional wrestling attendance records in Japan
- List of professional wrestling attendance records in Puerto Rico
- List of WWE attendance records
- List of professional wrestling attendance records in Oceania
