= William Hamilton Beattie =

Scottish architect (1842–1898)

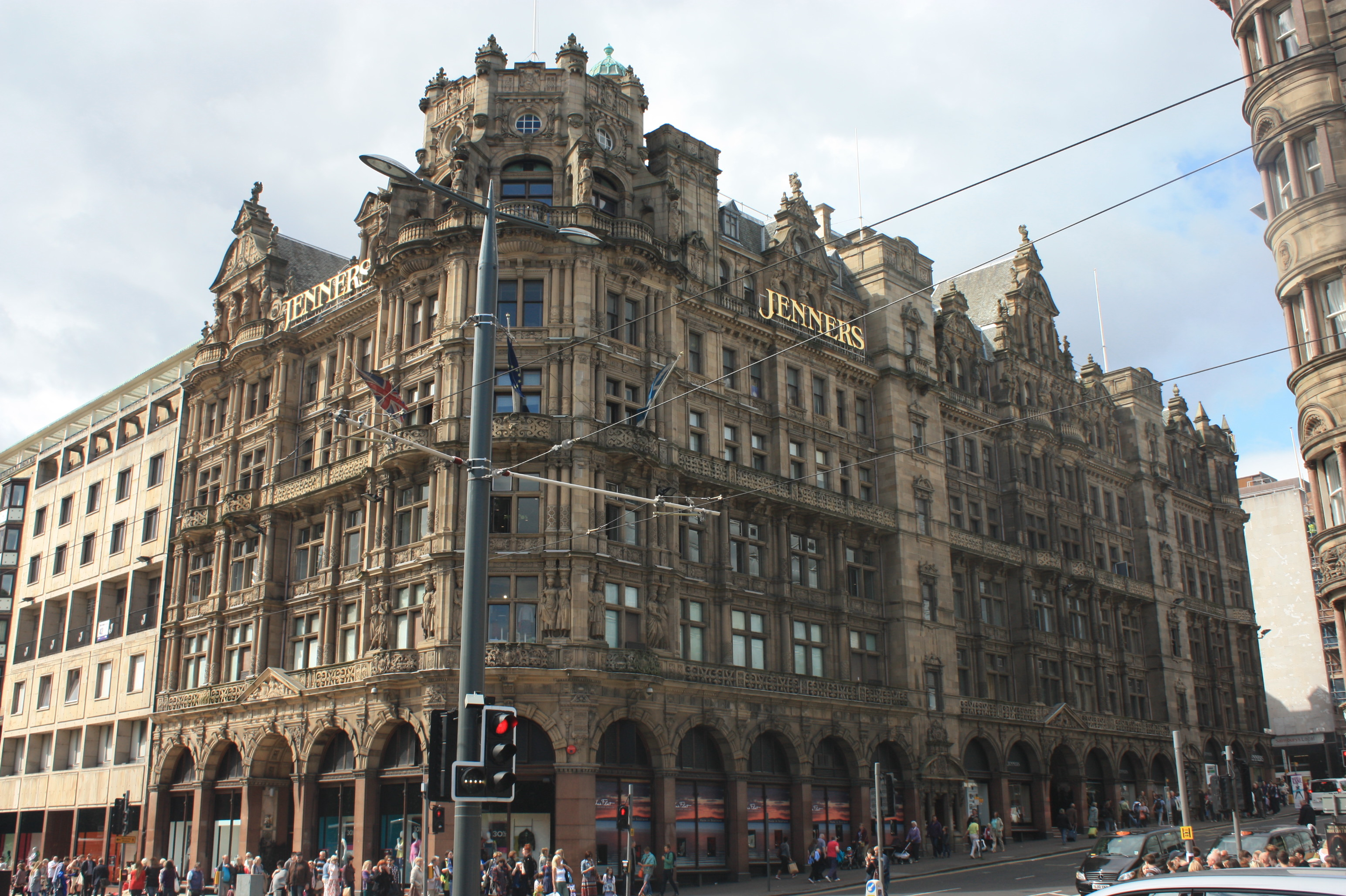
Jenners, Princes St, Edinburgh

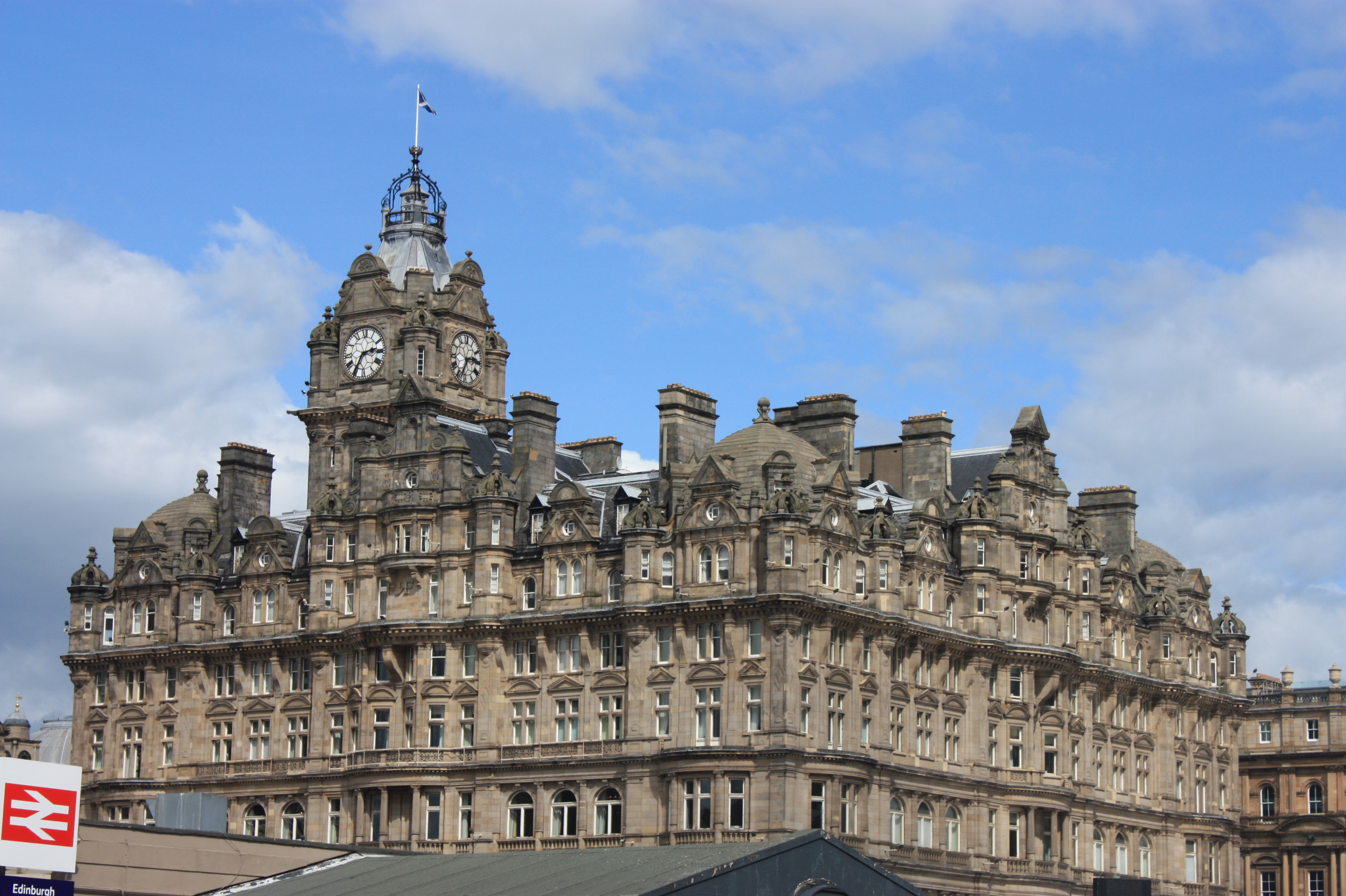
Balmoral Hotel, Edinburgh from SW

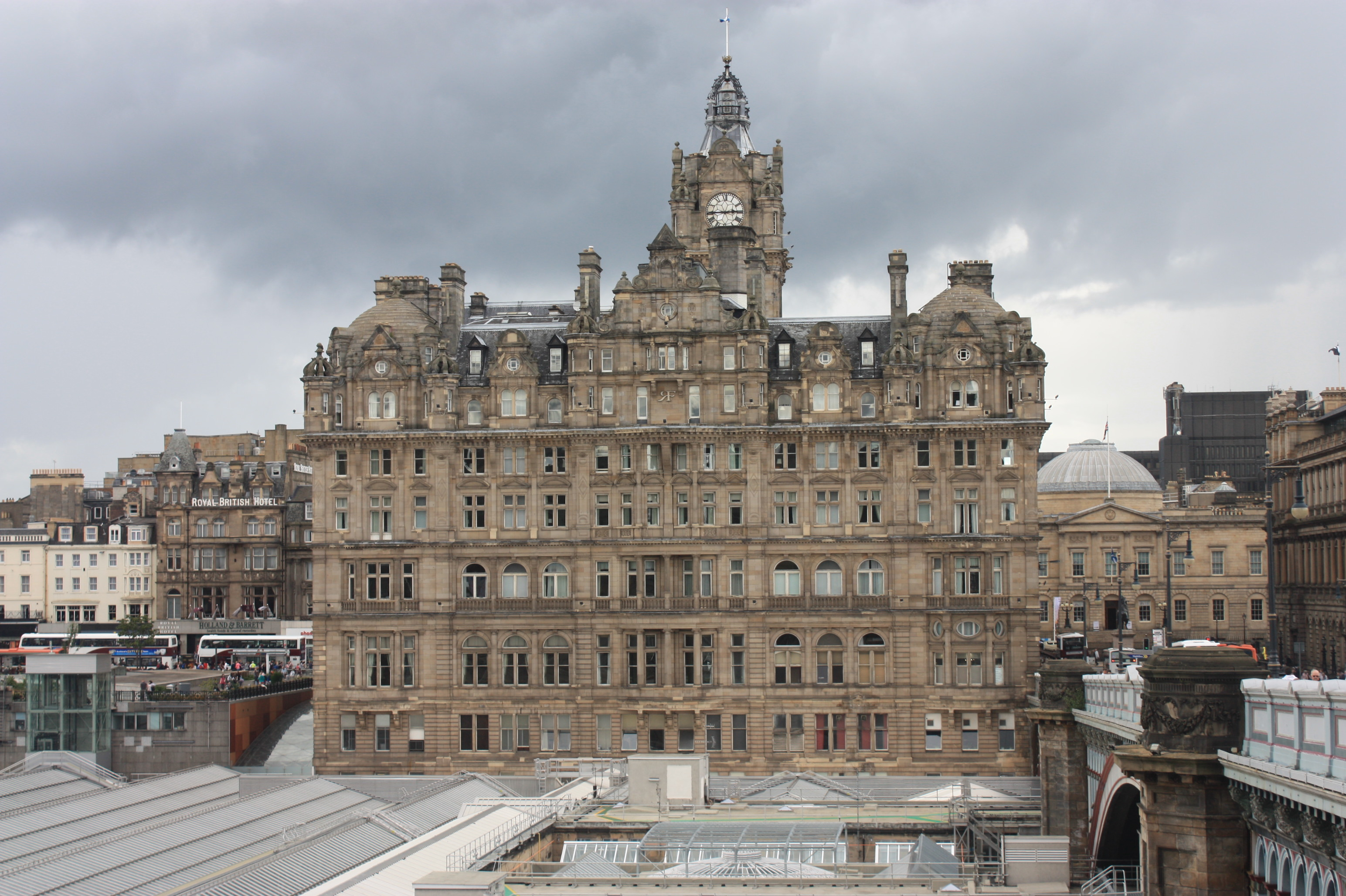
The Balmoral Hotel as seen from the south

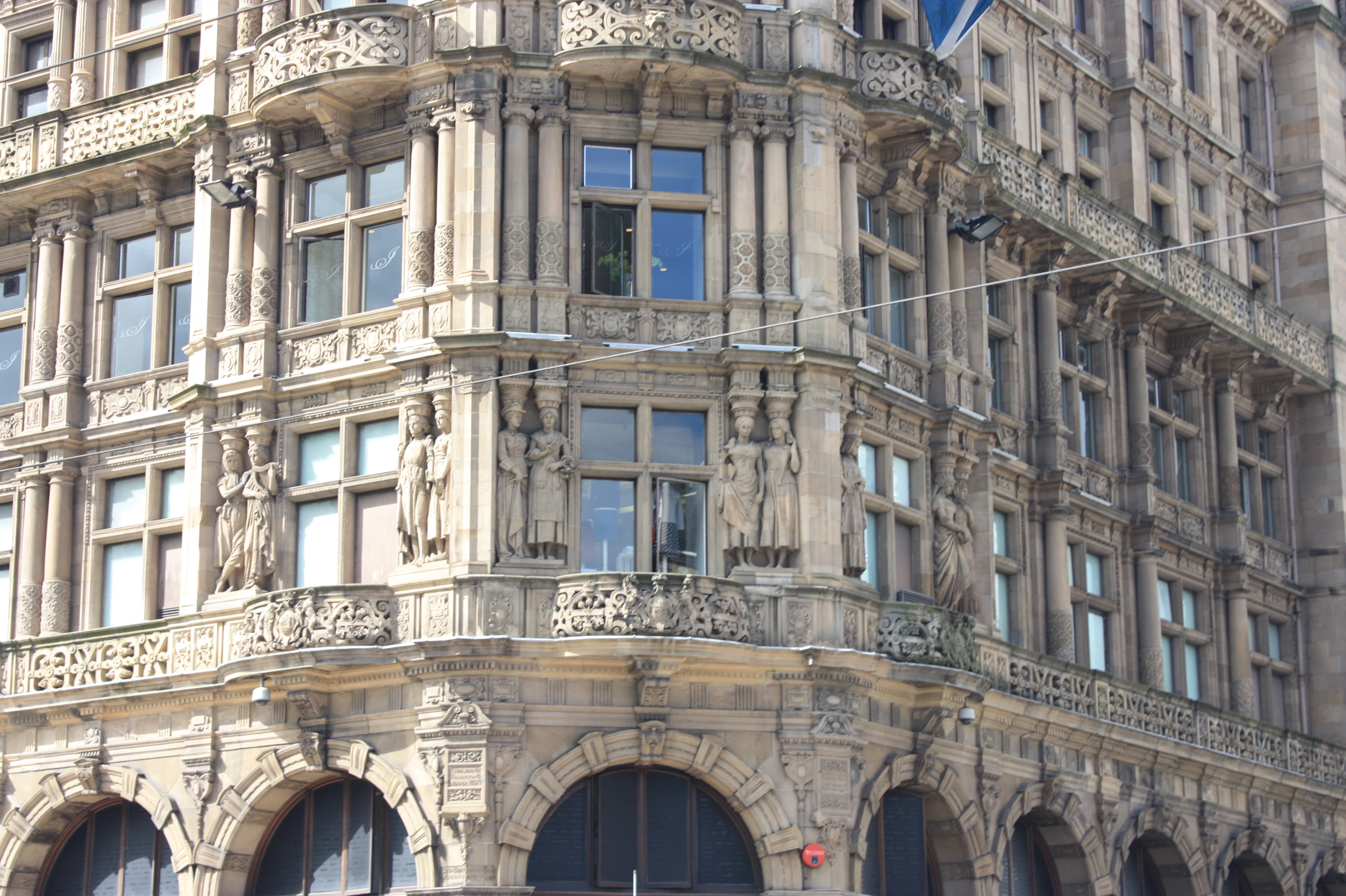
Jenners Princes St corner detail

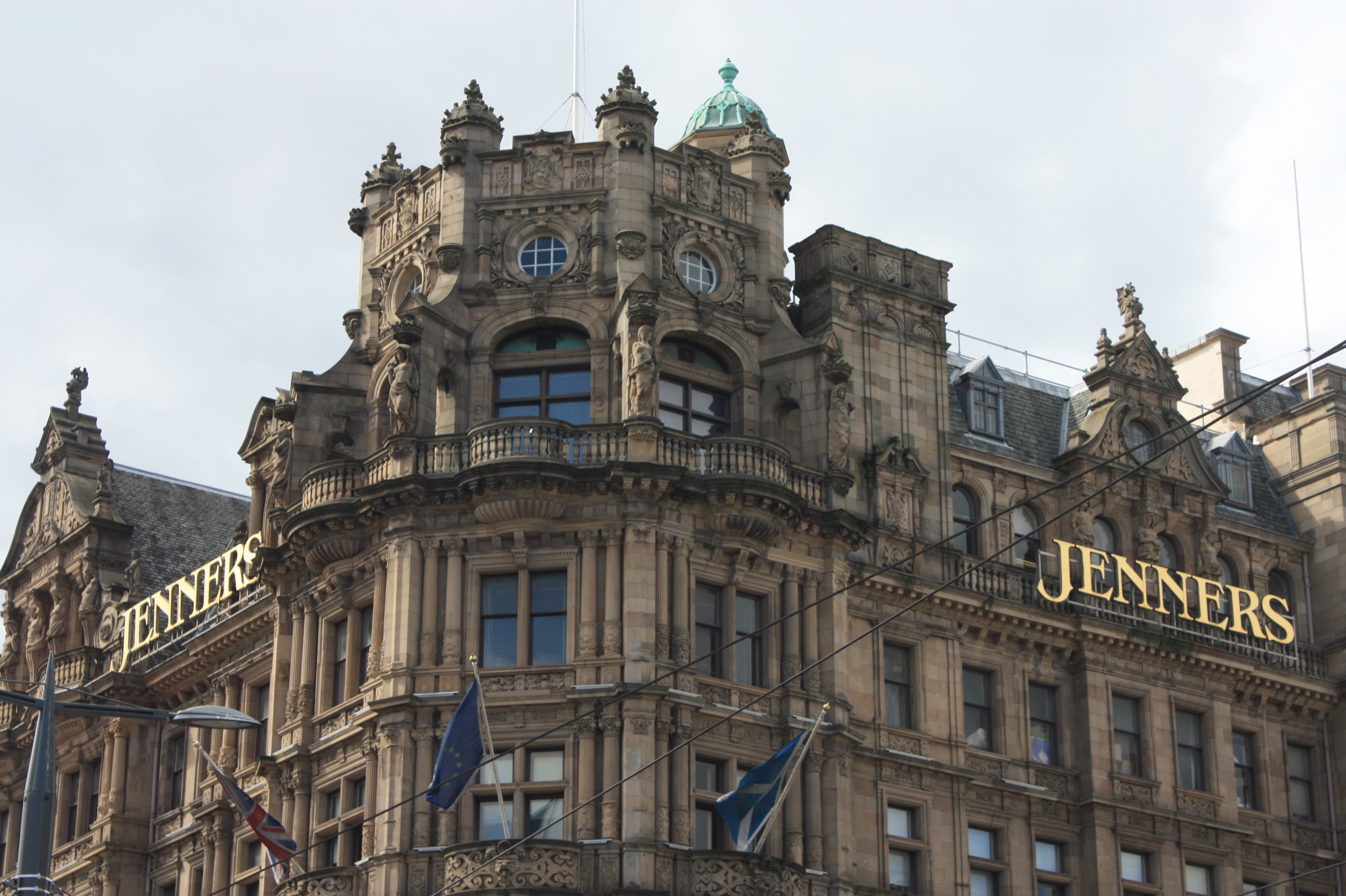
Jenners Princes St crown detail

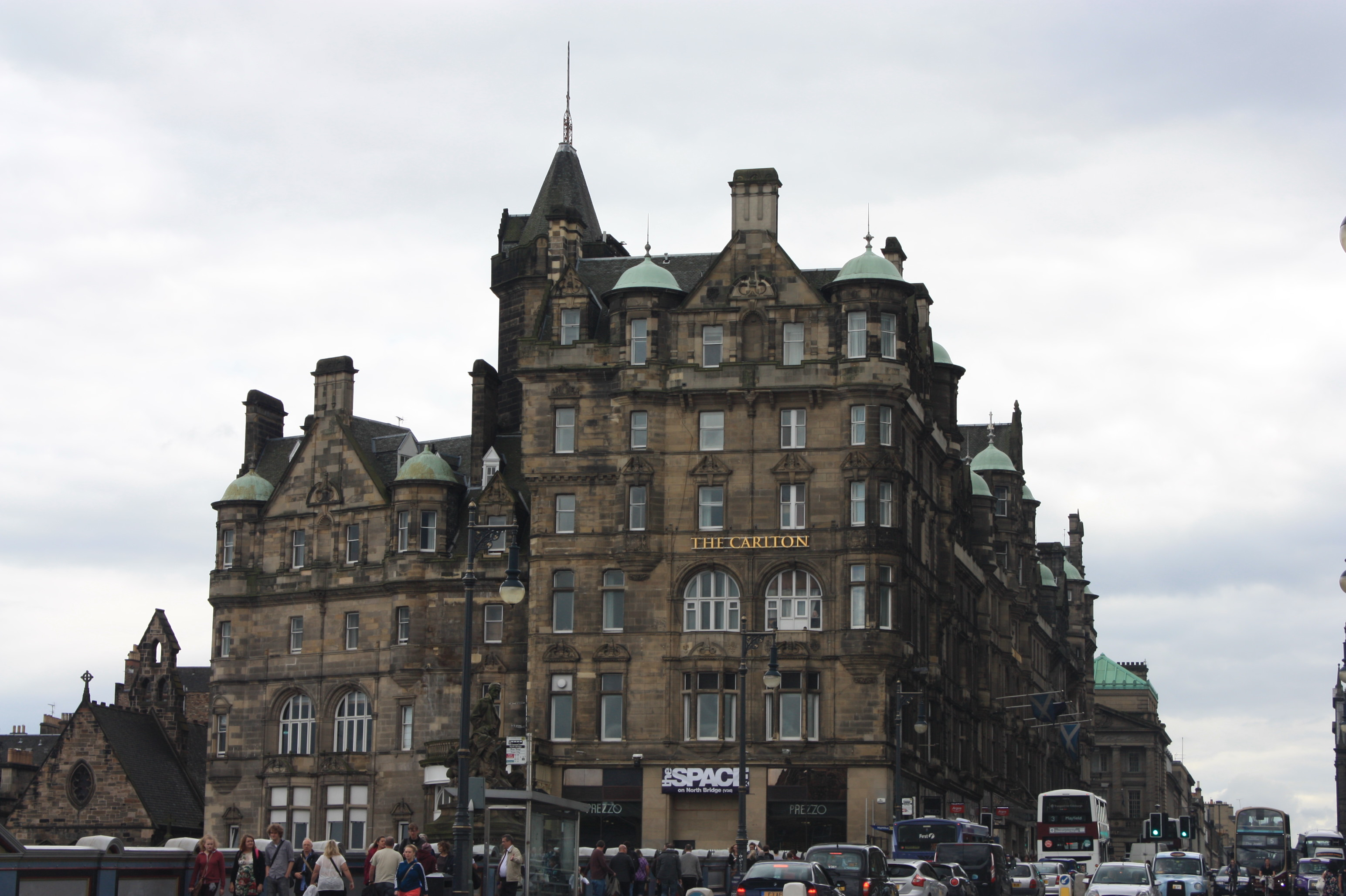
Carlton Hotel, Edinburgh north side

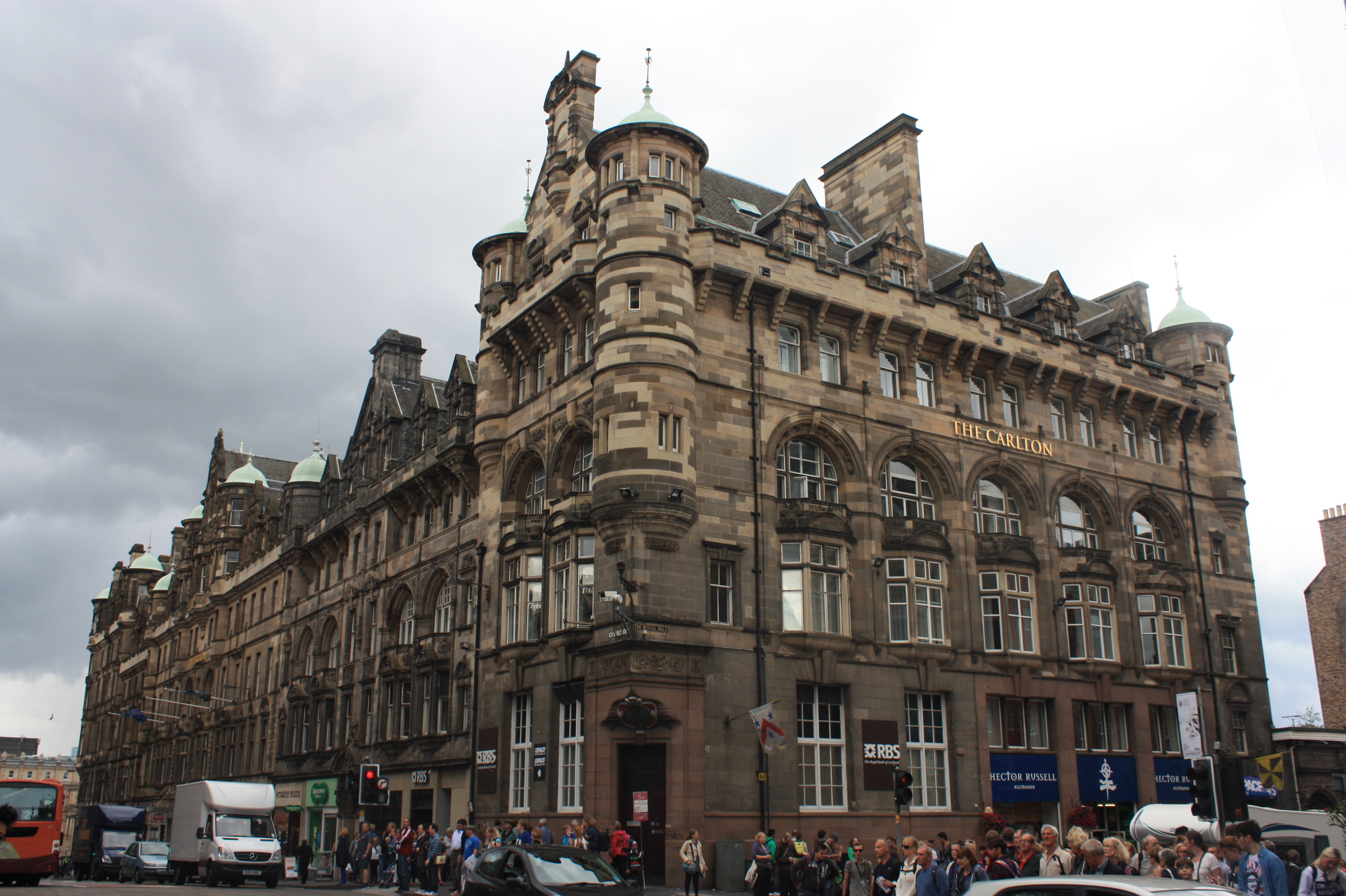
The Carlton Hotel as seen from the Royal Mile

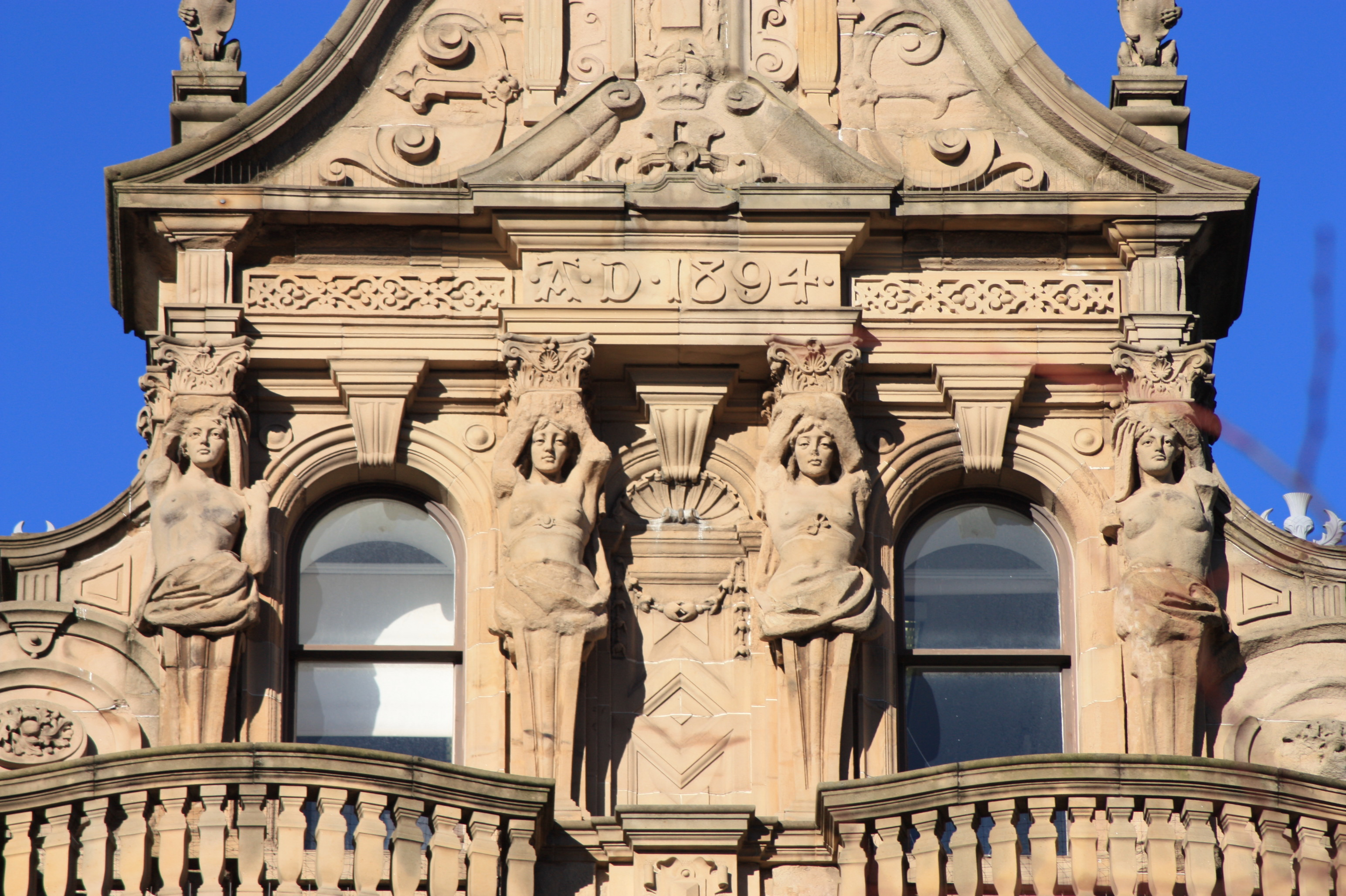
Rooftop detail, Jenners Department Store, Princes Street, Edinburgh

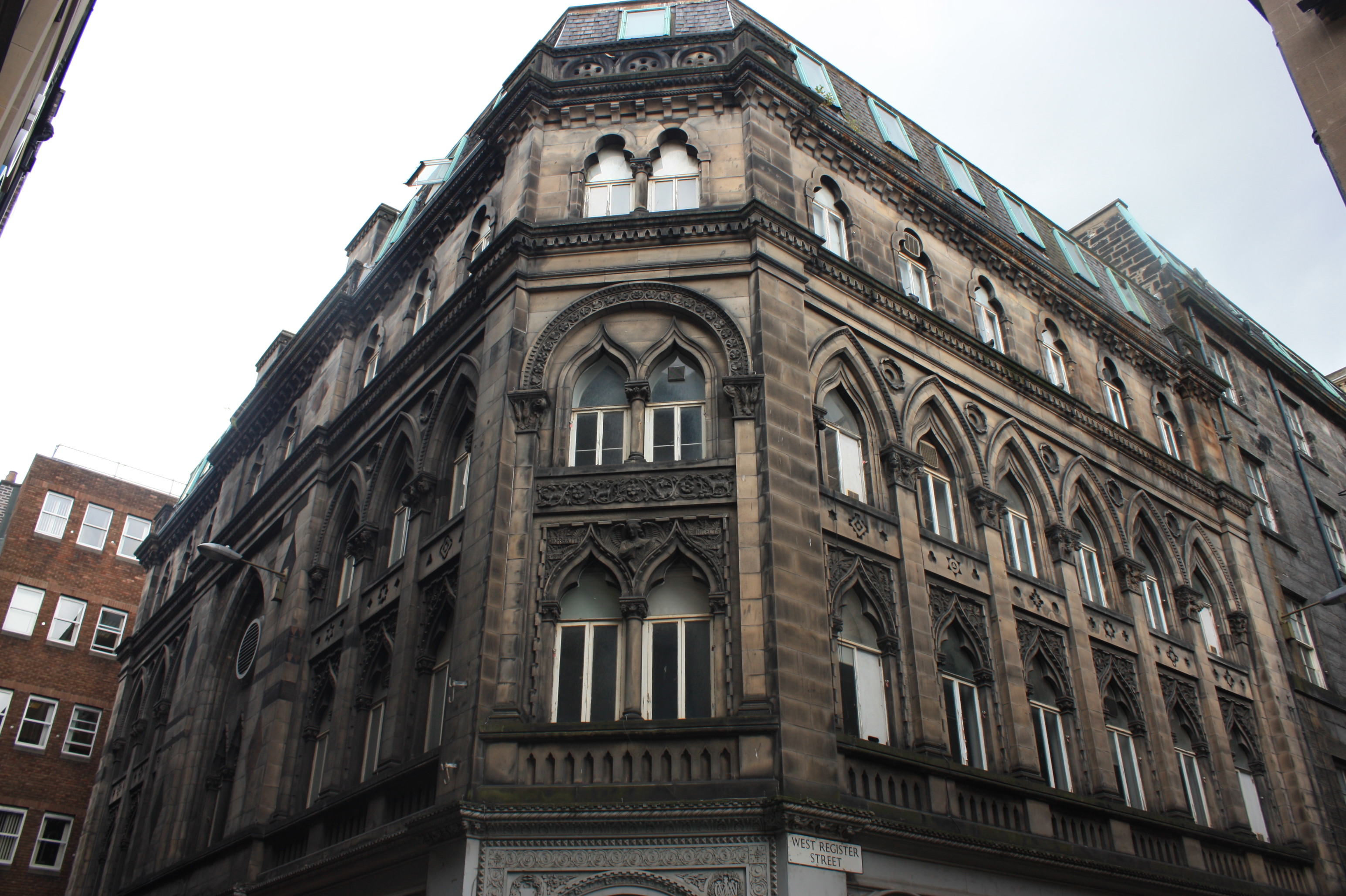
Cowan's Warehouse, West Register St, Edinburgh

William Hamilton Beattie (10 December 1842 – 29 November 1898) was a Scottish architect specialising in hotel design in the late 19th century.

He was the eldest son of George Beattie (1810-1872) an architect/builder in Edinburgh and older brother to George Lennox Beattie (1862-1932), who also became an architect and continued the practise after William Hamilton's death.

He was christened simply William Beattie and did not adopt the name Hamilton (a family name) until 1877, by which time his career was taking off and a three part name better suited his aspirations to individuality.

== Career ==
He trained under David Bryce from 1855 but returned to the family to create "George Beattie & Son", based at 17 Grove street, around 1860. He brought a distinctive flair to the company not visible in the earlier works of his father.

One of his earliest works (1864) is a hidden gem just off Princes Street on West Register Street. It is an unbelievably ornate Venetian Gothic printworks/warehouse for the Cowan Brothers, strangely ornate both for its use and location. It was listed category B in 1970.

His skills quickly brought commissions and he particularly began to specialise in hotel design, especially huge railway hotels, which were becoming more common in the late 19th century.

Also noteworthy is his contribution of a cable-drawn tram system in Edinburgh based on the then newly devised system by Andrew Smith Hallidie in San Francisco. This work required a Bill to be passed. This failed for an original comprehensive system but an amended Bill approved a route from Henderson Row to Goldenacre with a second route from Frederick Street to Comely Bank was approved on 7 August 1884. Edinburgh's first tram route was duly opened on 28 January 1889. This system was extremely neat (with no overhead wires) but did require considerable maintenance. Part of the original winding gear and part of the original depot is preserved as part of the Scottish Life Assurance Offices on Henderson Row.

In 1893 he received a particularly fine commission from Charles Jenner to rebuild his store on Princes Street to create "Jenner’s", which was at the time one of Britain's largest and most ornate purpose-built department stores.

His final tour-de-force is probably the North British Hotel (now the Balmoral Hotel) begun in 1895 but not completed until 1902 due to its immense scale. This is now an iconic part of the Edinburgh skyline. Beattie died before its completion, Andrew Robb Scott oversaw that task.

Beattie died of a cerebral haemorrhage at his home, 13 Douglas Crescent in Edinburgh on 29 November 1898. His will left over £42,000, the largest sum ever left by a Scottish architect at that time, and (adjusted for inflation) probably still the richest architect Scotland has ever produced.

He is buried in Dean Cemetery.

== Family ==
Beattie married Iona Mary McCaskie (born 1847) but outlived her by almost ten years, as she died on 30 December 1889. He is presumed to have designed her monument where he now lies with her.

They had one son, Ivor Hamilton Beattie (b. 1886; d. Suva, Fiji 1957) who forwent the family tradition of architecture and taught physics at Christ Church, Oxford. Ivor moved to Fiji in 1924 where he practiced medicine and designed the Lilac Theatre in Suva. Hamilton-Beattie Street in Suva was named in memory of him.

== Works ==
- Hotel, 16 Princes Street, Edinburgh (now the Royal British Hotel) (1864)
- Warehouse for the printers, Cowan & Co, West Register Street, Edinburgh (1864)
- Edinburgh City Poorhouse, Greenbank Drive, Craiglockhart (now converted to housing) (1865)
- Additional housing Greenbank Drive and the Steils (linked to above) (1867)
- Grove Street Mission Church (adjacent to their offices) (1872)
- 38-50 Shandwick Place (1873)
- Group of tenements Cranston Street/Canongate/Jeffrey Street (1873)
- Tenement, 1-5 Angle Park Terrace (1874)
- The Castle Brewery, Canongate (1875)
- The Clarendon Hotel and shopping arcade, 104-106 Princes Street (1875)
- Easter Duddingston House (1875)
- Additions to the Hydropathic Institution, North Berwick (1875)
- Art galleries and auction rooms, The Albert Buildings, 22-30 Shandwick Place (1876-7) (sculpture by Amelia Robertson Hill)
- YMCA, Edinburgh (1876)
- Dalry Road School (1877)
- Houses on West Mayfield (1877)
- Canongate School (1878) (demolished)
- Tenements at Goldenacre (1879)
- Auction rooms at 18 George Street (1879)
- Hydropathic Hotel, Morningside (1879)
- Feuing layout for the Plewlands area, South Morningside (1879)
- 8-11 Hillside Crescent (1880) (adopting William Henry Playfair’s overall plan)
- New Edinburgh Veterinary College on Elm Row (1882) for William Williams
- Victorian Turkish baths, Casselbank Street, Leith (1885)
- Braid Hills Hotel (1886)
- Northern Cable Tramway, including Engine House and Sheds on Henderson Row (1886)
- 2-10 Braid Crescent (1887)
- Grand Hotel, Lerwick, Shetland (1887)
- 176-196 Bruntsfield Place (1889)
- Broomieknowe, Lasswade (1889)
- Jenner's Department Store, Princes Street (1893-5)
- Tenement, Howard Street (1895)
- Carlton Hotel, Edinburgh (1898)
- Royal Insurance Offices, 13 George Street (now part of Scottish Life Buildings) (1898)
- North British Hotel (now the Balmoral Hotel) (1895-1902)
- Bonnington Bond (a huge brick whisky bond on Anderson Place in Leith now converted to flats) (1898). – note- as this structure is more civil engineering than architecture it may include a higher proportion of work by his younger, engineer brother, George Lennox Beattie.
