= Balmoral Hotel =

Luxury hotel in Edinburgh, Scotland

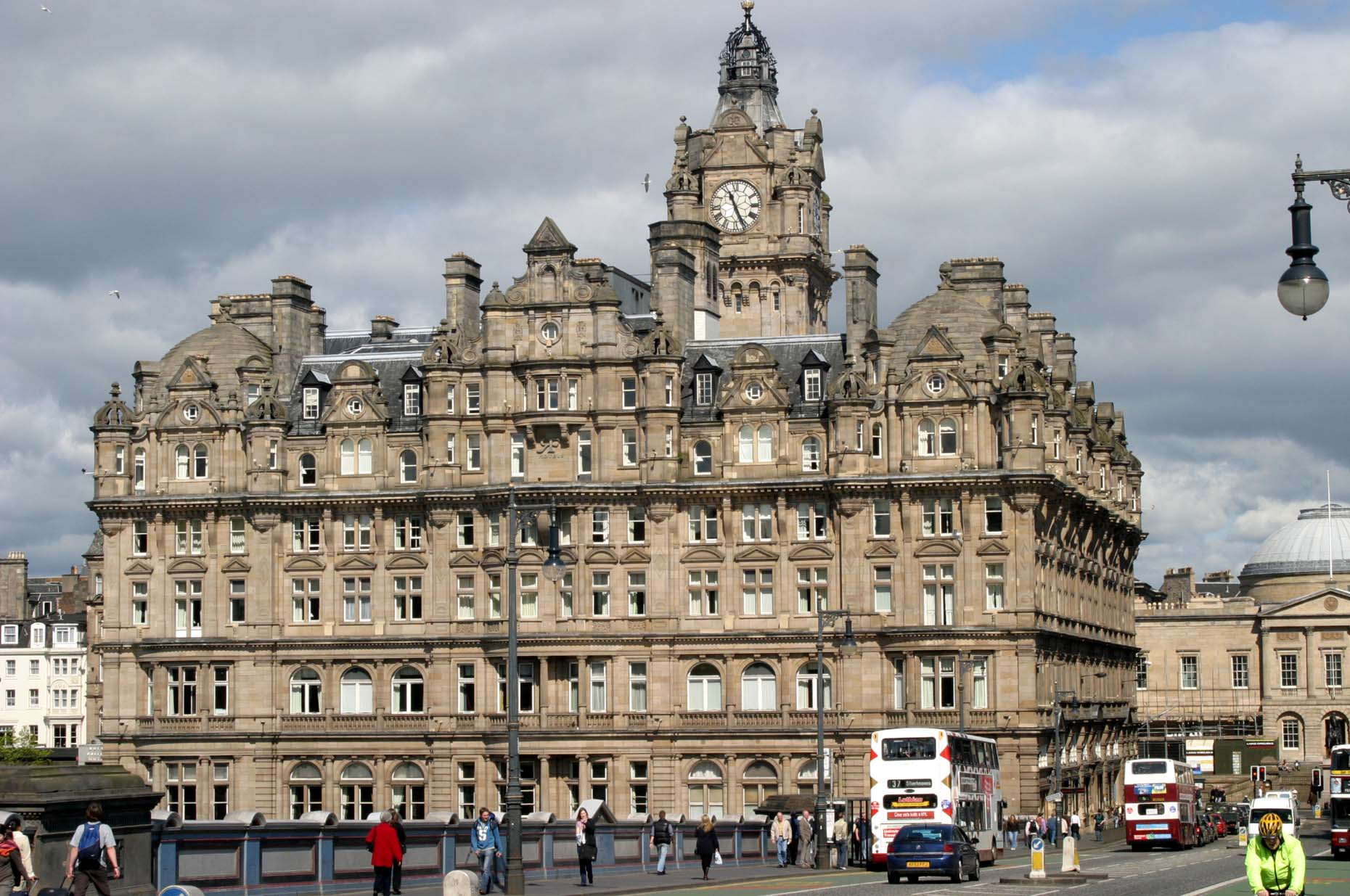
- The Balmoral Hotel seen from North Bridge
- Former names: North British Hotel

General information
- Architectural style: Victorian with elements of Scots baronial
- Location: 1 Princes Street; Edinburgh; EH2 2EQ
- Construction started: 1896
- Opened: 1902
- Owner: Rocco Forte Hotels

Technical details
- Material: Sandstone

Design and construction
- Architect: William Hamilton Beattie

Other information
- Number of rooms: 167
- Number of suites: 20
- Number of restaurants: 3 (Brasserie Prince; Number One; Palm Court)
- Number of bars: 3 (Bar Prince; The Gallery; Scotch)
- Parking: Valet parking
- Public transit: St Andrew Square; Edinburgh Waverley

Website
- www.roccofortehotels.com/hotels-and-resorts/the-balmoral-hotel/

Listed Building – Category B
- Official name: 1 Princes Street and 2-18 (Even Nos) North Bridge, The Balmoral Hotel (Former North British Hotel)
- Designated: 14 June 1994
- Reference no.: LB30315

The Balmoral Hotel is a hotel and landmark in Edinburgh, Scotland. It is located in the heart of the city at the east end of Princes Street, the main shopping street beneath the Edinburgh Castle rock, and the southern edge of the New Town.

It is accessed from Princes Street, on its north side, and flanked by North Bridge and Waverley Steps. The latter gives pedestrian access to Waverley Station to the south, to which it was formerly linked. The hotel has been a Category B listed building since 1994.

== History ==
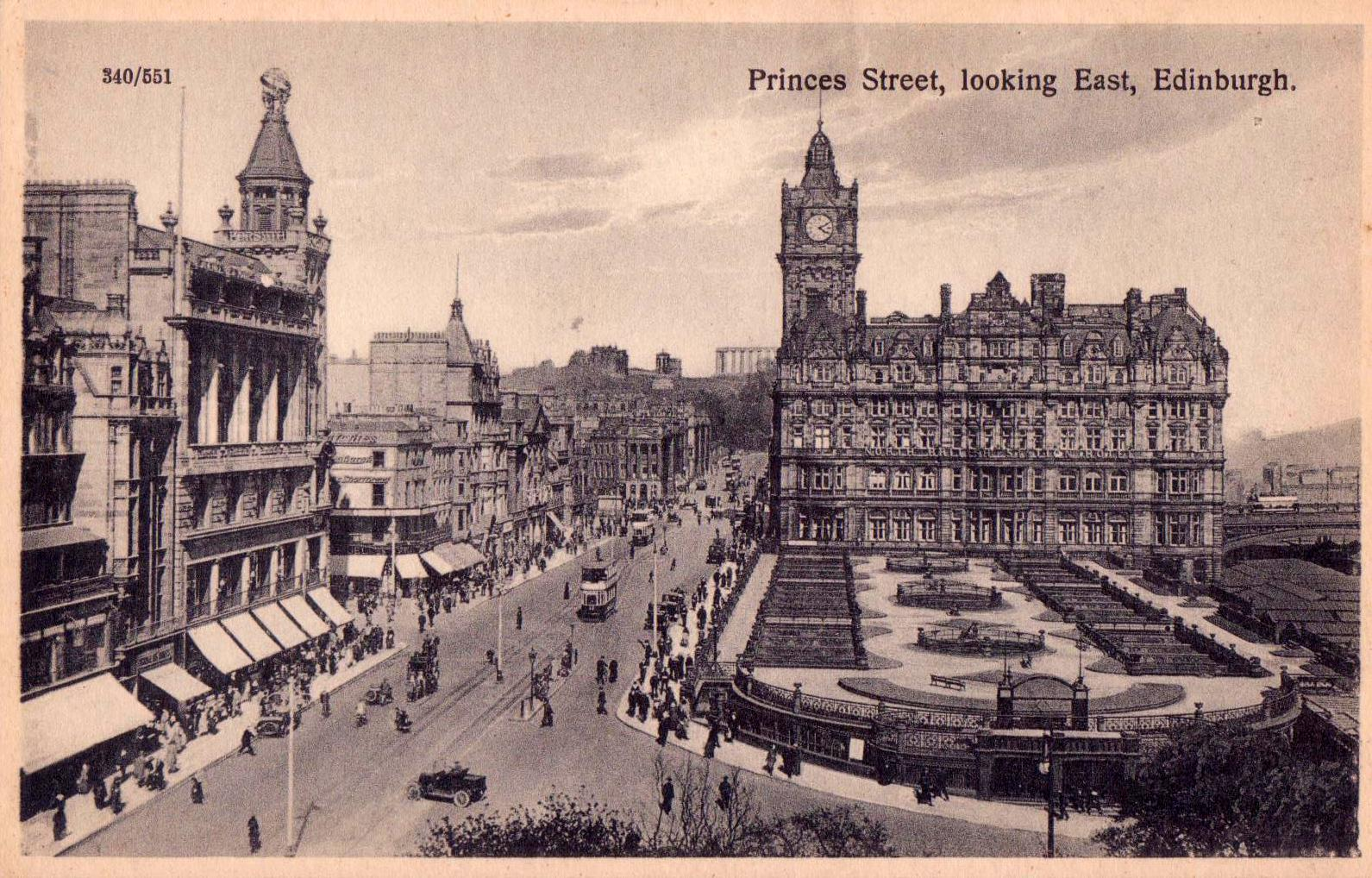
The Balmoral Hotel in an early postcard

Resulting from a competition in 1895, the hotel was designed by William Hamilton Beattie for the North British Railway Company as a railway hotel adjacent to their newly rebuilt Waverley station. It was completed after Beattie's death by his assistant Andrew Robb Scott and opened as the North British Station Hotel on 15 October 1902. A shop, 52 North Bridge, part of the earlier, demolished, building on the site, was previously the location of pharmacists Duncan, Flockhart and company; William Flockhart supplied James Young Simpson with the first chloroform anaesthetic, which he tried on himself at his home 52 Queen Street in 1847, and became standard practice in childbirth. The International Association for the Study of Pain placed a commemorative plaque at the hotel in 1981.

The building's architecture is Victorian, influenced by the traditional Scottish baronial style. For most of the 20th century it was known as the North British Hotel or the N.B. While under railway ownership, the hotel had porters in red jackets who would take passengers and their luggage directly into the hotel via a lift. Ownership passed into the hands of the London & North Eastern Railway (LNER) in 1923.

After nationalisation of the railways in 1948, the hotel became part of British Transport Hotels until it was privatised and purchased by The Gleneagles Hotel Company in 1983.

In 1988, the hotel closed for a major refurbishment with a final cost of £23,000,000, and the building was purchased in 1990 by Balmoral International Hotels. On 12 June 1991, the Edinburgh-born actor Sean Connery officially reopened the hotel as The Balmoral, Gaelic for "majestic dwelling"; as commemorated by a plaque in the hotel lobby. The Balmoral was acquired by Forte Group, becoming part of the "Forte Grand" collection of international high-end hotels. Following a hostile takeover of Forte Group in 1996 by Granada plc, the hotel was put up for sale by its new owners. On 1 March 1997 it was acquired by Sir Rocco Forte, becoming part of Rocco Forte Hotels.

The Balmoral was the first hotel in Scotland to be awarded five stars by Forbes Travel Guide. The Number One restaurant under executive chef Jeff Bland was awarded a Michelin star in 2003, but lost its star in 2022. The main event spaces and those bedrooms with views of Edinburgh Castle were refurbished in 2017.

== Clock ==
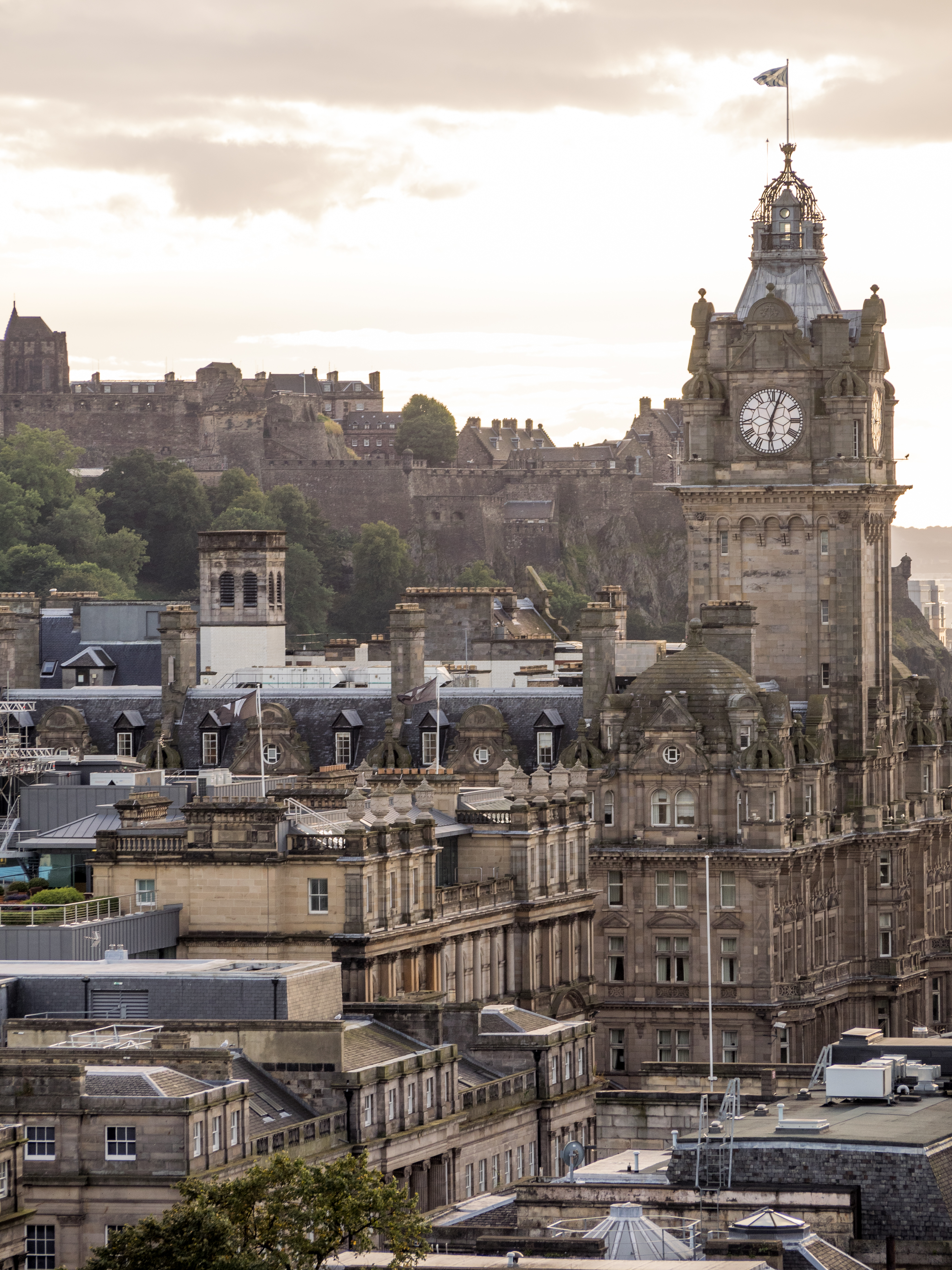
Clock tower

The hotel's clock tower, at 190 feet (58 m) high, is a prominent landmark in Edinburgh's city centre. The four dials are 13 feet (4.0 m) in diameter, the minute hands are 6 feet 3 inches (1.91 m) long and the hour hands 4 feet 6 inches (1.37 m) long. It was designed and built by Hamilton & Inches. It was converted to electric winding in 1974. It is maintained by the Scottish clockmakers James Ritchie & Son, now a subsidiary of the Smith of Derby Group.

The clock is famously set to run three minutes fast, to give passengers more time to catch their trains. The only day that it shows the correct time is 31 December (Hogmanay), for the city's New Year celebrations. In 2020, the hotel decided not to set the clock right for that year's Hogmanay, citing a desire to have three minutes less of that year, although the practice resumed in subsequent years.

The clock's original mechanism was replaced by a computer-controlled system in 2014, after a fault in one of the cogs caused the clock to stop several times over a six-week period. The original mechanism, although no longer in use, is still present in the tower; it has not been moved because of its weight.

== Media ==
=== Laurel and Hardy (1932) ===
In July 1932 the British-American comedy duo Laurel and Hardy visited the North British Station Hotel as part of their visit to Edinburgh. Crowds gathered outside the hotel to catch a glimpse of them; the occasion was captured in one of the earliest videos of the hotel captured on film.

=== Great Railway Journeys of the World (1980) ===
Michael Palin stays in the North British Hotel in episode 4 of Great Railway Journeys of the World "Confessions of a Trainspotter" on his Edinburgh leg on his journey from London to Kyle of Lochalsh during the 1980 Edinburgh Festival.

=== J. K. Rowling and Harry Potter (2007) ===
In 2007 J. K. Rowling finished the last book in her Harry Potter series, Harry Potter and the Deathly Hallows, at the Balmoral Hotel. Rowling left a signed statement written on a marble bust of Hermes in her room: "JK Rowling finished writing Harry Potter and the Deathly Hallows in this room (552) on 11th Jan 2007." The room has since been renamed the "J. K. Rowling Suite", and the bust has been placed in a glass display case to protect it. The suite is a pilgrimage site for Harry Potter fans.

In October 2010, Oprah Winfrey filmed a one-hour episode of Oprah at The Balmoral. She interviewed Rowling from room 230, the Scone & Crombie Royal Suite. Rowling spoke about finishing Deathly Hallows at the hotel.
