= Waverley Steps =

Steps in Edinburgh, Scotland

Coordinates: 55.952811°N 3.190015°W

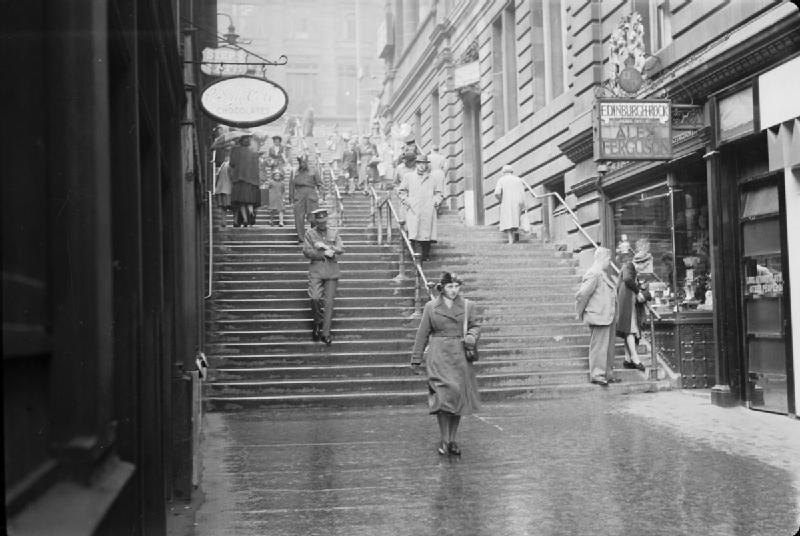
Waverley Steps in 1943

Waverley Steps is a staircase which links Princes Street, Edinburgh and Waverley station.

== History ==
The staircase was opened in 1902 as part of the development of the adjacent North British Hotel (the present-day Balmoral Hotel), which at the time belonged to the North British Railway Company together with Waverley station.

The steps are flanked by original 1902 shops on the east and Waverley Market on the west. Waverley Market was originally a Victorian multi-level structure built on the site of a stone quarry. The original market was demolished in 1974 having become structurally unstable, and redeveloped ten years later as a multi-level underground shopping mall. It has been remodelled several times since then in an effort to increase its popularity, but with limited success.

In 2010 Network Rail, the present owners of the station, replaced the original staircase with new stairs, an escalator and a lift (to the south) and added a weather-proof glass-and-steel canopy. The new steps were opened in 2012. This was primarily to provide disabled access. From 2012 the steps can be closed at the Princes Street entrance when the station is closed.
