= U.S. Navy and U.S. Marine Corps aircraft tail codes =

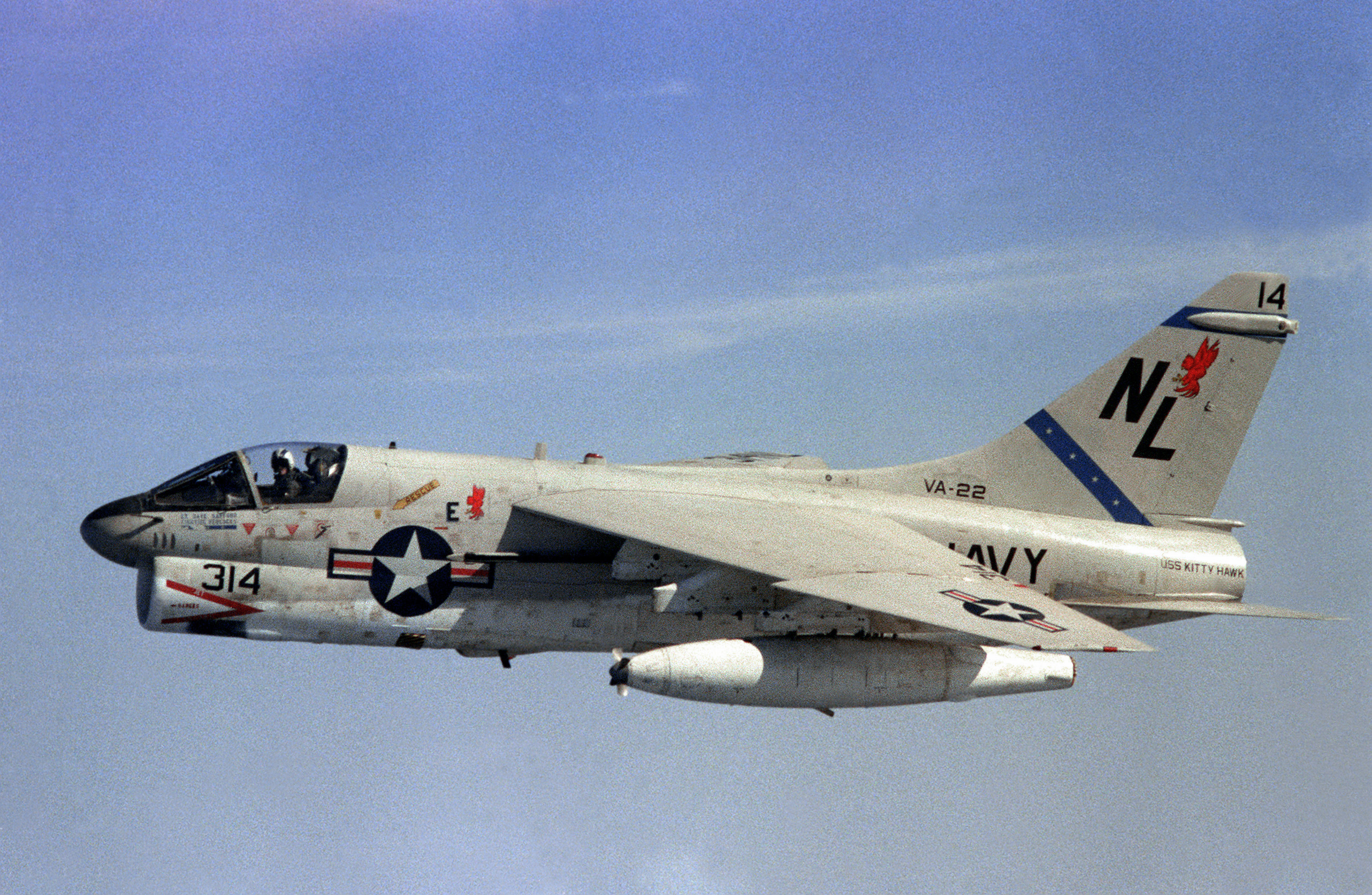
Carrier Air Wing 15 tail code "NL" is prominently displayed on this A-7E Corsair II.

Tail codes on the U.S. Navy aircraft are the markings that help to identify the aircraft's unit and/or base assignment. These codes comprise one or two letters or digits painted on both sides of the vertical stabilizer, on the top right and on the bottom left wings near the tip. Although located both on the vertical stabilizer and the wings from their inception in July 1945, these identification markings are commonly referred as tail codes. Tail codes are meant to identify units and assignments, not individual aircraft. For all aircraft of the U.S. Navy and U.S. Marine Corps unique identification is provided by bureau numbers.

== History ==
The U.S. Navy introduced the identification system of tail and wing letter codes for its aircraft in July 1945. This system was intended to replace the set of geometrical symbols employed for the similar purpose since January 1945. When introduced, tail codes were only given to aircraft carriers. New directives issued in 1946 and in 1948 assigned tail codes to individual Navy and Marine Corps squadrons as well as for carrier air groups. And although the association between particular tail codes and units undergoes changes from time to time, the system as a whole is still in use to present day.

== Basic principles ==
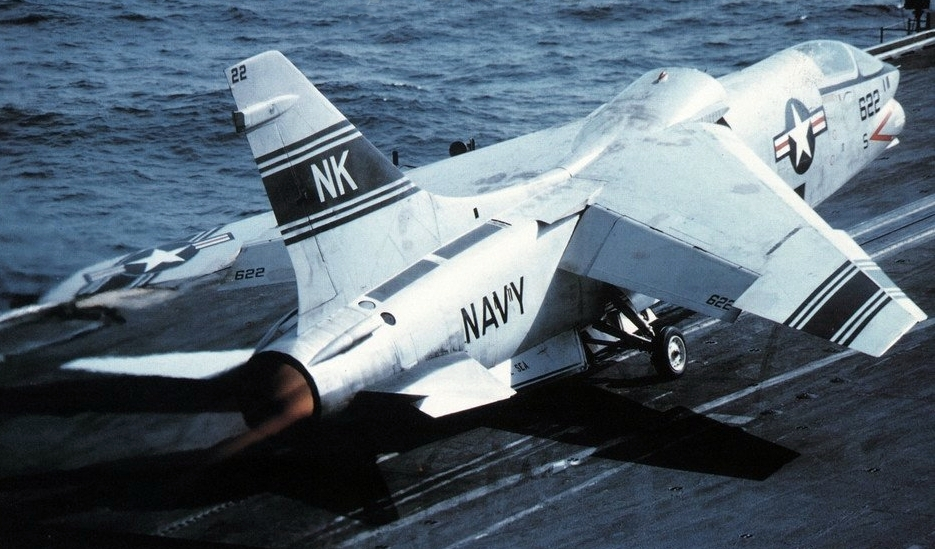
This RF-8G Crusader from VFP-63 Det.2 is deployed with Carrier Air Wing 14 and displays the Air Wing's "NK" tail code.

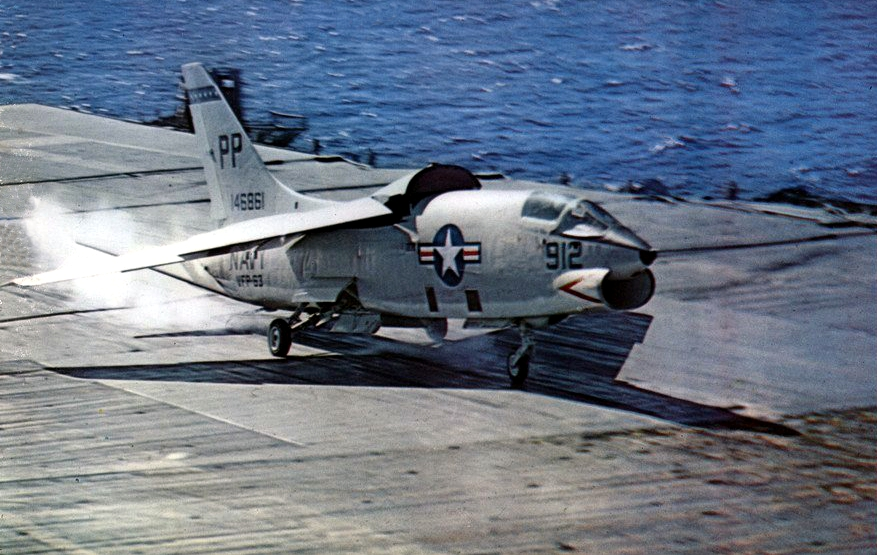
This RF-8A Crusader from VFP-63 Det.B, although deployed with Carrier Air Wing 5, displays the unit's own "PP" tail code and not the Air Wing's "NF".

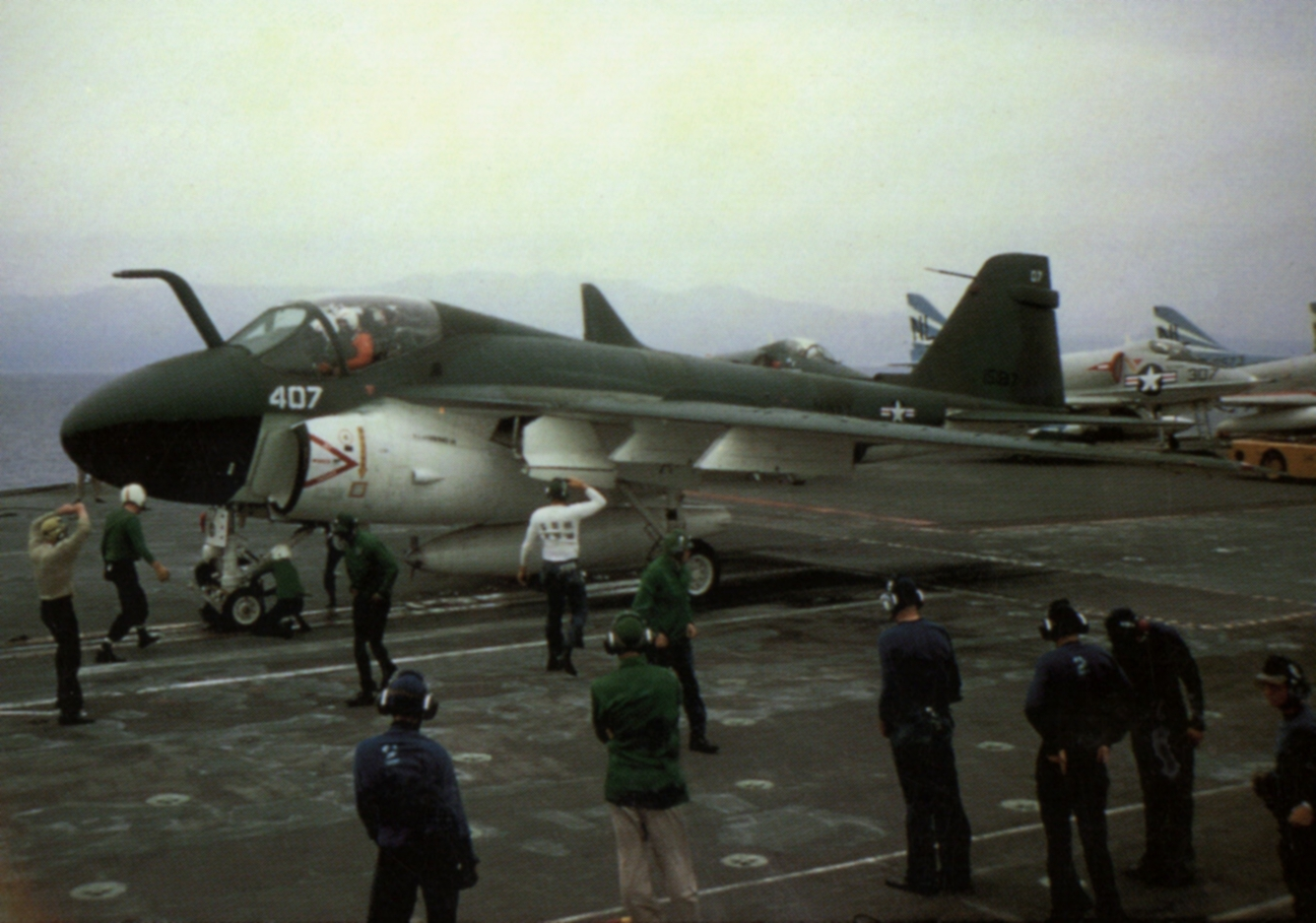
This A-6A Intruder in experimental camouflage paint does not carry the "NL" tail code of its parent Carrier Air Wing 15.

- When introduced in June 1945, tail codes were assigned to individual aircraft carriers. Thus all aircraft based on a particular ship were supposed to carry the ship's code. As of August 1948, tail codes were no longer assigned to aircraft carriers but rather to carrier air groups, which in December 1963 were re-designated as carrier air wings.
- U.S. Navy carrier-based squadrons that deploy as whole units, like fighter and attack squadrons, use their parent carrier air wing tail codes; these types of squadrons are normally not issued individual tail codes.
- Other types of the Navy's carrier-based squadrons that normally send detachments to several carriers, like photo reconnaissance, early warning or electronic attack, have frequently received individual tail codes. When deployed, such squadrons usually adopted the tail code of the parent carrier air wing. However, in recent years the practice of assigning individual tail codes to any of the carrier-capable squadrons seems to have been discontinued.
- Land-based squadrons of the U.S. Navy – e.g., patrol, transport, observation and other support squadrons – are assigned individual tail codes. The same has been applicable in the past to Naval Air Stations.
- Each U.S. Marine Corps squadron, regardless of its mission, is assigned its own tail code. When a carrier-capable Marine squadron deploys on an aircraft carrier as a part of the U.S. Navy Carrier Air Wing, it typically adopts the tail code of this Air Wing for the period of deployment.
- A circular letter issued by the CNO in November 1946 specified that code letters on USMC planes were to be underscored. The underscoring of codes was a short-lived practice abandoned by 1949.
- Throughout the history of tail codes there have been a number of duplicates where the same code was used at the same time by more than one unit. This happened frequently during the first post-war decade when the Navy made several revamps of its tail code assignments within a short time frame. Most typically, duplicates resulted when the same letter was assigned to a regular Air Group and to a reserve facility: for example, in the early 1950s the tail code "A" was valid both for Carrier Air Group 15 aircraft and for all Naval Air Reserve units home-based at NAS Anacostia.
- In certain cases Navy or Marine aircraft do not carry tail codes. This happened with aircraft wearing special or experimental camouflage paint, particularly during the Vietnam War deployments. Aircraft of Marine Helicopter Squadron One (HMX-1) employed for VIP transport are another example.
- The U.S. Navy and the Marine Corps do not seem to have any specific procedure for removing a tail code from use. If a unit that owned a particular tail code is disestablished, the respective tail code becomes extinct. Later, this code may be assigned to a different unit, or it may remain unused.

== List of navy and marine aircraft tail codes ==
A

Assigned to	Assigned on	Notes
USS Cowpens (CVL-25)	July 1945	
USS Antietam (CV-36)	8 January 1946, U.S. Navy Letter FF12-5	
Headquarters Squadron, Marine Air Wing 1	7 November 1946, U.S. Navy Letter ACL 156-46	
CVG-19, Carrier Air Group 19	12 December 1946, U.S. Navy Letter ACL 165-46	
Navy Air Reserve units at NAS Anacostia	November 1946	Code changed to "6A" in 1956.
CVG-14, Carrier Air Group 14	July 1953	Code changed to "NK" in 1956.
TW-1, Training Air Wing 1	August 1971	Comprise VT-7, VT-9.

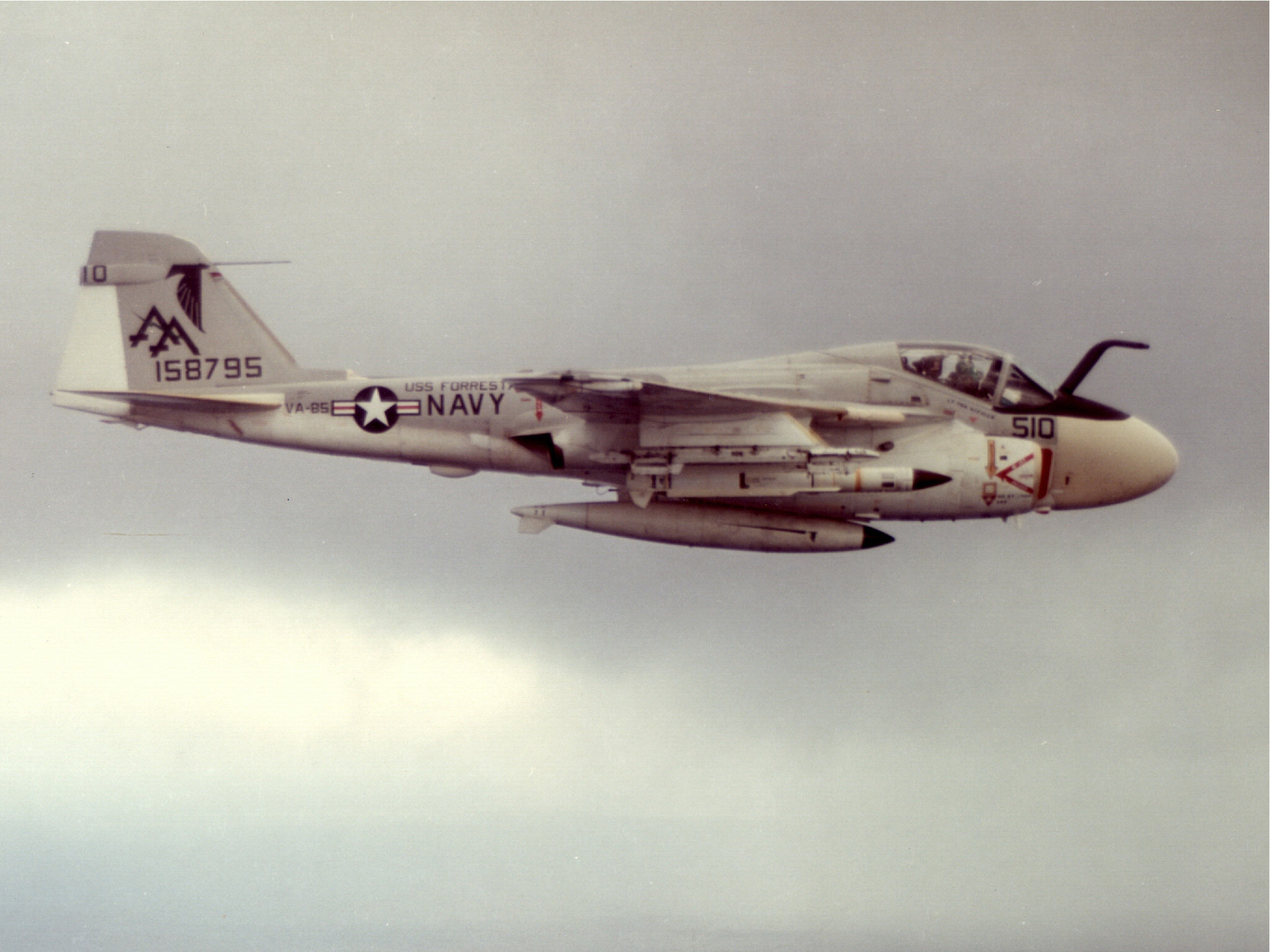
A stylized rendering of Carrier Air Wing 17 "AA" code can be seen on this A-6E Intruder.

AA

Assigned to	Assigned on	Notes
USS Lake Champlain (CV-39)	July 1945	
USS Monterey (CVL-26)	8 January 1946, U.S. Navy Letter FF12-5	
VMO-3	7 November 1946, U.S. Navy Letter ACL 156-46	
VP-MS-11	7 November 1946, U.S. Navy Letter ACL 156-46	Tail code changed to "MA" in August 1948.
CVW-17, Carrier Air Wing 17	Activated in November 1966	Code changed to "NA" in 2012.

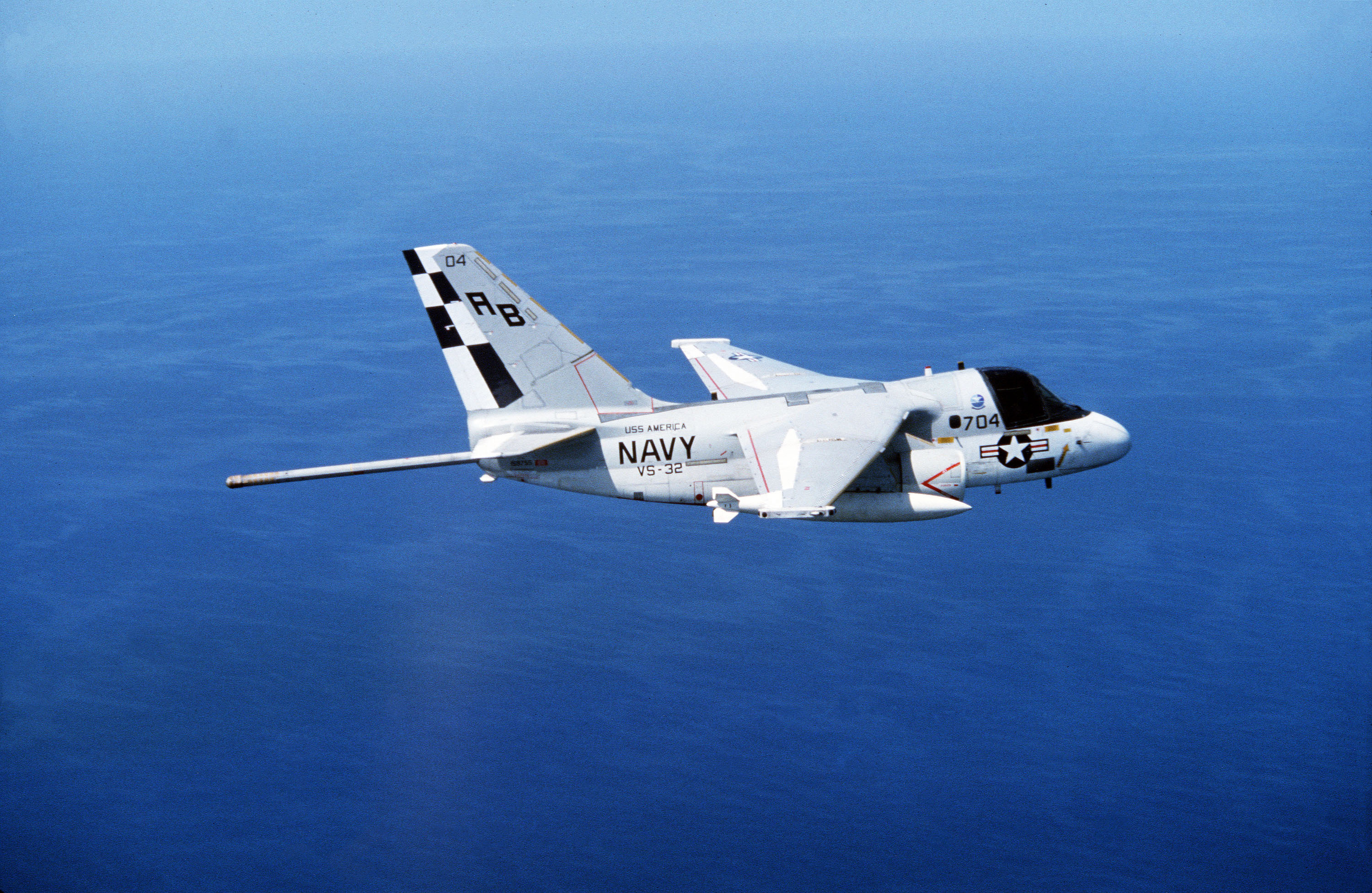
This S-3A Viking from VS-32 shows the "AB" tail code of CVW-1.

AB

Assigned to	Assigned on	Notes
VMO-6	7 November 1946, U.S. Navy Letter ACL 156-46	Tail code changed to "WB" in 1948.
VP-HL-8	7 November 1946, U.S. Navy Letter ACL 156-46	
VMF-452	4 August 1948, U.S. Navy Letter ACL 69-48	Disestablished in December 1949.
CVG-1, Carrier Air Group 1 Re-designated CVW-1, Carrier Air Wing 1	November 1956	

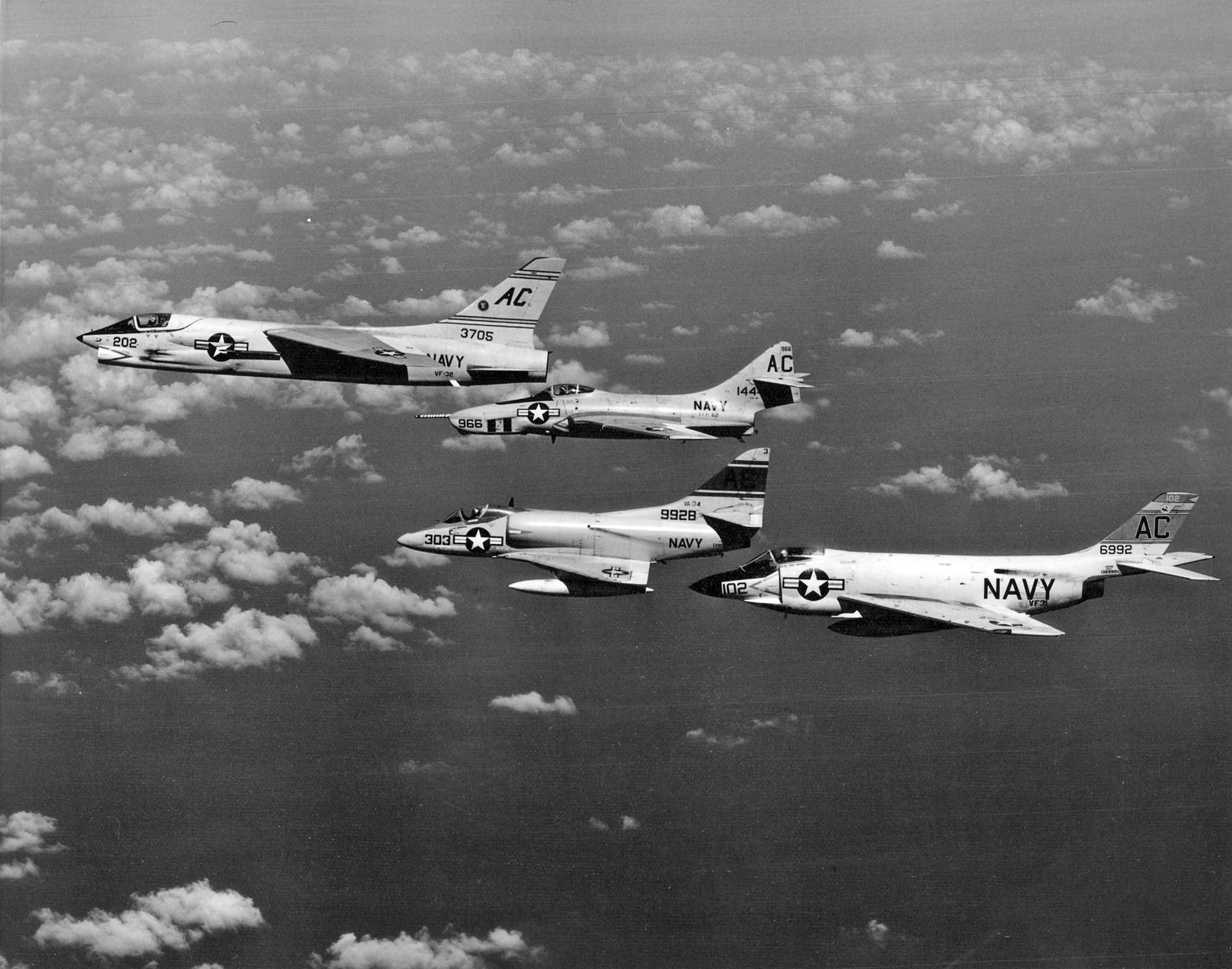
Carrier Air Group 3 planes in flight in 1958.

AC

Assigned to	Assigned on	Notes
VP-ML-1 Re-designated VP-1	November 1946	
VMR-153	4 August 1948, U.S. Navy Letter ACL 69-48	
CVG-3, Carrier Air Group 3 Re-designated CVW-3, Carrier Air Wing 3	1957	

AD

Assigned to	Assigned on	Notes
HEDRON-1, Headquarters Squadron, Marine Air Group 1	7 November 1946, U.S. Navy Letter ACL 156-46	
VMR-253	Circa 1946	Tail code changed to "QD" in 1958.
VMF-322 Re-designated VMA-322	4 August 1948, U.S. Navy Letter ACL 69-48	Disestablished in November 1949.
RCVG-4 Replacement Carrier Air Group 4 Re-designated RCVW-4, Readiness Carrier Air Wing 4	April 1958	Disestablished in July 1970. AD tail code retained by VAW-120, VFA-106, VA-42, VA-43, VA-45, VA-174, VF-101, VS-27.

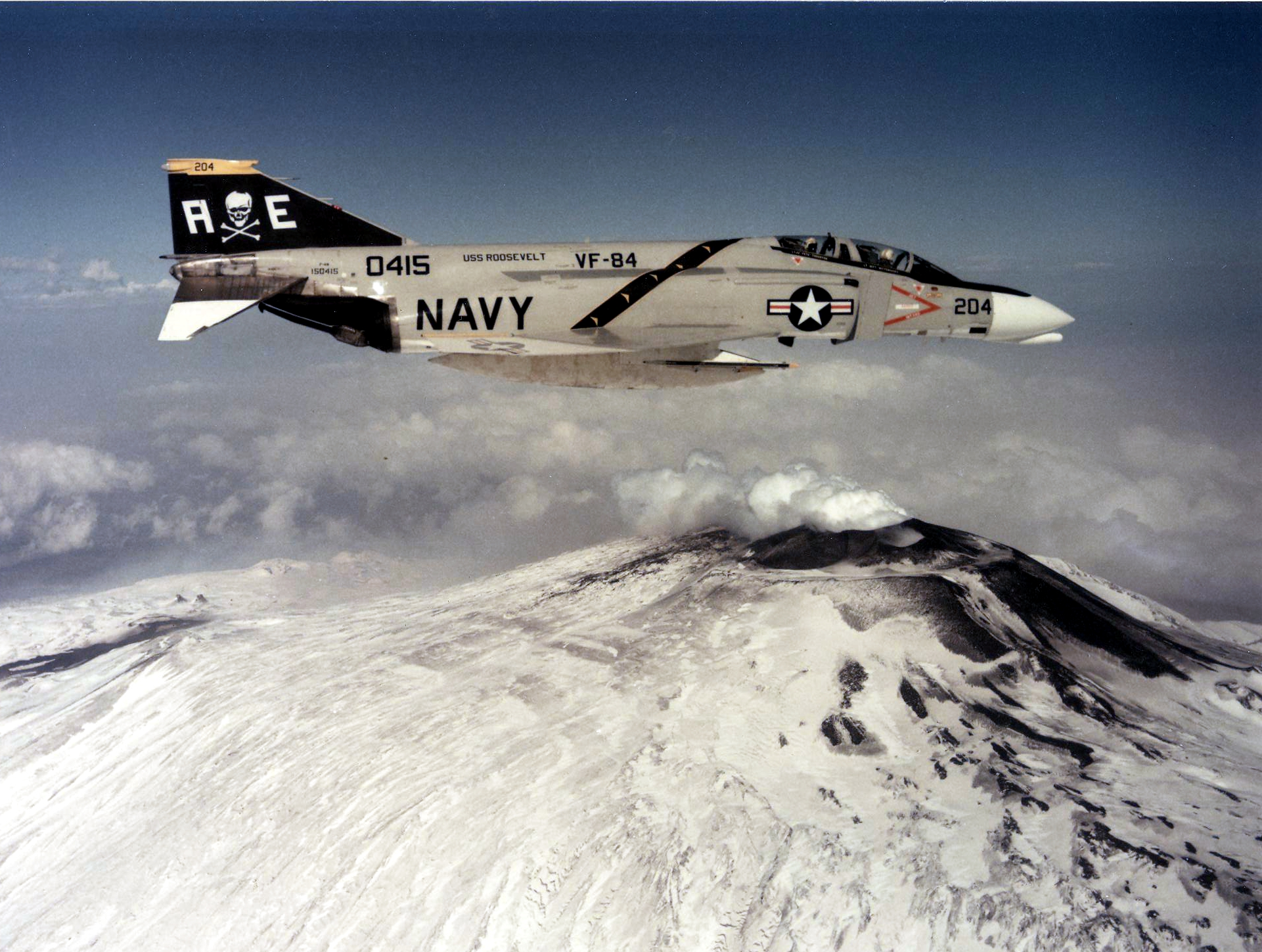
Carrier Air Wing 6 tail code is seen on this VF-84 Phantom II in 1975.

AE

Assigned to	Assigned on	Notes
VMF-115	7 November 1946, U.S. Navy Letter ACL 156-46	
CVW-6, Carrier Air Wing 6	December 1963	Disestablished in April 1993.

AF

Assigned to	Assigned on	Notes
VMF-211 Re-designated VMA-211	7 November 1946, U.S. Navy Letter ACL 156-46	
Fighter units of Navy Air Reserve at NAS Anacostia	November 1946	A very short-lived assignment.
CVG-6, Carrier Air Group 6	November 1956	Re-designated Carrier Air Wing 6 in 1963 and received a new tail code "AE".
CVWR-20, Reserve Carrier Air Wing 20	April 1970	Renamed Tactical Support Wing (TSW) in April 2007. The "AF" tail code is retained by squadrons assigned to TSW.

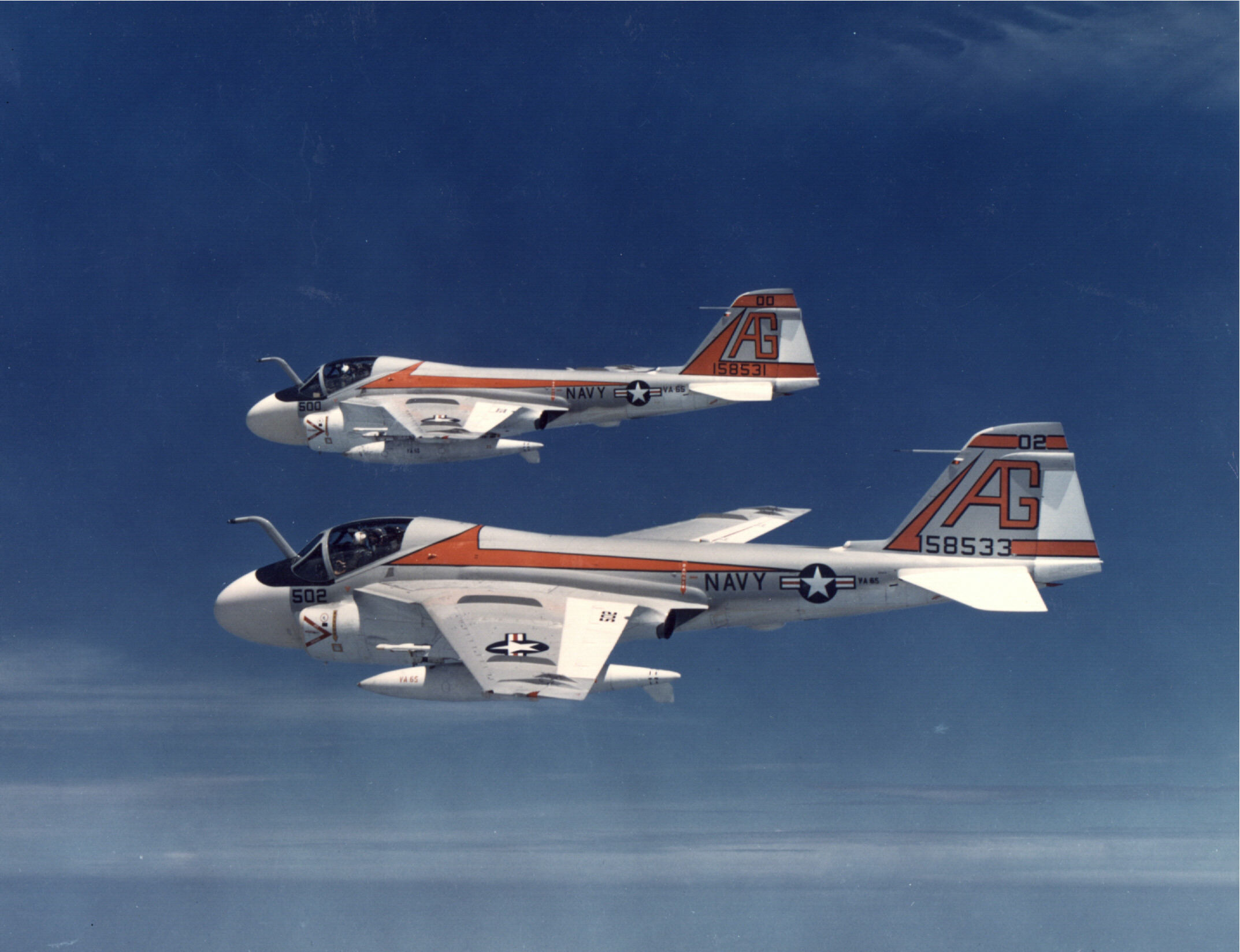
A-6E Intruders of VA-62 carry the Carrier Air Wing 7 "AG" code.

AG

Assigned to	Assigned on	Notes
CVG-7, Carrier Air Group 7 Re-designated CVW-7, Carrier Air Wing 7	November 1956	

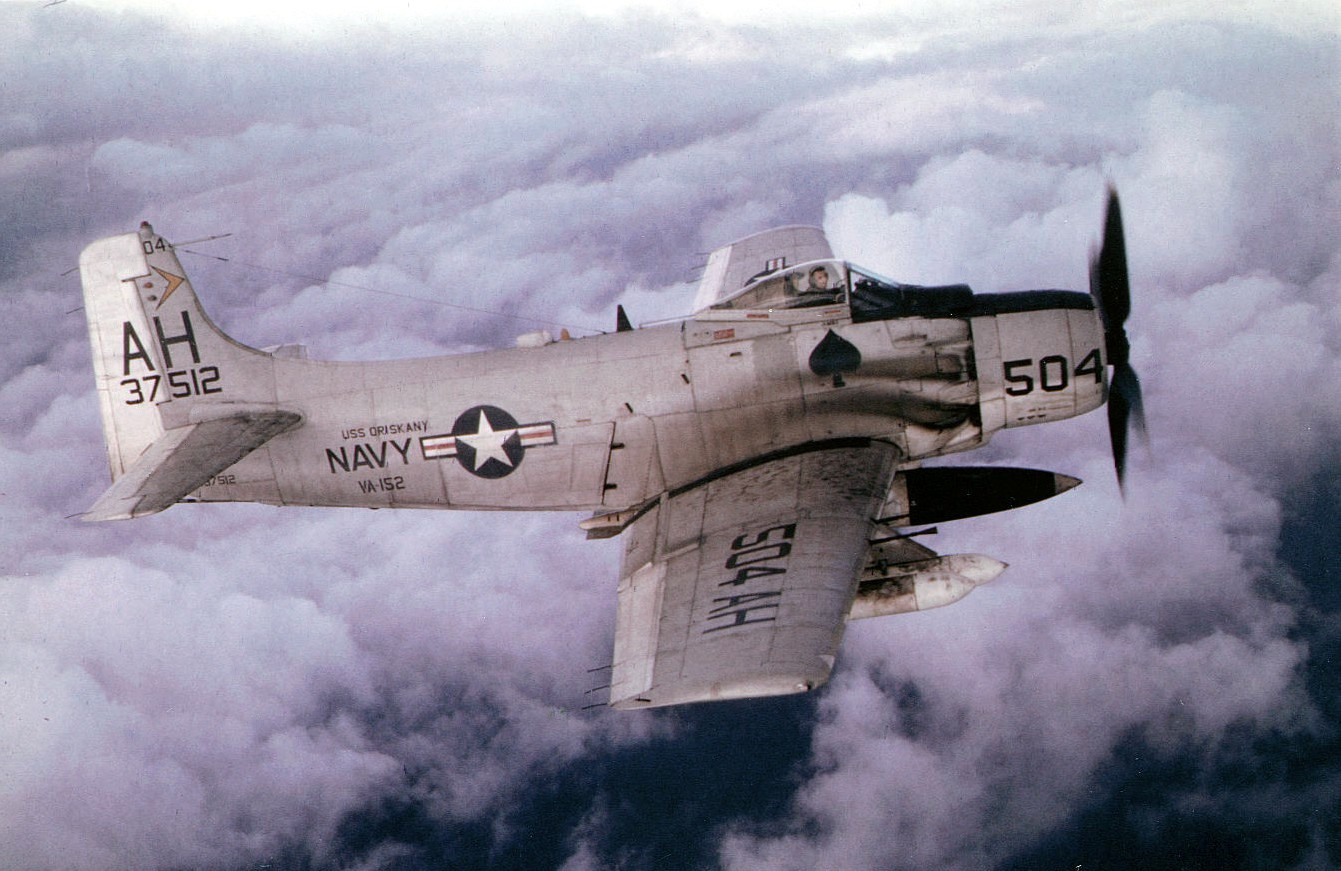
VA-152 A-1H Skyraider carries CVW-16 tail code.

AH

Assigned to	Assigned on	Notes
VMF-218	7 November 1946, U.S. Navy Letter ACL 156-46	Disestablished on 31 December 1949.
CVG-16, Carrier Air Group 16 Re-designated CVW-16, Carrier Air Wing 16	September 1960	Disestablished.

AI

Assigned to	Assigned on	Notes
VMF(N)-533 Re-designated VMF-533	7 November 1946, U.S. Navy Letter ACL 156-46	

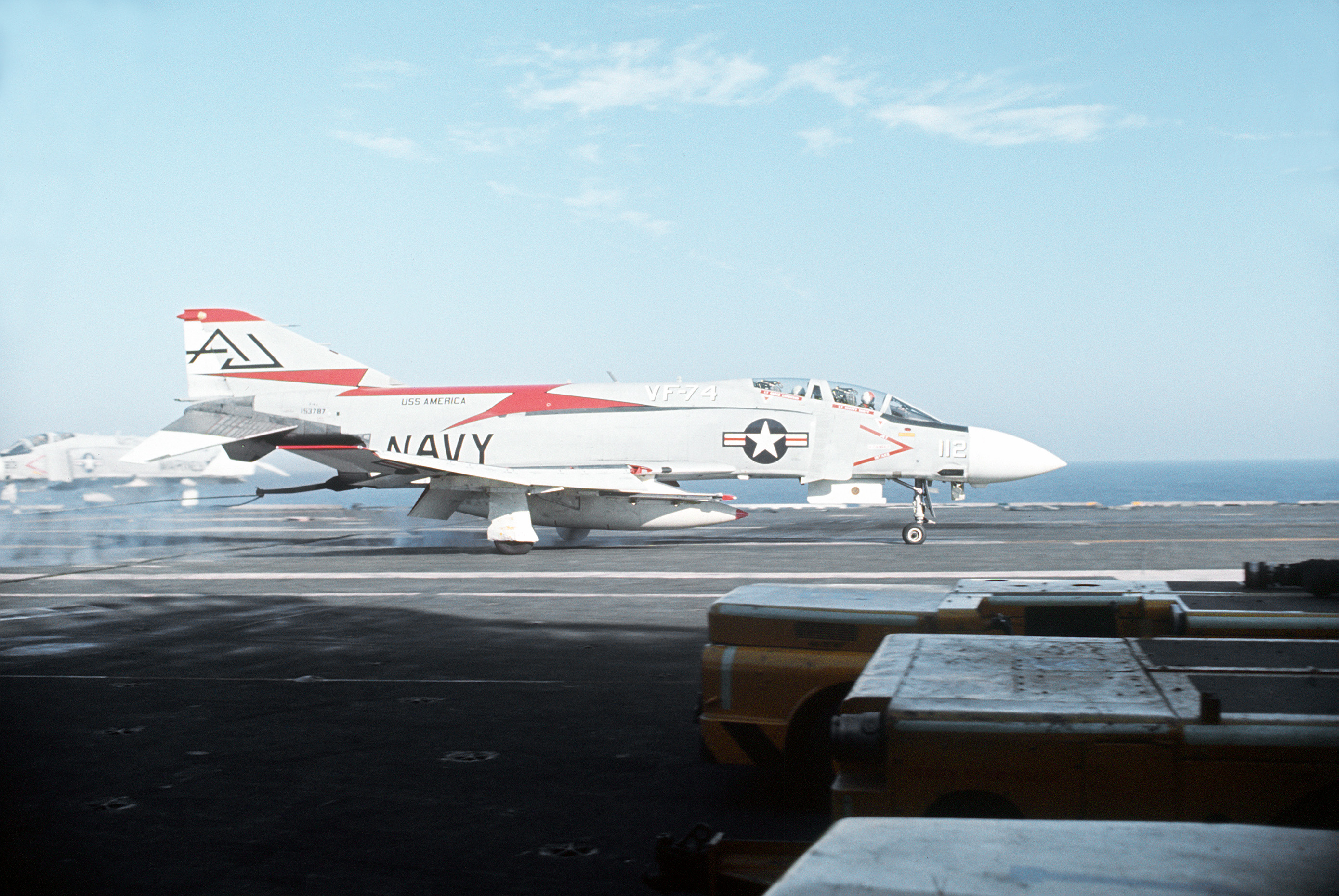
This F-4J Phantom II is part of Carrier Air Wing 8 and displays the Wing's "AJ" tail code.

AJ

Assigned to	Assigned on	Notes
CVG-8, Carrier Air Group 8 Re-designated CVW-8, Carrier Air Wing 8	November 1956	

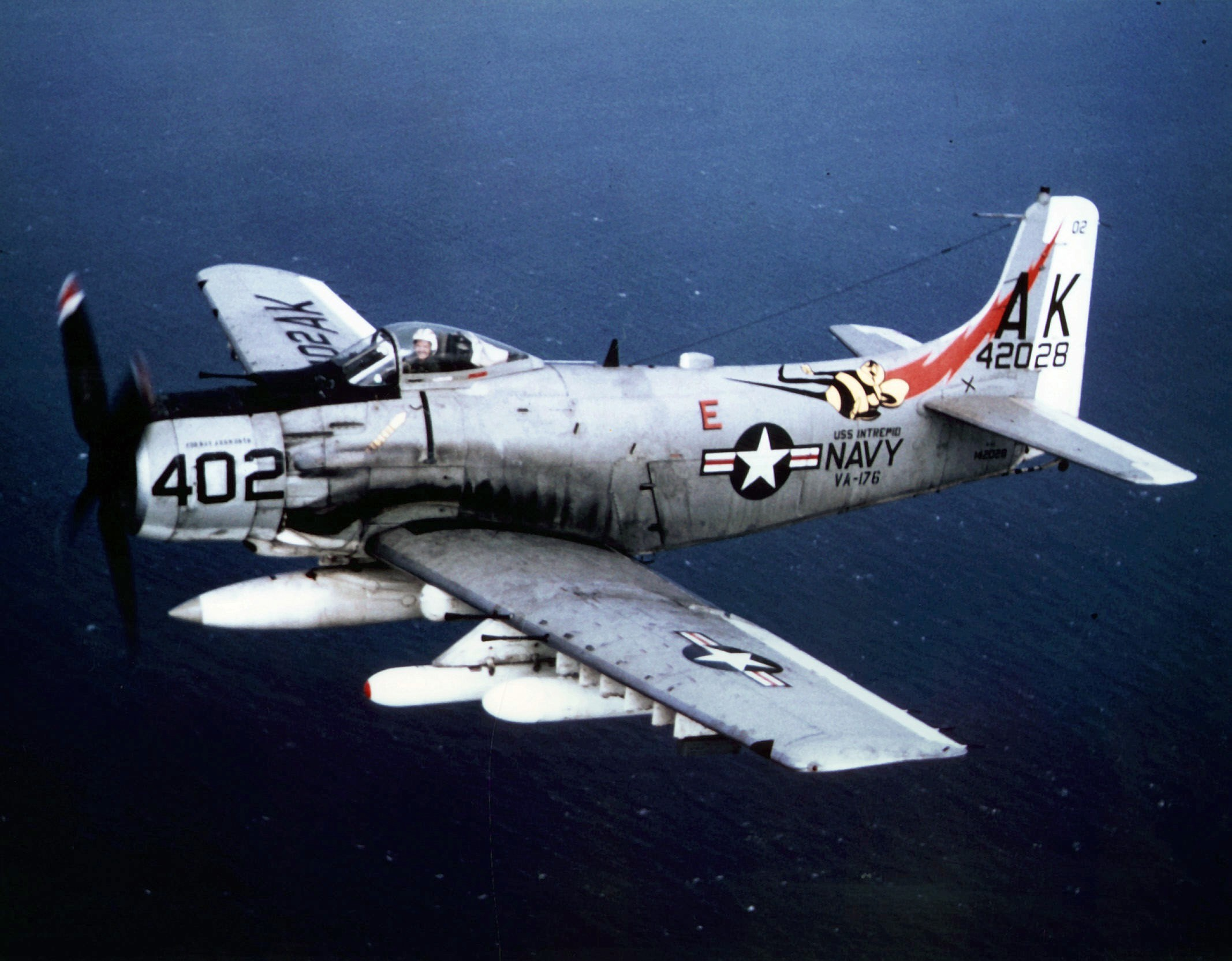
CVW-13 code is seen on this VA-176 A-1J Skyraider.

AK

Assigned to	Assigned on	Notes
VMA-121	29 July 1950, U.S. Navy Letter ACL 43-50	
CVG-10, Carrier Air Group 10	November 1956	
CVG-13, Carrier Air Group 13	August 1961	Inactivated in October 1962.
CVW-13, Carrier Air Wing 13	March 1984	Inactivated in January 1991.

AL

Assigned to	Assigned on	Notes
VMA-251	29 July 1950, U.S. Navy Letter ACL 43-50	
CVG-17, Carrier Air Group 17	Circa 1957	Disestablished in September 1958.

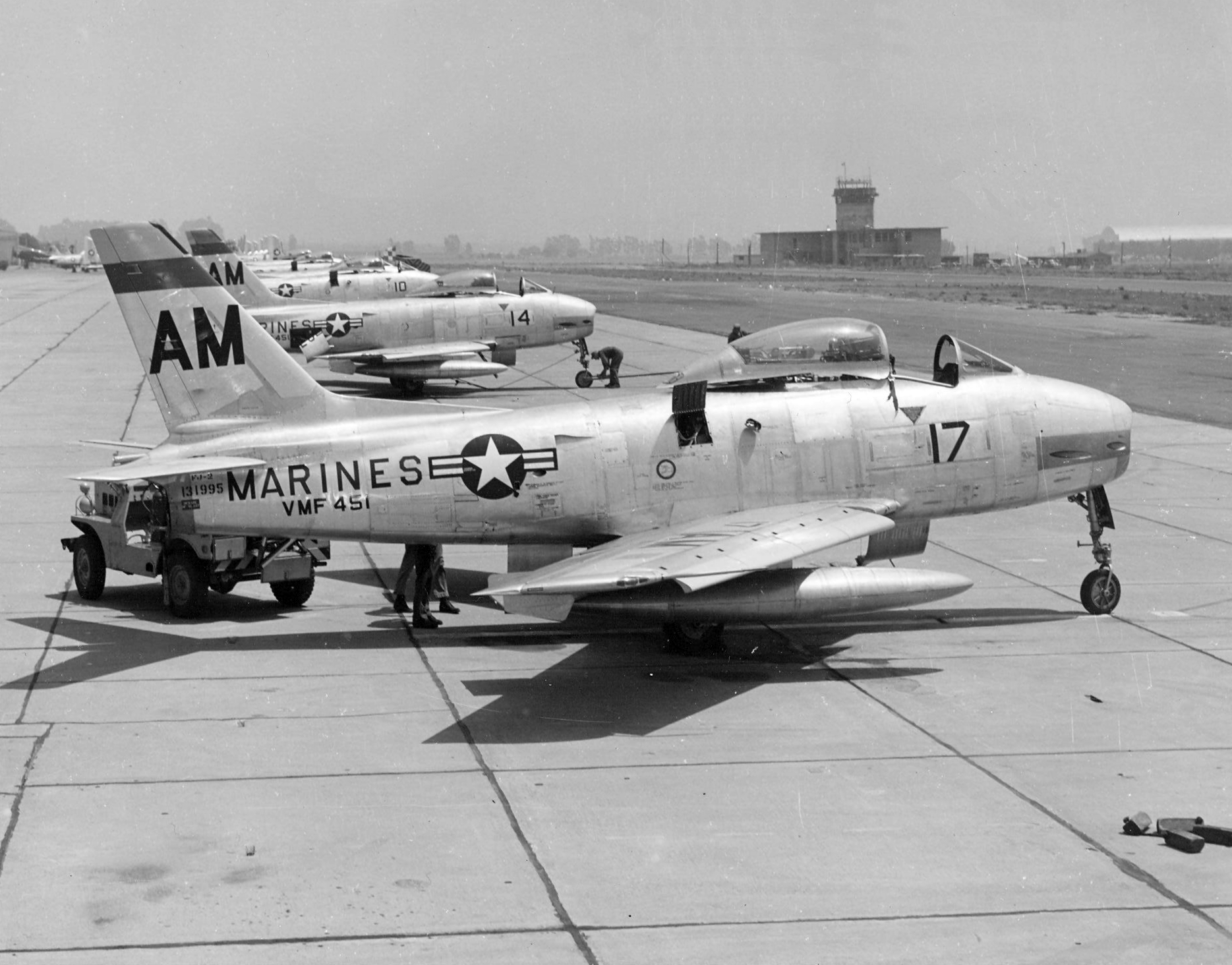
FJ-2 Furies of VMF-451 in 1954.

AM

Assigned to	Assigned on	Notes
VMF-451	Circa 1951	
ATG-181, Air Task Group 181	November 1956	Inactivated in 1958.
HSC-22	29 September 2006	

AN

Assigned to	Assigned on	Notes
HATU, Heavy Attack Training Unit	February 1953	
ATG-182, Air Task Group 182	November 1956	Inactivated in 1959.

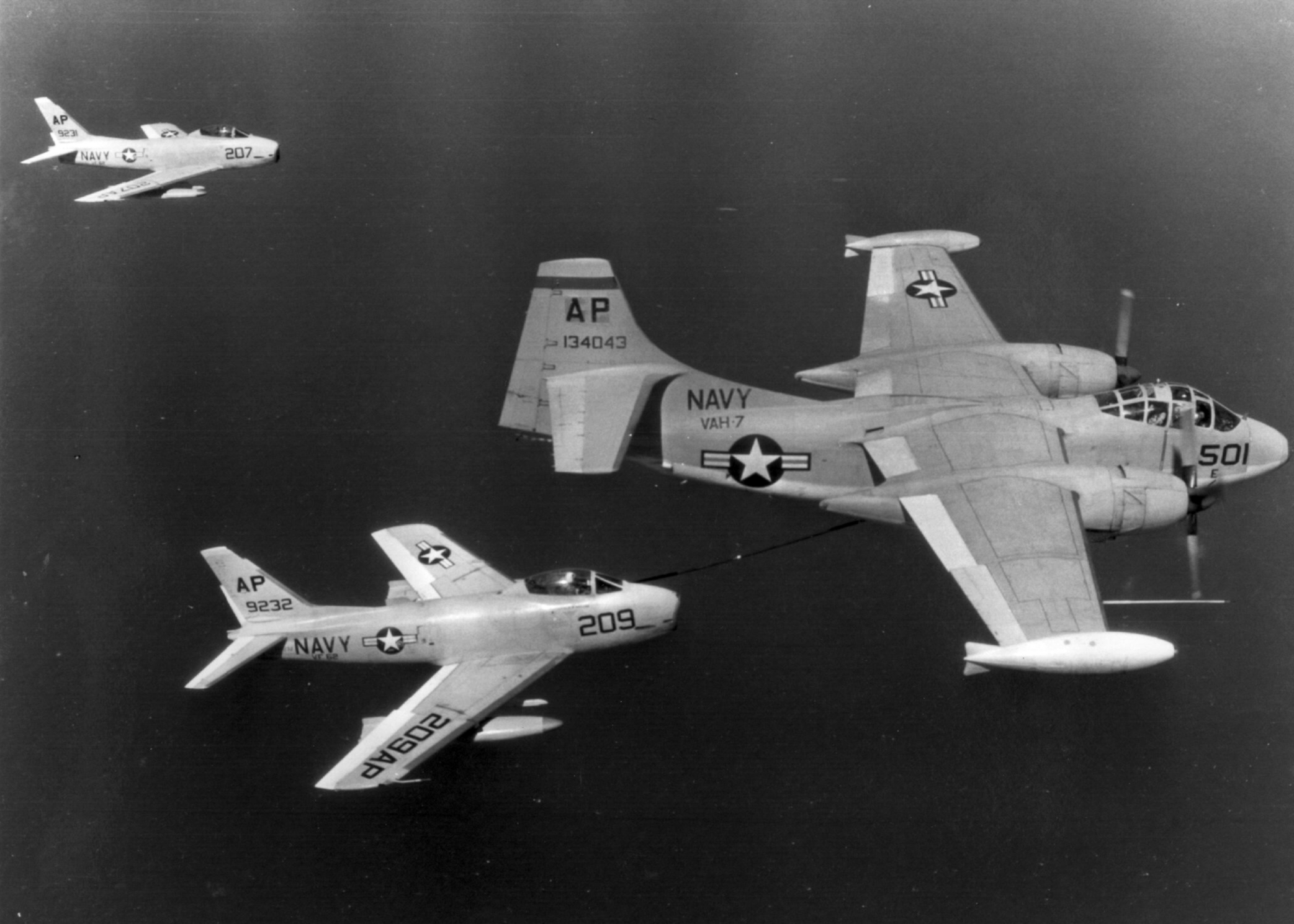
Aircraft of Air Task Group 201 in flight in 1958.

AP

Assigned to	Assigned on	Notes
ATG-201, Air Task Group 201	November 1956	Inactivated in 1958.

AQ

Assigned to	Assigned on	Notes
ATG-202, Air Task Group 202	November 1956	Inactivated in 1959.

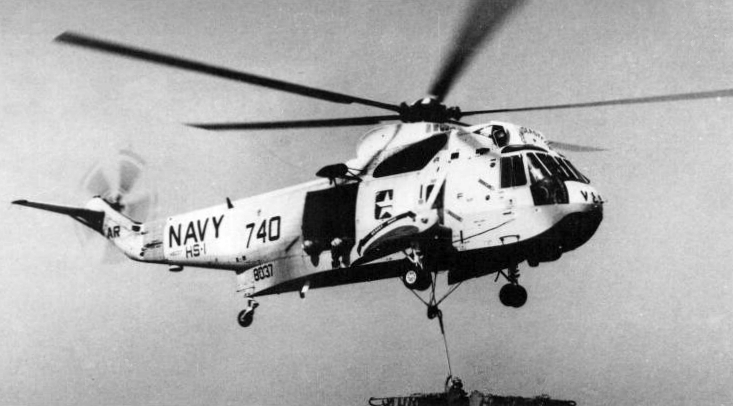
"AR" tail code can be seen on this SH-3G Sea King of HS-1.

AR

Assigned to	Assigned on	Notes
RCVG-50, Replacement Carrier Antisubmarine Warfare Air Group 50	1960	Disestablished in June 1970. RCVG-50 tail code retained by HS-1 and VS-30.
HS-1	June 1970	Disestablished in May 1997.
VS-30	June 1970	Disestablished December 2005.

AS

Assigned to	Assigned on	Notes
CVGS-52, Carrier Antisubmarine Warfare Air Group 52	June 1960	Comprised squadrons VS-28, VS-31 and HS-11. Disestablished in December 1969.

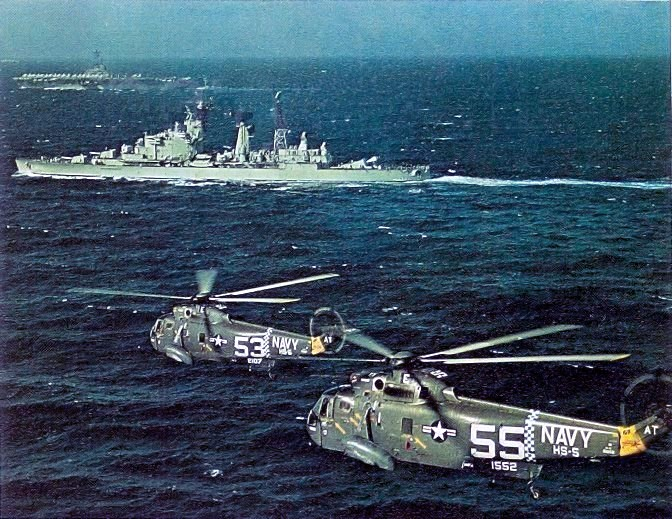
SH-3A Sea King helicopters carry the "AT" code of CVGS-54.

AT

Assigned to	Assigned on	Notes
HEDRON-20, Headquarters Squadron Marine Air Group 20	December 1951	
CVGS-54, Carrier Antisubmarine Warfare Air Group 54	1960	Comprised squadrons VS-22, VS-32 and HS-5. Disestablished in July 1972.

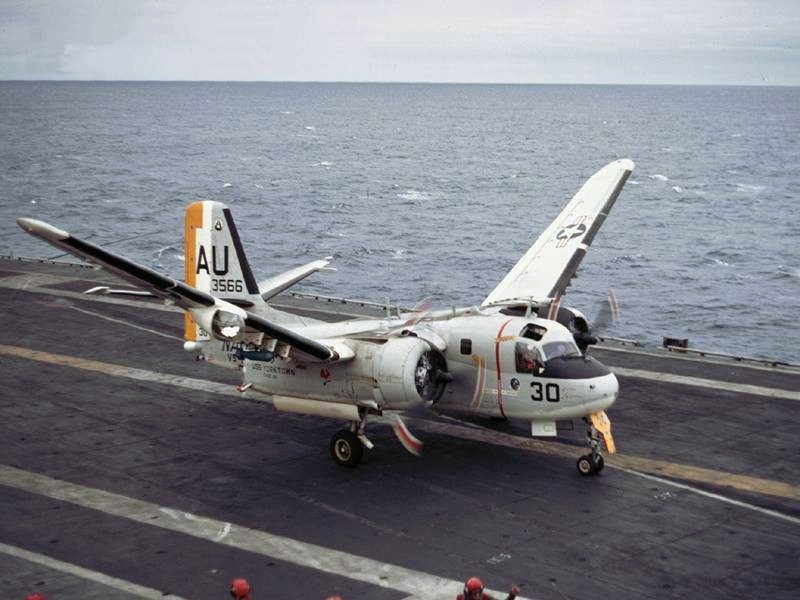
This S-2E Tracker shows the "AU" code of its parent CVGS-56.

AU

Assigned to	Assigned on	Notes
HEDRON-13, Headquarters Squadron Marine Air Group 13	March 1951	
CVGS-56, Carrier Antisubmarine Warfare Air Group 56	1960	Comprised squadrons VS-24, VS-27 and HS-3. Disestablished in June 1973.

AV

Assigned to	Assigned on	Notes
HEDRON-15, Headquarters Squadron Marine Air Group 15	4 August 1948, U.S. Navy Letter ACL 69-48	
CVGS-58, Carrier Antisubmarine Warfare Air Group 58	June 1960	Comprised squadrons VS-26, VS-36 and HS-7. Disestablished in March 1966.

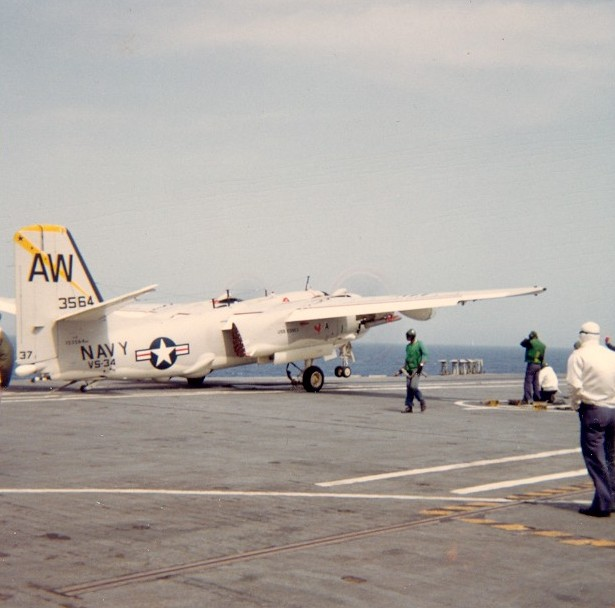
"AW" code of CVGS-60 can be seen on this S-2E Tracker.

AW

Assigned to	Assigned on	Notes
HEDRON-24, Headquarters Squadron Marine Air Group 24	4 August 1948, U.S. Navy Letter ACL 69-48	
CVGS-60, Carrier Antisubmarine Warfare Air Group 60	May 1960	Comprised squadrons VS-34, VS-39 and HS-9. Disestablished in October 1968.
CVSR-70, Reserve Carrier Antisubmarine Warfare Air Group 70	1970	

AX

Assigned to	Assigned on	Notes
HEDRON-25, Headquarters Squadron Marine Air Group 25	1952	
CVGS-62, Carrier Antisubmarine Warfare Air Group 62	September 1961	Comprised squadrons VS-20, VS-42 and HS-13. Disestablished in 1962.
VR-53	2004	

AZ

Assigned to	Assigned on	Notes
HEDRON-1, Headquarters Squadron Marine Air Group 1	4 August 1948, U.S. Navy Letter ACL 69-48	

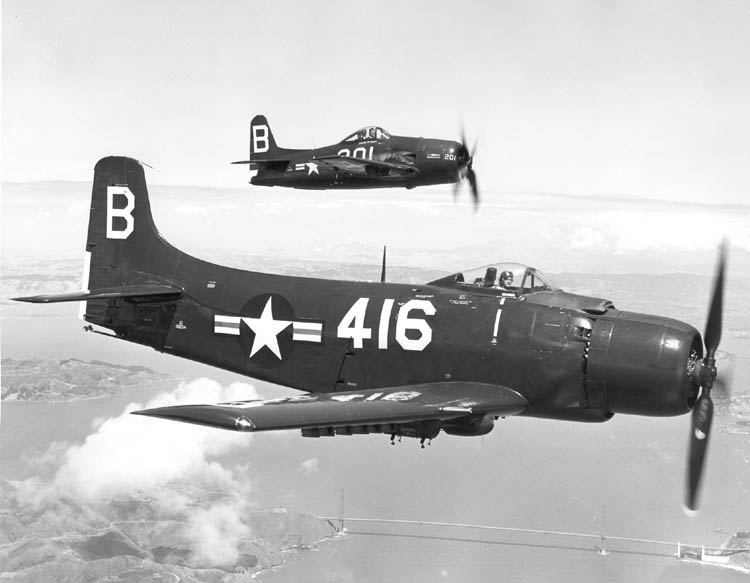
Tail codes on these planes denote assignment to the USS Boxer.

B

Assigned to	Assigned on	Notes
USS San Jacinto (CVL-30)	July 1945	
USS Boxer (CV-21)	8 January 1946, U.S. Navy Letter FF12-5	
Headquarters Squadron Marine Air Wing 2	7 November 1946, U.S. Navy Letter ACL 156-46	
CVG-15, Carrier Air Group 15	12 December 1946, U.S. Navy Letter ACL 165-46	
Navy Air Reserve units at NAS Atlanta	November 1946	The "C" code issued to this NAS was a controlled duplicate of the same code letter given to Carrier Air Group 15. Code changed to "7B" in 1956.
CVG-19, Carrier Air Group 19	July 1953	Tail code changed to "NM" in November 1956.
TW-2, Training Air Wing 2		Comprise VT-21, VT-22.

BA

Assigned to	Assigned on	Notes
USS Bairoko (CVE-115)	7 November 1946, U.S. Navy Letter ACL 156-46	
VO-1B	7 November 1946, U.S. Navy Letter ACL 156-46	
VP-MS-7 Re-designated VP-47	7 November 1946, U.S. Navy Letter ACL 156-46	Tail code changed to "RD" in 1957.
HEDRON-11, Headquarters Squadron Marine Air Group 11	7 November 1946, U.S. Navy Letter ACL 156-46	
Attack units of Navy Air Reserve at NAS Atlanta	November 1946	A very short-lived assignment.
Blue Angels flight demonstration squadron	Unknown	This assignment is probably a purely bureaucratic one as no Blue Angels aircraft has ever carried tail codes.

BB

Assigned to	Assigned on	Notes
USS Ranger (CV-4)	8 January 1946, U.S. Navy Letter FF12-5	The USS Ranger was decommissioned on 18 October 1946.
VO-2B	7 November 1946, U.S. Navy Letter ACL 156-46	
VP-HL-13 Re-designated VP-25	7 November 1946, U.S. Navy Letter ACL 156-46	Disestablished in January 1950.
HEDRON-14, Headquarters Squadron Marine Air Group 14	7 November 1946, U.S. Navy Letter ACL 156-46	

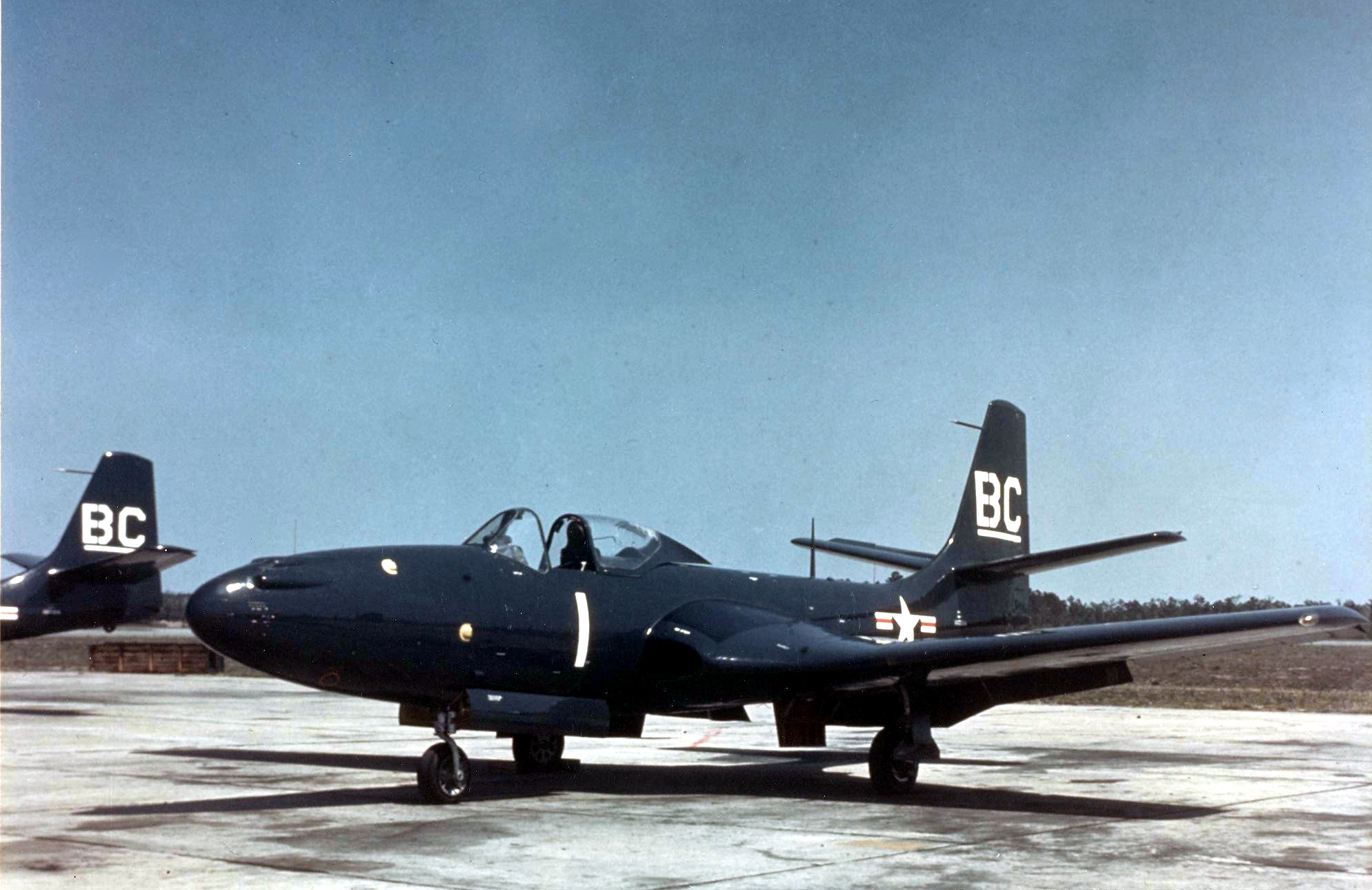
An example of underscored tail code is seen on this FH-1 Phantom belonging to VMF-122.

BC

Assigned to	Assigned on	Notes
VP-HL-3	7 November 1946, U.S. Navy Letter ACL 156-46	Disestablished in May 1947.
VMF-122	7 November 1946, U.S. Navy Letter ACL 156-46	Tail code changed to "LC".
VP-MS-3 Re-designayed VP-43	August 1948	Disestablished in March 1949.
VMR-153	1957	Disestablished in 1959.

BD

Assigned to	Assigned on	Notes
VP-HL-5	7 November 1946, U.S. Navy Letter ACL 156-46	Disestablished in May 1947.
VMF-212	7 November 1946, U.S. Navy Letter ACL 156-46	
VP-MS-6 Re-designated VP-46	4 August 1948, U.S. Navy Letter ACL 69-48	Tail code changed to "RC" in 1957.
VR-64		

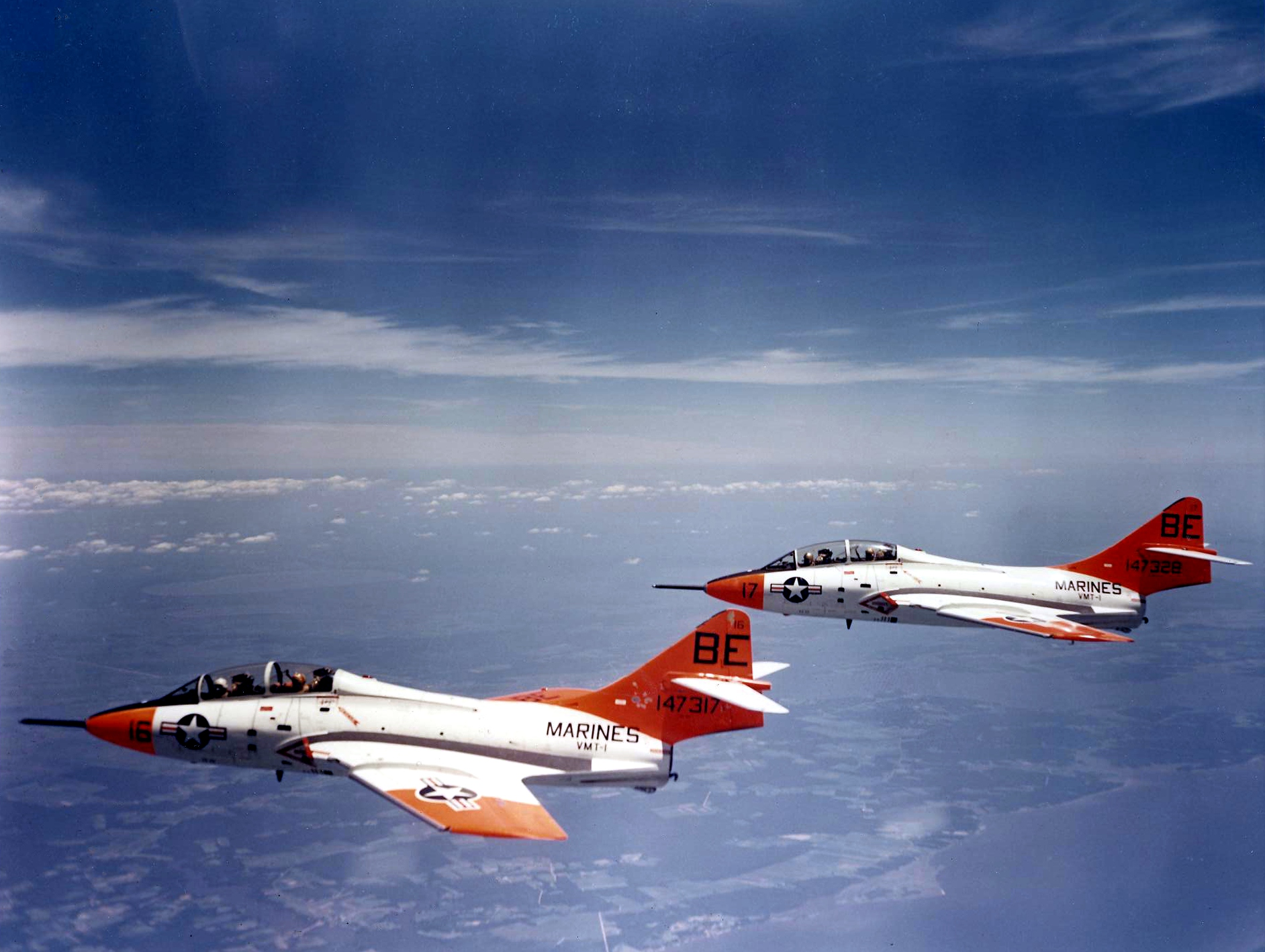
Cougar jet trainers carry the tail code of VMT-1.

BE

Assigned to	Assigned on	Notes
VP-ML-6 Re-designated VP-6	7 November 1946, U.S. Navy Letter ACL 156-46	Tail code changed to "PC" in 1957.
VMF-222	7 November 1946, U.S. Navy Letter ACL 156-46	Disestablished in December 1949.
VMIT-20	1957	Disestablished in June 1958.
VMT-1	July 1958	In May 1972 the squadron was re-designated VMAT-203 with its tail code changed to "KD".

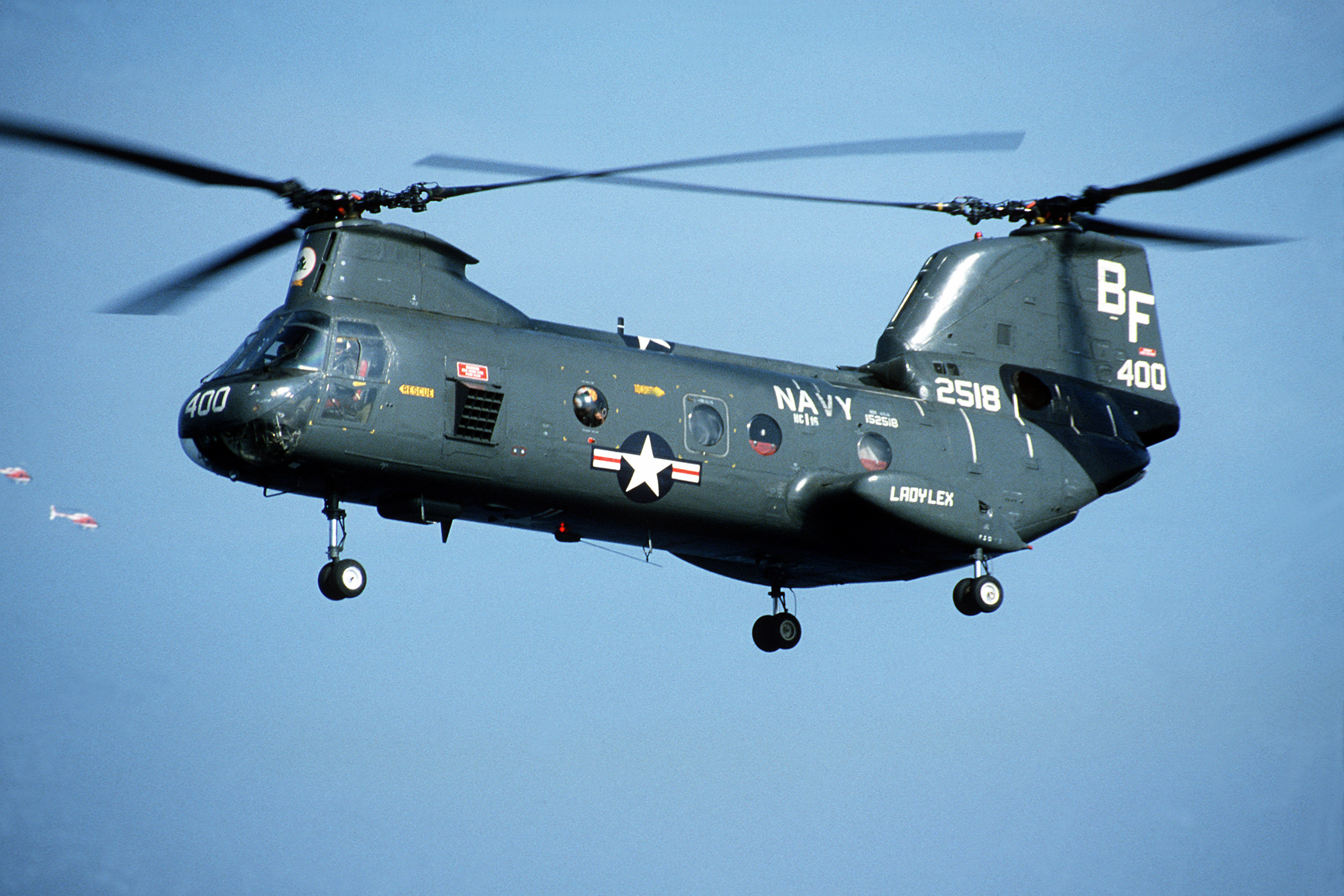
A Sea Knight helicopter of HC-16 in 1984.

BF

Assigned to	Assigned on	Notes
HEDRON-21, Headquarters Squadron Marine Air Group 21	7 November 1946, U.S. Navy Letter ACL 156-46	
Fighter units of Navy Air Reserve at NAS Atlanta	November 1946	A very short-lived assignment.
VP-812 Re-designated VP-29	July 1950	Disestablished in November 1955.
VAH-2	November 1955	Code changed to "ZA" in 1957.
VMFT-20	1957	Disestablished in June 1958.
HC-16		

BG

Assigned to	Assigned on	Notes
VP-43	4 August 1948, U.S. Navy Letter ACL 69-48	

BH

Assigned to	Assigned on	Notes
VMF-252	7 November 1946, U.S. Navy Letter ACL 156-46	
VP-772 Subsequently, re-designated VP-17 and VA(HM)-10	September 1950	Tail code changed to "ZE" in 1957.
VMR-252 Re-designated VMGR-252	1957	
VX-30	May 1995	

BI

Assigned to	Assigned on	Notes
VMR-952	7 November 1946, U.S. Navy Letter ACL 156-46	
VP-57	February 1953	Disestablished in July 1956.
VAH-4	July 1956	Code changed to "ZB" in 1957.

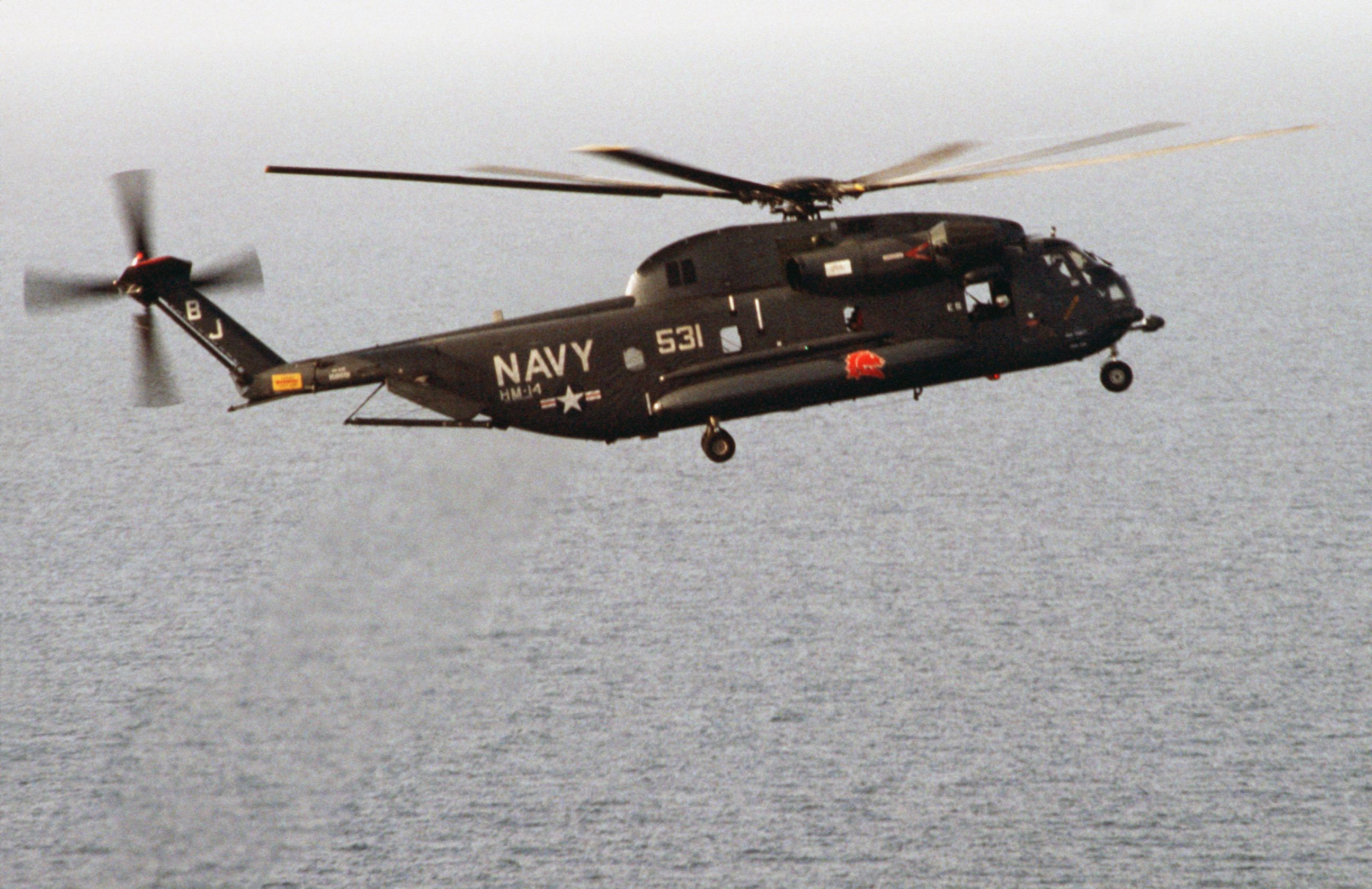
An HM-14 RH-53D in flight.

BJ

Assigned to	Assigned on	Notes
HM-14	May 1978	Disestablished 2023

BK

Assigned to	Assigned on	Notes
HEDRON-22, Headquarters Squadron Marine Air Group 22	7 November 1946, U.S. Navy Letter ACL 156-46	

BL

Assigned to	Assigned on	Notes
VMF-113	7 November 1946, U.S. Navy Letter ACL 156-46	Disestablished in April 1947.
HML-268	September 1972	Disestablished in 1977.

BM

Assigned to	Assigned on	Notes
VMF-314	7 November 1946, U.S. Navy Letter ACL 156-46	Disestablished in April 1947.
H&MS-35, Headquarters and Maintenance Squadron 35	1957	Disestablished in June 1958.

BP

Assigned to	Assigned on	Notes
Patrol units of Navy Air Reserve at NAS Atlanta	Circa 1947	A very short-lived assignment.
VMFT(AW)-20	1957	

BR

Assigned to	Assigned on	Notes
VMO-1	7 November 1946, U.S. Navy Letter ACL 156-46	Code changed to "LR" in 1948.
HC-8		
HSC-28		

BS

Assigned to	Assigned on	Notes
USS Badoeng Strait (CVE-116)	7 November 1946, U.S. Navy Letter ACL 156-46	
HEDRON-53, Headquarters Squadron Marine Air Group 53	7 November 1946, U.S. Navy Letter ACL 156-46	
CVEG-1, Escort Carrier Air Group 1	12 December 1946, U.S. Navy Letter ACL 165-46	
VC-21 Re-designated VS-21	4 August 1948, U.S. Navy Letter ACL 69-48	Disestablished in February 2005.

BT

Assigned to	Assigned on	Notes
VMF-531	7 November 1946, U.S. Navy Letter ACL 156-46	
H&MS-20, Headquarters and Maintenance Squadron 20	1957	Disestablished in 1958.

BU

Assigned to	Assigned on	Notes
VMF-532	7 November 1946, U.S. Navy Letter ACL 156-46	

BV

Assigned to	Assigned on	Notes
VMF-534	7 November 1946, U.S. Navy Letter ACL 156-46	

BW

Assigned to	Assigned on	Notes
VAH-3	June 1956	Code changed to "GJ" in 1958.

BY

Assigned to	Assigned on	Notes
VMAT-20	1957	Disestablished in June 1958.

BZ

Assigned to	Assigned on	Notes
AIRFMFLANT, Headquarters Squadron Aircraft Fleet Marine Force Atlantic	1957	Disestablished.

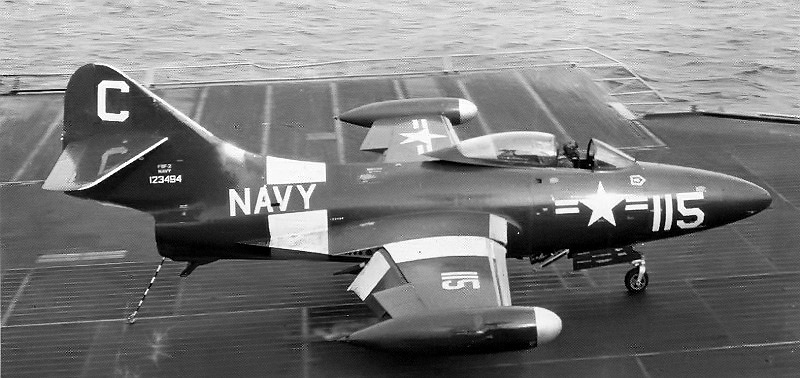
"C" code on this F9F-2 Panther jet denotes assignment to Carrier Air Group 6.

C

Assigned to	Assigned on	Notes
USS Monterey (CVL-26)	July 1945	
USS Coral Sea (CV-43)	8 January 1946, U.S. Navy Letter FF12-5	Assignment remained on paper only as USS Coral Sea was not commissioned until 1 October 1947.
CVBG-5, Battle Carrier Air Group 5	12 December 1946, U.S. Navy Letter ACL 165-46	
Navy Air Reserve units at NAS Columbus	November 1946	The "C" code issued to this NAS was a controlled duplicate of the same code letter given to Carrier Air Group 5. Code changed to "7C" in 1956.
CVG-6, Carrier Air Group 6Carrier Air Group 6	1952	Tail code changed to "AF" in November 1956.
TW-3, Training Air Wing 3		Disestablished in August 1992.

CA

Assigned to	Assigned on	Notes
VO-1C	7 November 1946, U.S. Navy Letter ACL 156-46	
VP-MS-10 Re-designated VP-40	7 November 1946, U.S. Navy Letter ACL 156-46	Tail code changed to "QE" in 1957.
Attack units of Navy Air Reserve at NAS Columbus	November 1946	A very short-lived assignment.
ATU-11, Advanced Training Unit 11	November 1947	
BTU-2, Basic Training Unit 2	September 1948	
HMLA-467	October 2008	

CB

Assigned to	Assigned on	Notes
VO-2C	7 November 1946, U.S. Navy Letter ACL 156-46	
VP-ML-3 Re-designated VP-3	7 November 1946, U.S. Navy Letter ACL 156-46	Tail code changed to "MB" in 1950.
ATU-12, Advanced Training Unit 12	November 1947	
IBTU, Instructor Basic Training Unit	September 1948	
CQTU-4, Carrier Qualification Training Unit 4	August 1950	
VP-9	March 1951	Tail code changed to "PD" in 1957.
VMAQ-1 Re-designated VMAQT-1	July 1992	Deactivated in 2016

CC

Assigned to	Assigned on	Notes
USS Saratoga (CV-3)	July 1945	
USS Cowpens (CVL-25)	8 January 1946, U.S. Navy Letter FF12-5	
VO-10C	7 November 1946, U.S. Navy Letter ACL 156-46	
VP-MS-4 Re-designated VP-44	7 November 1946, U.S. Navy Letter ACL 156-46	Code changed to "LM" in 1957.

CD

Assigned to	Assigned on	Notes
VP-1	4 August 1948, U.S. Navy Letter ACL 69-48	Code changed to "YB" in 1957.
ATU-800, Advanced Training Unit 800	Circa 1950	
VRC-40	July 1960	

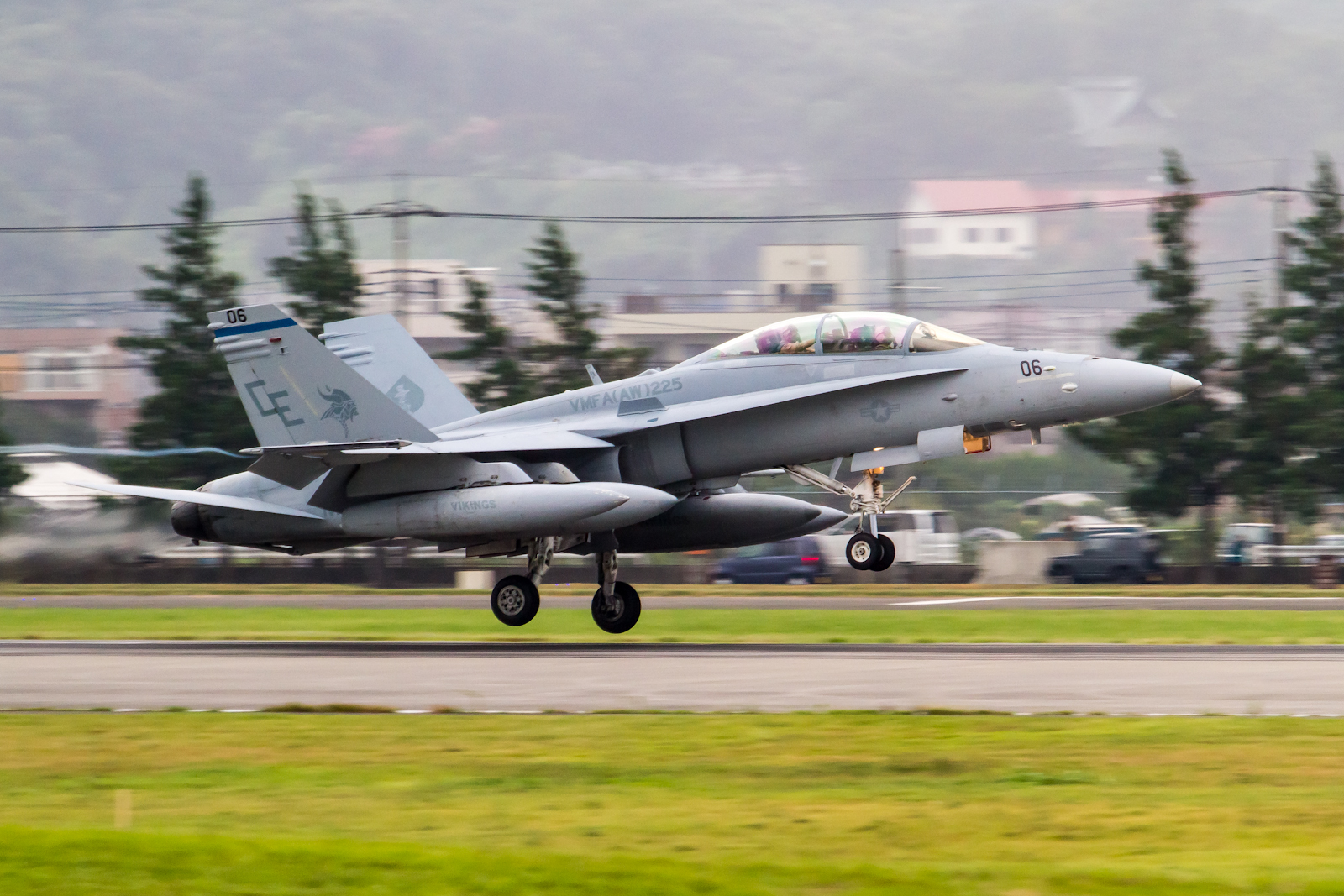
An F/A-18D Hornet from VMFA(AW)-225.

CE

Assigned to	Assigned on	Notes
VO-13C	7 November 1946, U.S. Navy Letter ACL 156-46	
VP-HL-2 Re-designated VP-22	4 August 1948, U.S. Navy Letter ACL 69-48	Code changed to "QA" in 1957.
VMA-225 Re-designated VMA(AW)-225, then again VMA-225	1957	

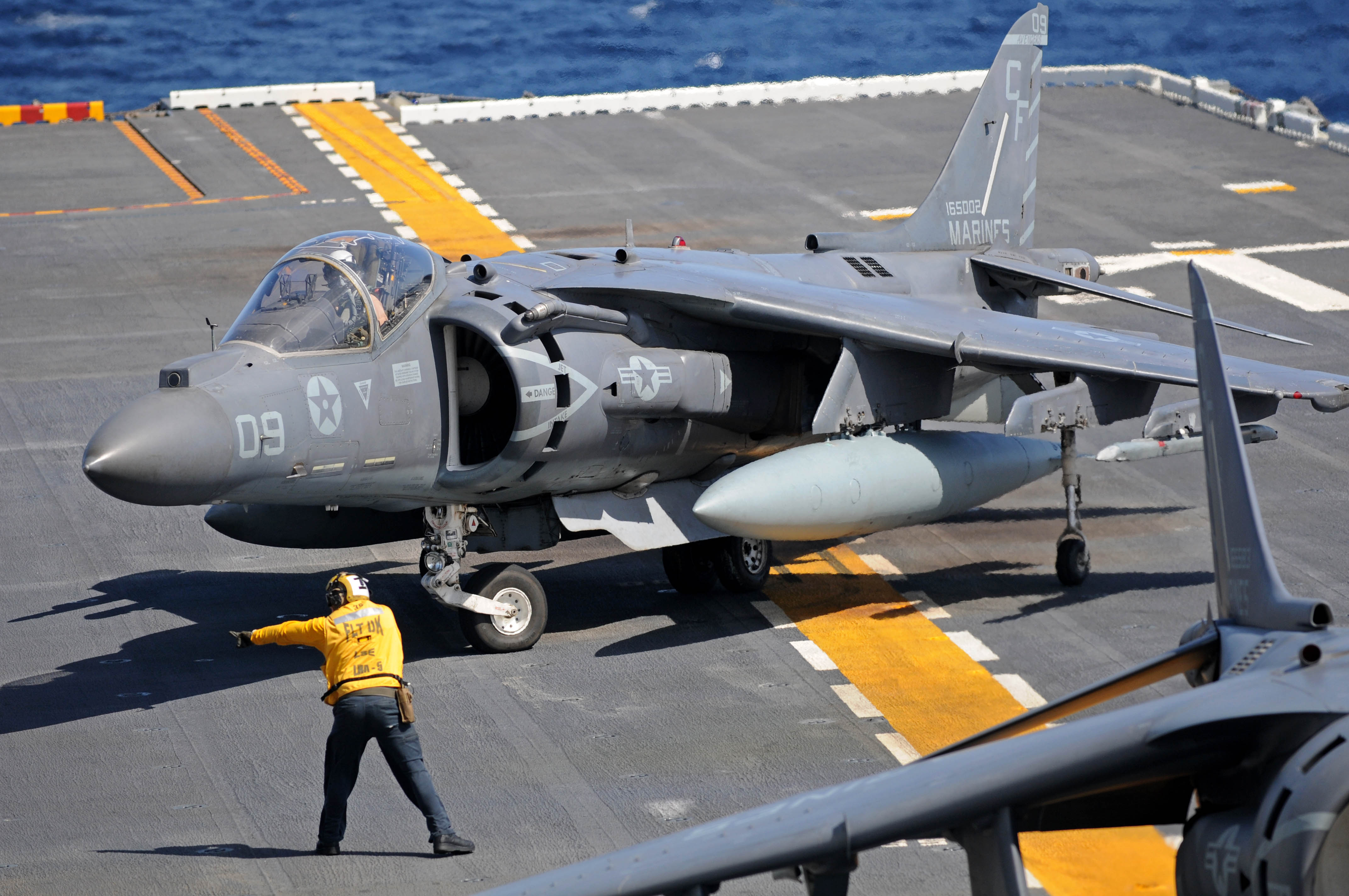
An AV-8B from VMA-211 in 2014.

CF

Assigned to	Assigned on	Notes
VO-15C	7 November 1946, U.S. Navy Letter ACL 156-46	
Fighter units of Navy Air Reserve at NAS Columbus	November 1946	A very short-lived assignment.
VP-HL-8 Re-designated VP-28	4 August 1948, U.S. Navy Letter ACL 69-48	Code changed to "QC" in 1957.
VMA-211	1957	

CG

Assigned to	Assigned on	Notes
VMA-231	May 1973	

CH

Assigned to	Assigned on	Notes
VO-17C	7 November 1946, U.S. Navy Letter ACL 156-46	
VP-871 Re-designated VP-19	February 1951	Code changed to "PE" in 1957.

CI

Assigned to	Assigned on	Notes
VO-3C	12 December 1946, U.S. Navy Letter ACL 165-46	

CJ

Assigned to	Assigned on	Notes
HMR(M)-461 Re-designated HMH-461	January 1957	

CK

Assigned to	Assigned on	Notes
Operational Development Squadron	12 December 1946, U.S. Navy Letter ACL 165-46	

CM

Assigned to	Assigned on	Notes
VMJ-2 Re-designated VMCJ-2	September 1952	Code changed to "CY" in 1957.

CN

Assigned to	Assigned on	Notes
H&MS-14, Headquarters and Maintenance Squadron 14 Re-designated MALS-14, Marine Aviation Logistics Squadron 14	1957	

CP

Assigned to	Assigned on	Notes
VS-935	October 1961	Deactivated in August 1962.

CQ

Assigned to	Assigned on	Notes
VS-751	October 1961	Deactivated in August 1962.

CS

Assigned to	Assigned on	Notes
VS-915	October 1961	Deactivated in August 1962.

CT

Assigned to	Assigned on	Notes
VS-733	October 1961	Deactivated in August 1962.

CU

Assigned to	Assigned on	Notes
VS-821	October 1961	Deactivated in August 1962.

CV

Assigned to	Assigned on	Notes
VS-861	October 1961	Deactivated in August 1962.

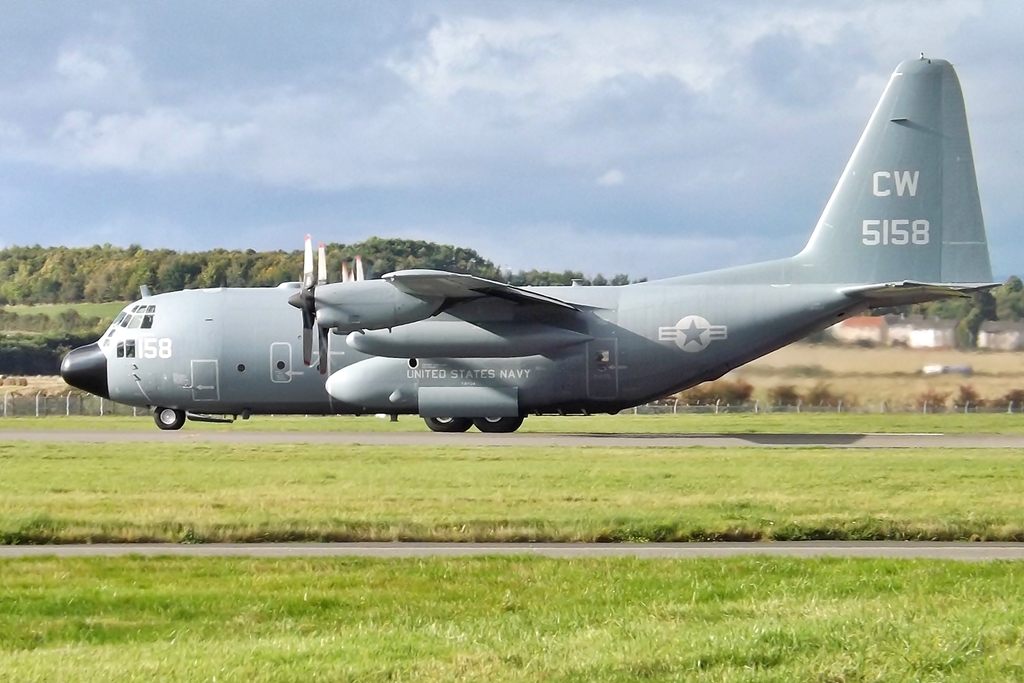
This C-130T of Fleet Logistics Support Squadron 54 shows the unit's "CW" code.

CW

Assigned to	Assigned on	Notes
VR-54		

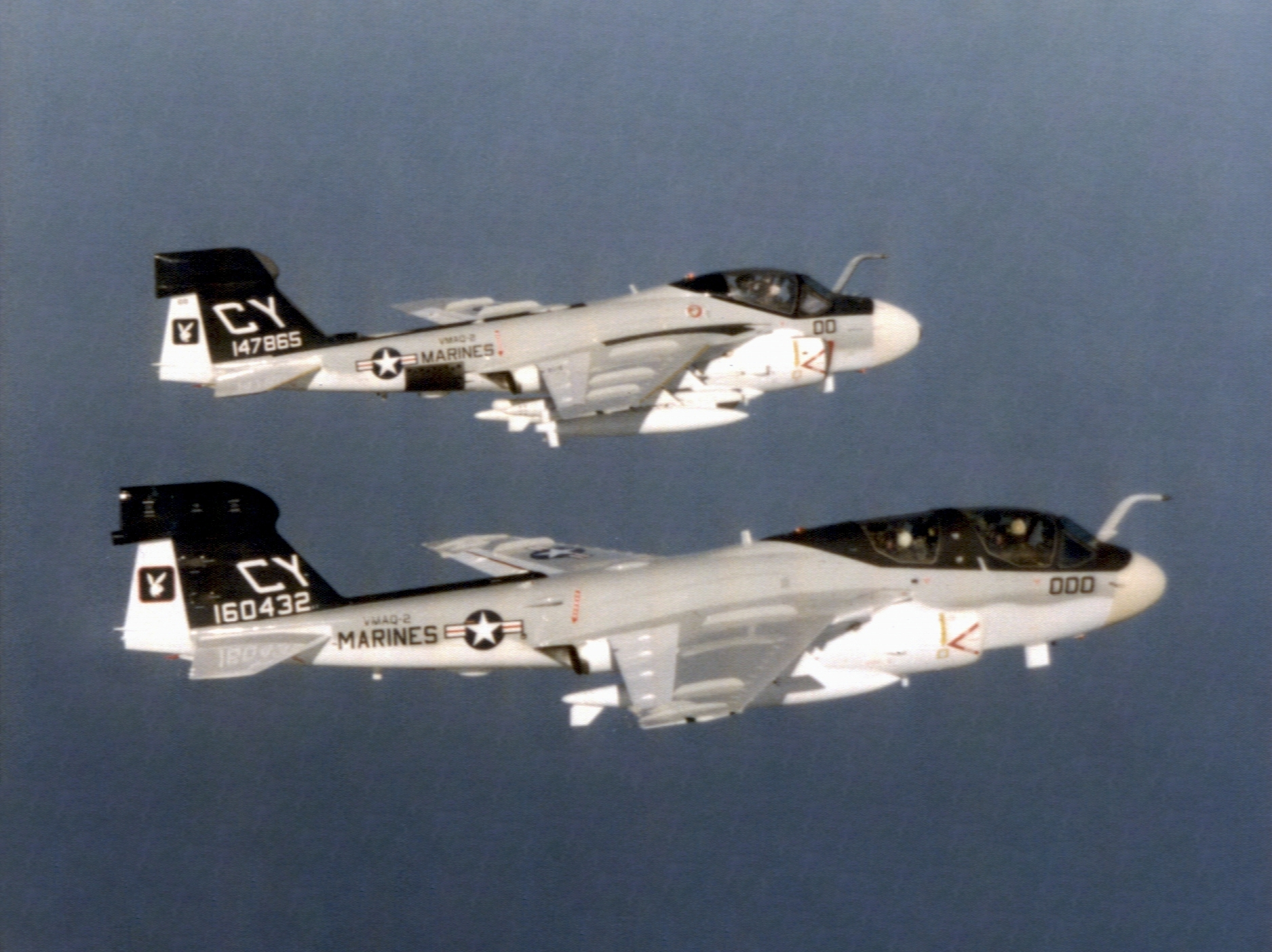
VMAQ-2 planes in flight.

CY

Assigned to	Assigned on	Notes
VMC-2 Subsequently, re-designated VMCJ-2 and VMAQ-2	1957	

CZ

Assigned to	Assigned on	Notes
Maintenance and Repair Squadron 27 (MARS-27) Re-designated H&MS-27, Headquarters and Maintenance Squadron 27	1957	

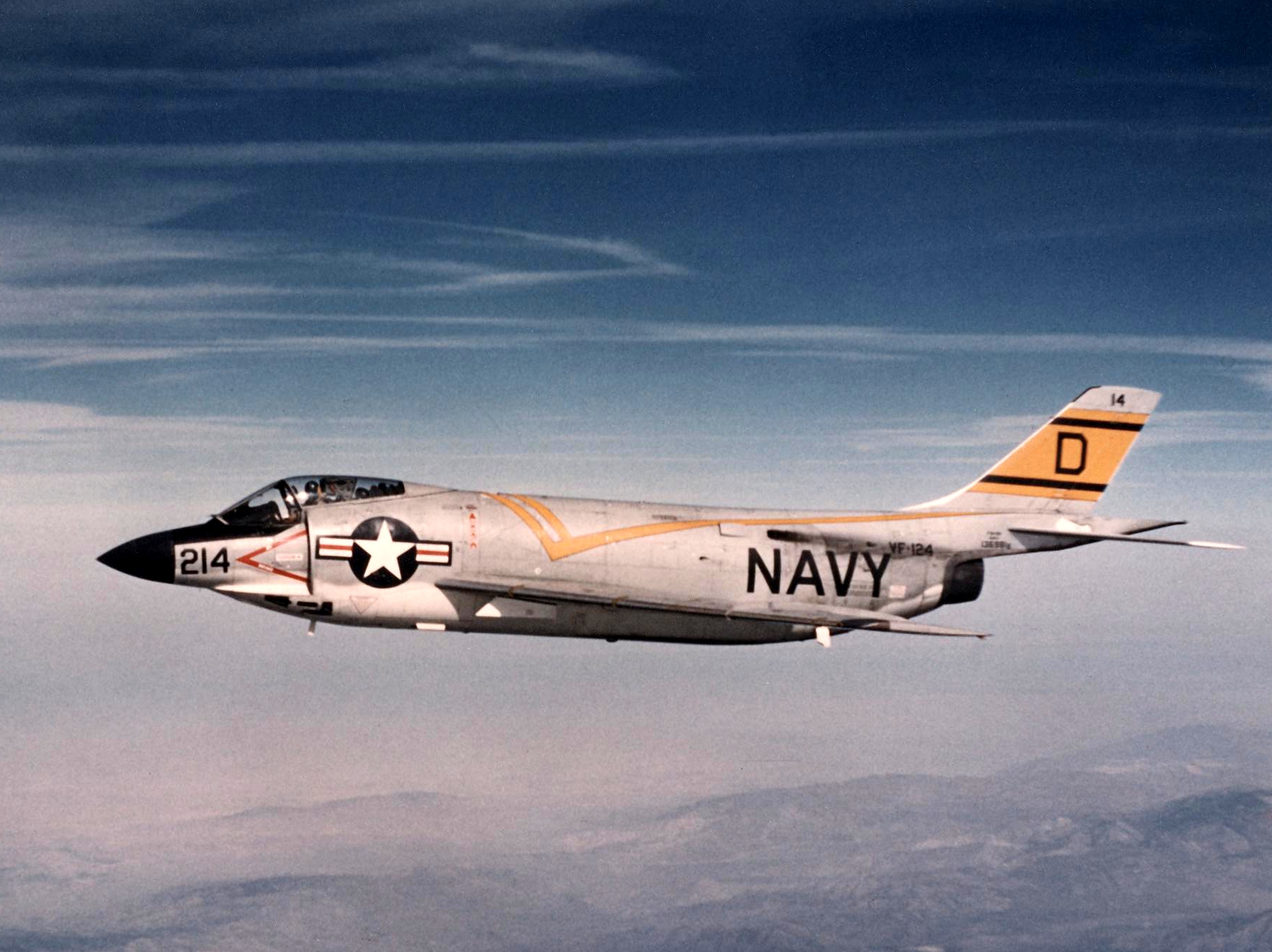
Tail code carried by this F3H-2N Demon in 1958 indicates assignment to Carrier Air Group 12.

D

Assigned to	Assigned on	Notes
USS Independence (CVL-22)	July 1945	
USS Oriskany (CV-34)	8 January 1946, U.S. Navy Letter FF12-5	Only in effect until December 1946.
CVG-9, Carrier Air Group 9	4 August 1948, U.S. Navy Letter ACL 69-48	
Navy Air Reserve units at NAS Dallas	November 1946	The "D" code issued to this NAS was a controlled duplicate of the same code letter given to CVG-9. Code changed to "7D" in 1956.
CVG-12, Carrier Air Group 12	July 1953	Tail code changed to "NJ" in November 1956.

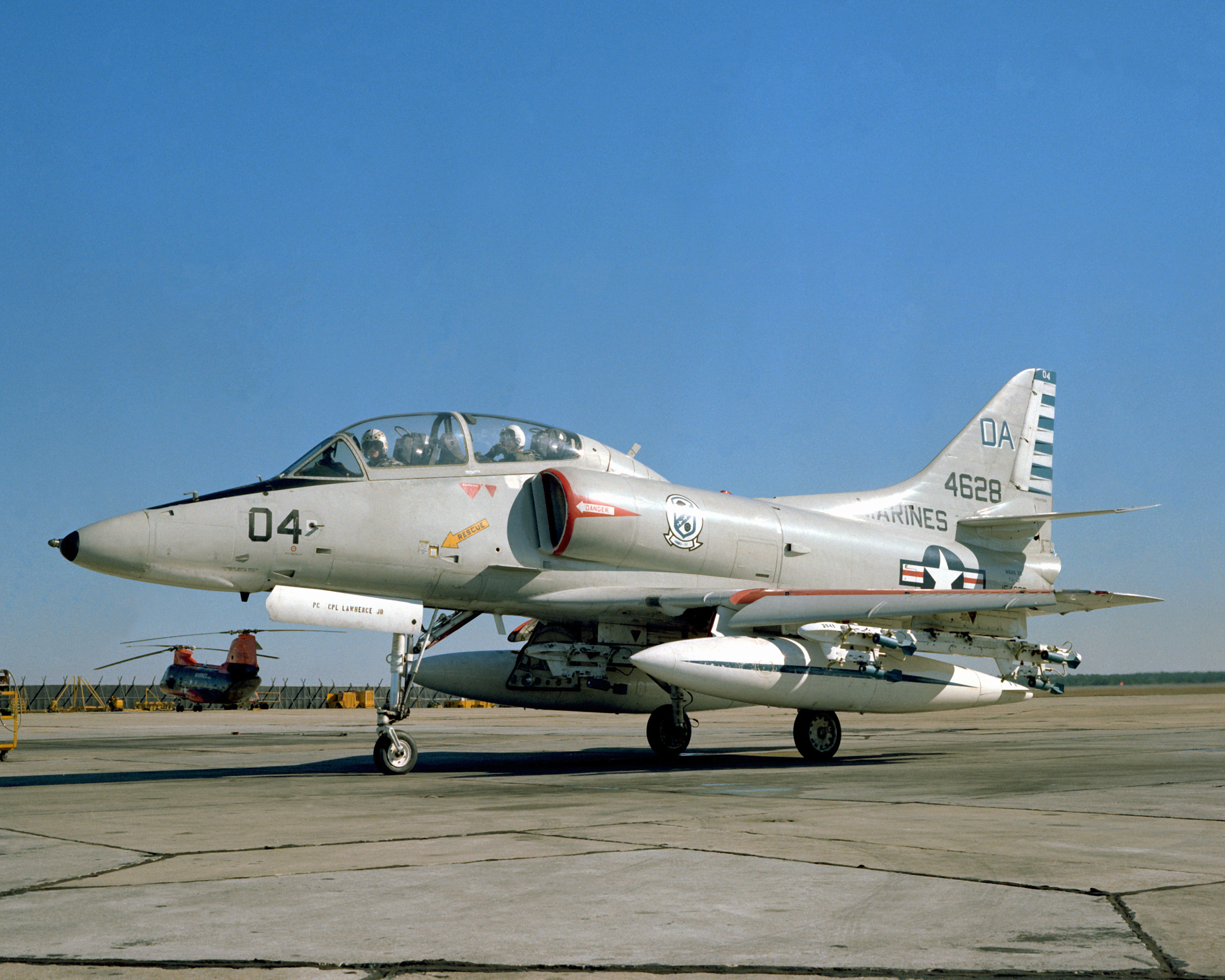
"DA" code on this 1978 photo indicates assignment to Headquarters and Maintenance Squadron 32.

DA

Assigned to	Assigned on	Notes
VP-AM-1	7 November 1946, U.S. Navy Letter ACL 156-46	Disestablished in May 1948.
Attack units of Navy Air Reserve at NAS Dallas	November 1946	A very short-lived assignment.
GMGRU-1, Guided Missile Group 1	September 1955	Code changed to "ZZ" in 1957.
H&MS-32, Headquarters and Maintenance Squadron 32	1957	

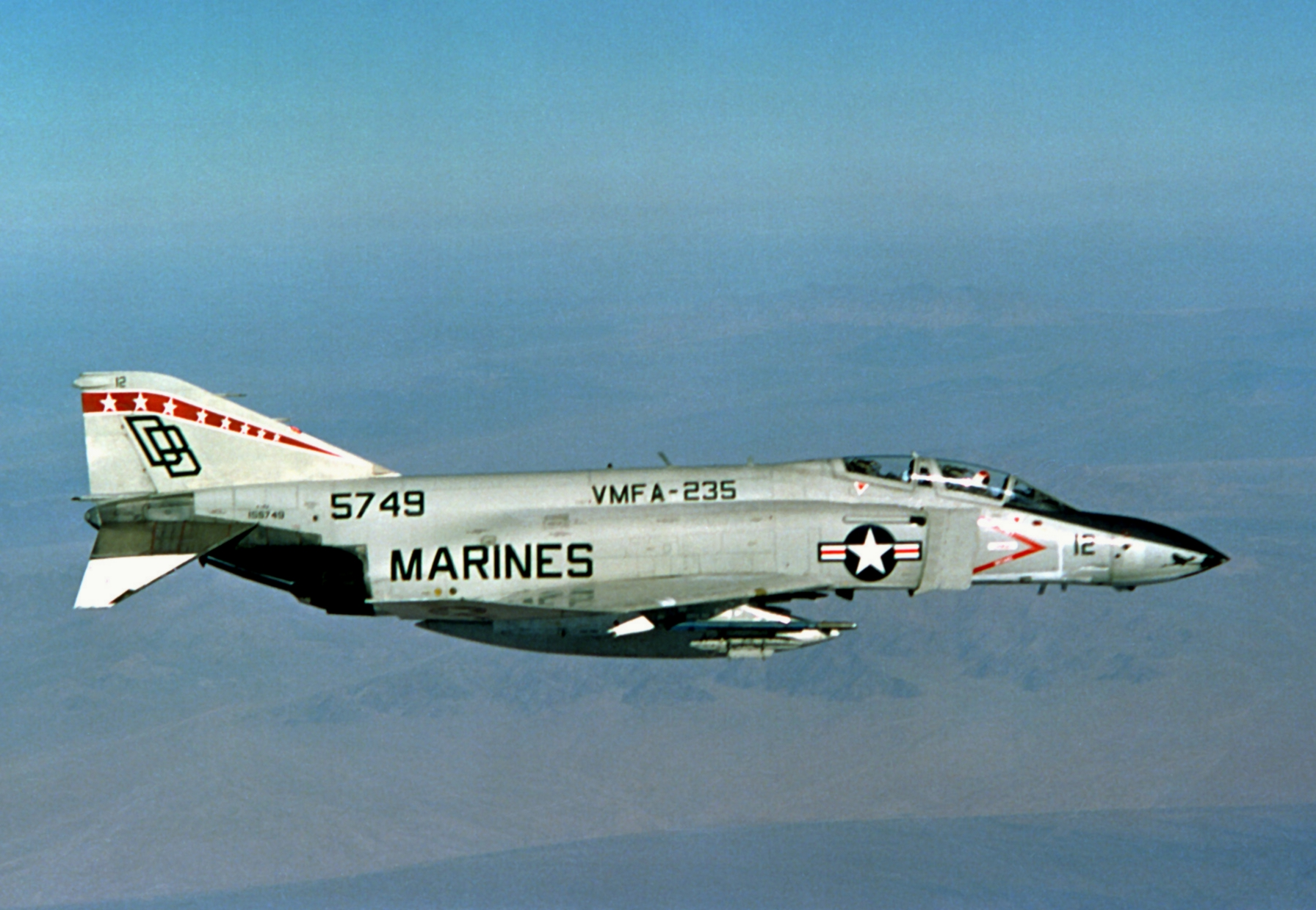
A VMFA-235 F-4S Phantom II in flight.

DB

Assigned to	Assigned on	Notes
VP-AM-2 Re-designated VP-32	7 November 1946, U.S. Navy Letter ACL 156-46	Disestablished in June 1949.
GMGRU-2, Guided Missile Group 2	September 1955	
VMF-235 Re-designated VMFA-235	1957	Disestablished in June 1996.

DC

Assigned to	Assigned on	Notes
VP-HL-7 Re-designated VP-27	7 November 1946, U.S. Navy Letter ACL 156-46	Disestablished in January 1950.
VMF-122 Subsequently, re-designated VMF(AW)-122 and VMFA-122	1957	

DD

Assigned to	Assigned on	Notes
USS Independence (CVL-22)	8 January 1946, U.S. Navy Letter FF12-5	
VP-HL-10 Re-designated VP-20	7 November 1946, U.S. Navy Letter ACL 156-46	Disestablished in March 1949.
VX-31		

DE

Assigned to	Assigned on	Notes
VP-HL-12 Re-designated VP-29	7 November 1946, U.S. Navy Letter ACL 156-46	Disestablished in January 1950.

DF

Assigned to	Assigned on	Notes
VP-AM-5	7 November 1946, U.S. Navy Letter ACL 156-46	Disestablished in December 1947.
Fighter units of Navy Air Reserve at NAS Dallas	November 1946	A very short-lived assignment.

DH

Assigned to	Assigned on	Notes
HM-12	1 April 1971	Disestablished on 30 September 1994
HM-12(2nd)	1 October 2015	

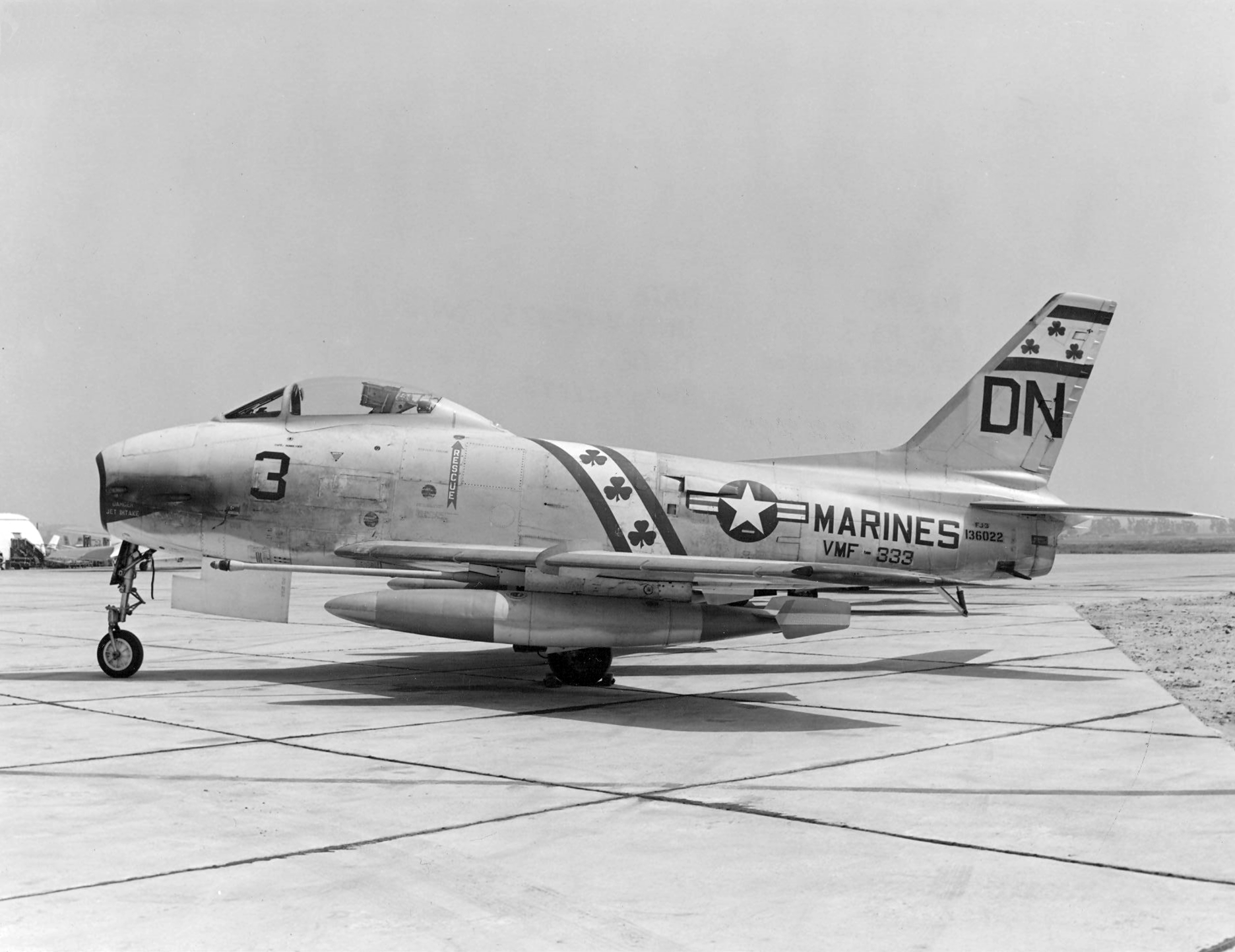
An FJ-3 Fury on VMF-333.

DN

Assigned to	Assigned on	Notes
VMF-333 Re-designated VMFA-333	1957	Disestablished in March 1992.

DP

Assigned to	Assigned on	Notes
VMA-331	1957	Code changed to "VL" in 1959.

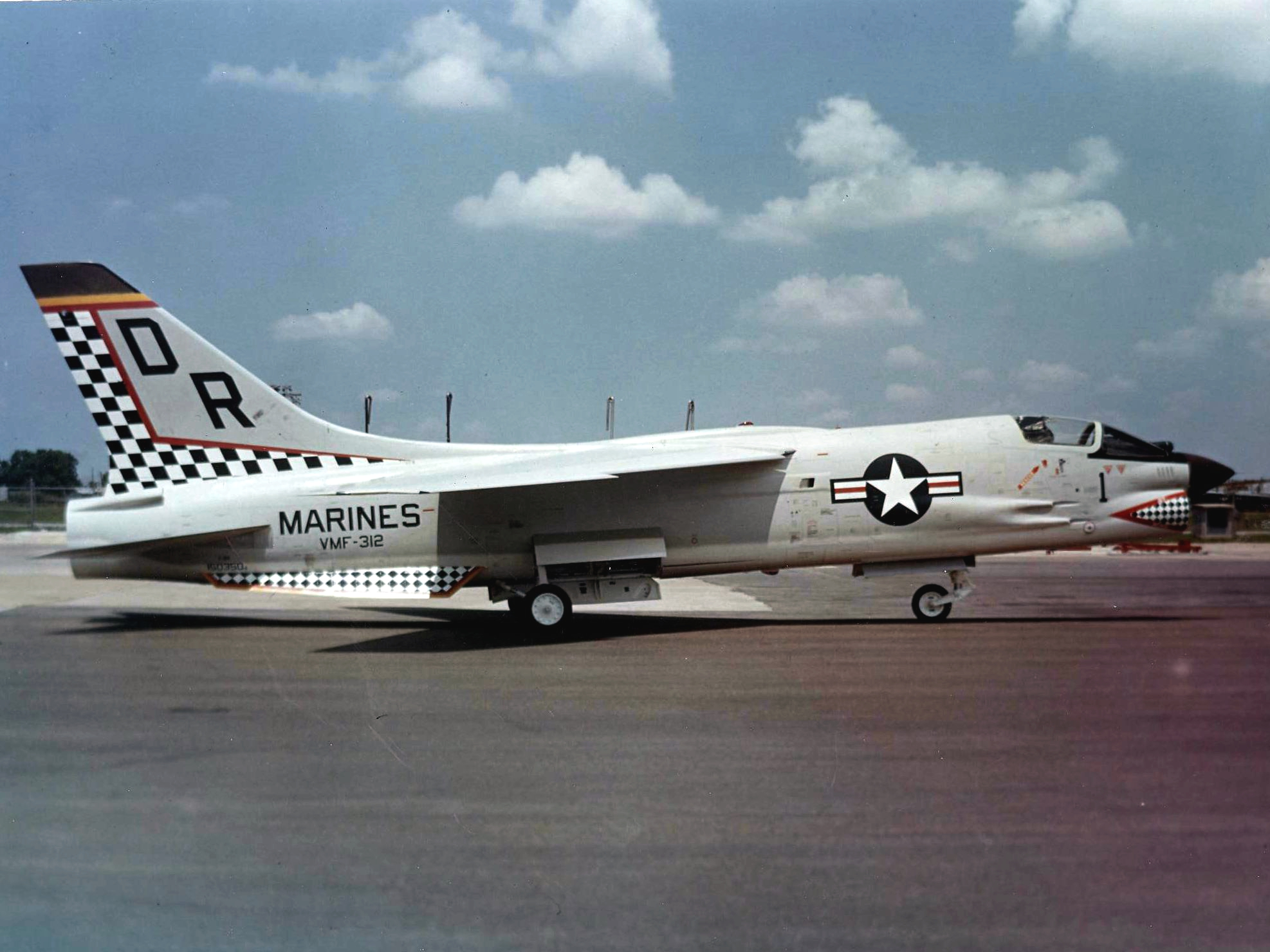
An F-8E Crusader on VMF-312.

DR

Assigned to	Assigned on	Notes
VMF-312 Re-designated VMFA-312	1957	

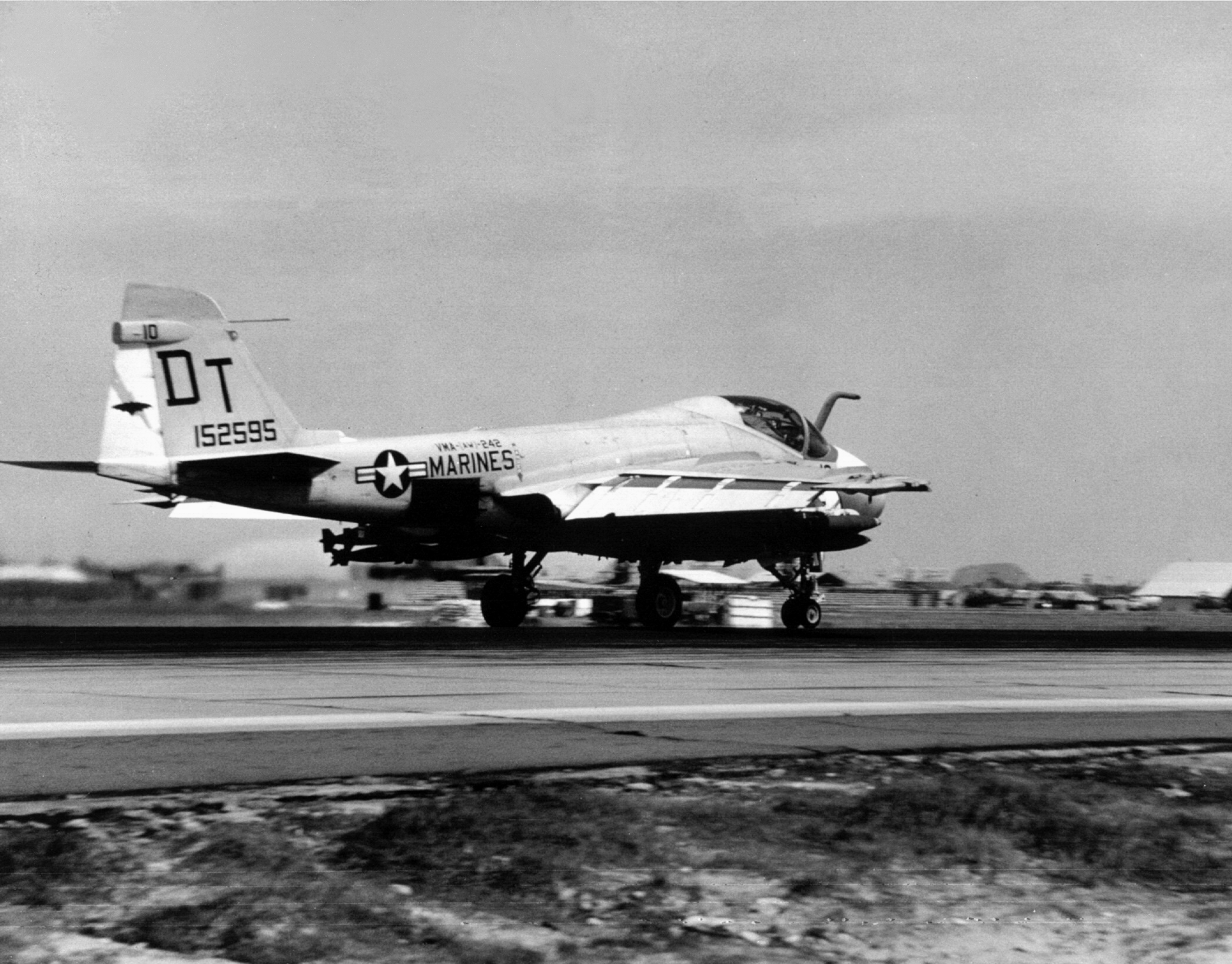
An A-6A Intruder VMA(AW)-242 takes off from Da Nang.

DT

Assigned to	Assigned on	Notes
VMA(AW)-242	October 1960	

DV

Assigned to	Assigned on	Notes
H&MS-31, Headquarters and Maintenance Squadron 31	1957	Disestablished in January 1959.

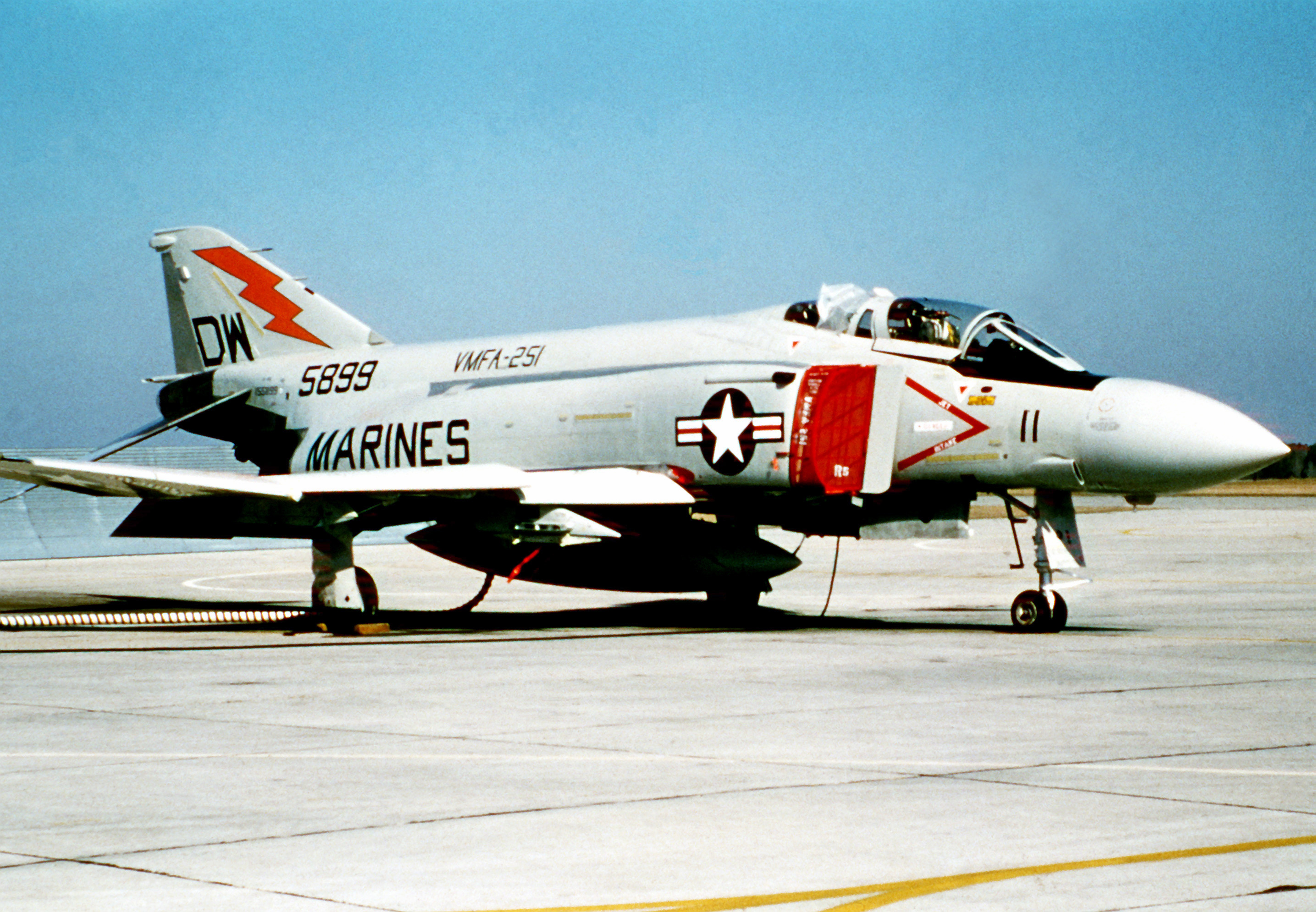
The squadron's "DW" tail code is seen on this VMFA-251 F-4S Phantom II.

DW

Assigned to	Assigned on	Notes
VMF-251 Re-designated VMFA-251	Circa 1957	

DX

Assigned to	Assigned on	Notes
VMA-324	1957	Disestablished in August 1974.

DZ

Assigned to	Assigned on	Notes
VMR-353	1957	Disestablished in March 1963.

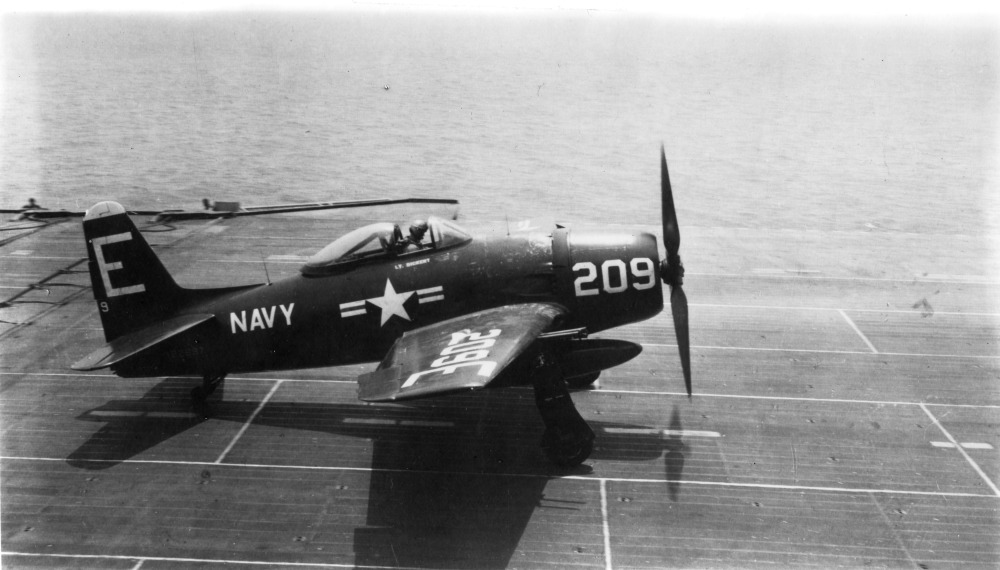
A Carrier Air Group 8 F8F-2 Bearcat seen on the USS Midway.

E

Assigned to	Assigned on	Notes
USS Intrepid (CV-11)	July 1945	
USS Essex (CV-9)	8 January 1946, U.S. Navy Letter FF12-5	
Marine Corps Air Base, Cherry Point	7 November 1946, U.S. Navy Letter ACL 156-46	
CVG-8, Carrier Air Group 8	4 August 1948, U.S. Navy Letter ACL 69-48	Tail code changed to "AJ" in November 1956.
Navy Air Reserve units at NAS Minneapolis	November 1946	The "E" code issued to this NAS was a controlled duplicate of the same code letter given to CVG-8. Code changed to "7E" in 1956.
TW-5, Training Air Wing 5		Comprise VT-2, VT-3, VT-6, HT-8, HT-18, HT-28.

EA

Assigned to	Assigned on	Notes
Marine Corps Schools, Quantico	7 November 1946, U.S. Navy Letter ACL 156-46	
VP-MS-9 Re-designated VP-49	7 November 1946, U.S. Navy Letter ACL 156-46	Tail code changed to "LP" in 1957.
HTU-1, Helicopter Training Unit 1	August 1951	
VMA-332 Re-designated VMA(AW)-332	1957	Disestablished in March 2007.

EB

Assigned to	Assigned on	Notes
VP-AM-3 Re-designated VP-33	7 November 1946, U.S. Navy Letter ACL 156-46	Disestablished in December 1949.
VP-26	July 1950	Tail code changed to "LK" in 1957.

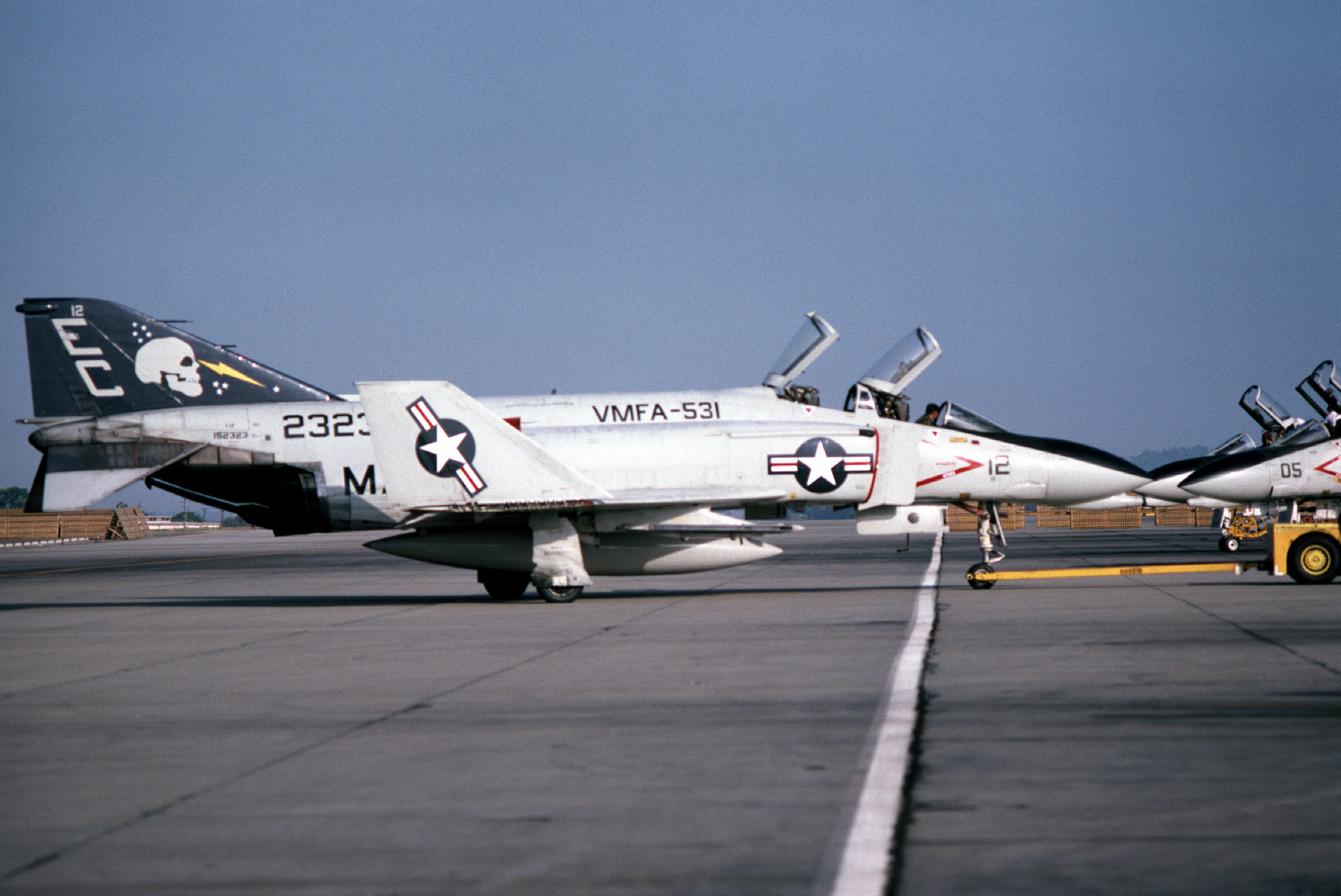
This F-4N Phantom II carries the "EC" code assigned to VMA(AW)-531.

EC

Assigned to	Assigned on	Notes
VP-AM-4 Re-designated VP-34	7 November 1946, U.S. Navy Letter ACL 156-46	Disestablished in June 1956.
VMF(AW)-531 Re-designated VMFA-531	1957	Disestablished in March 1992.

ED

Assigned to	Assigned on	Notes
VP-ML-5	7 November 1946, U.S. Navy Letter ACL 156-46	Tail code changed to "MC" in August 1948.
VMA-533 Subsequently, re-designated VMA(AW)-533 and VMFA(AW)-533	1957	

EE

Assigned to	Assigned on	Notes
USS Coral Sea (CV-43)	July 1945	Assignment remained on paper only as the USS Coral Sea was not commissioned until 1 October 1947.
USS Enterprise (CV-6)	8 January 1946, U.S. Navy Letter FF12-5	
VP-MS-5 Re-designated VP-45	7 November 1946, U.S. Navy Letter ACL 156-46	Tail code changed to "LN" in 1957.

EF

Assigned to	Assigned on	Notes
VPP-2 Re-designated VP-62	7 November 1946, U.S. Navy Letter ACL 156-46	Disestablished in January 1950.
VP-61 Re-designated VJ-61	January 1951	Tail code changed to "PB" in 1953.

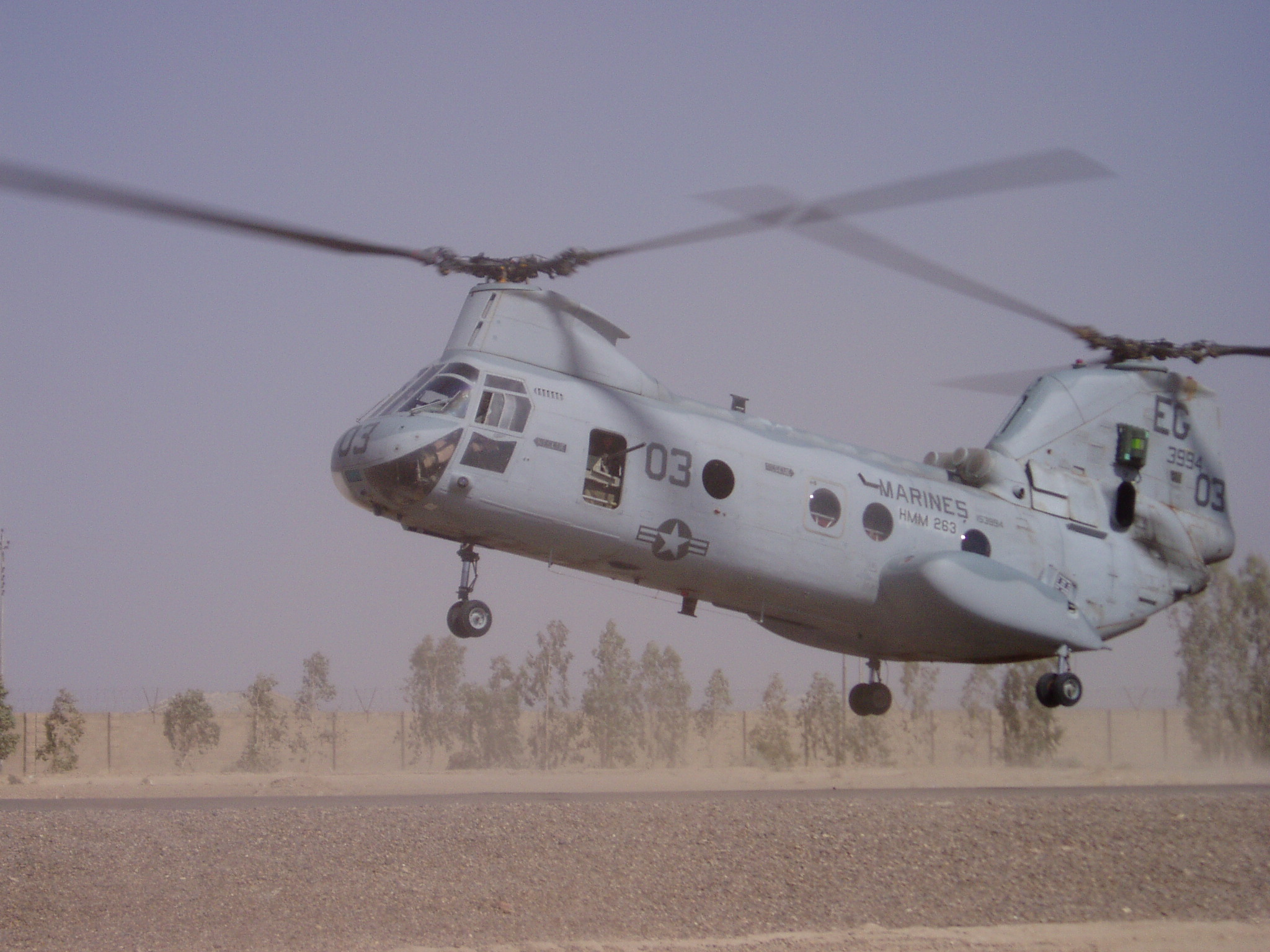
"EG" on this Sea Knight helicopter indicates assignment to HMM-263.

EG

Assigned to	Assigned on	Notes
HMR-263 Subsequently, re-designated HMM-263 and VMM-263	1957	

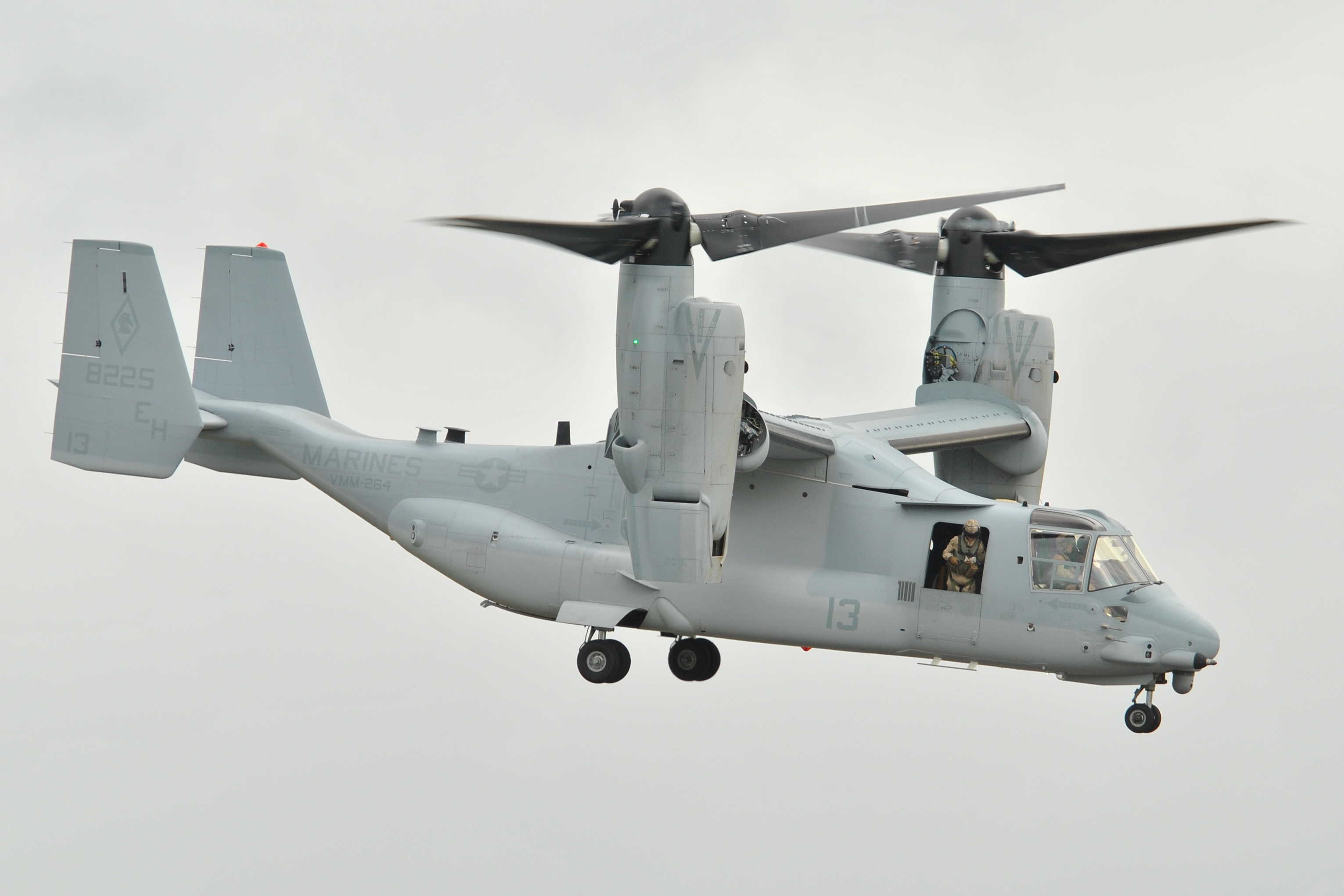
An MV-22B Osprey of VMM-264.

EH

Assigned to	Assigned on	Notes
VP-HL-3 Re-designated VP-23	4 August 1948, U.S. Navy Letter ACL 69-48	Tail code changed to "MA" in July 1950.
VP-56	September 1950	Tail code changed to "LQ" in 1957.
HMM-264 Re-designated VMM-264	June 1959	Squadron Disestablished August 2020.

EK

Assigned to	Assigned on	Notes
VMF(AW)-114	1957	Disestablished in July 1963.

EL

Assigned to	Assigned on	Notes
H&MS-26, Headquarters and Maintenance Squadron 26	1957	

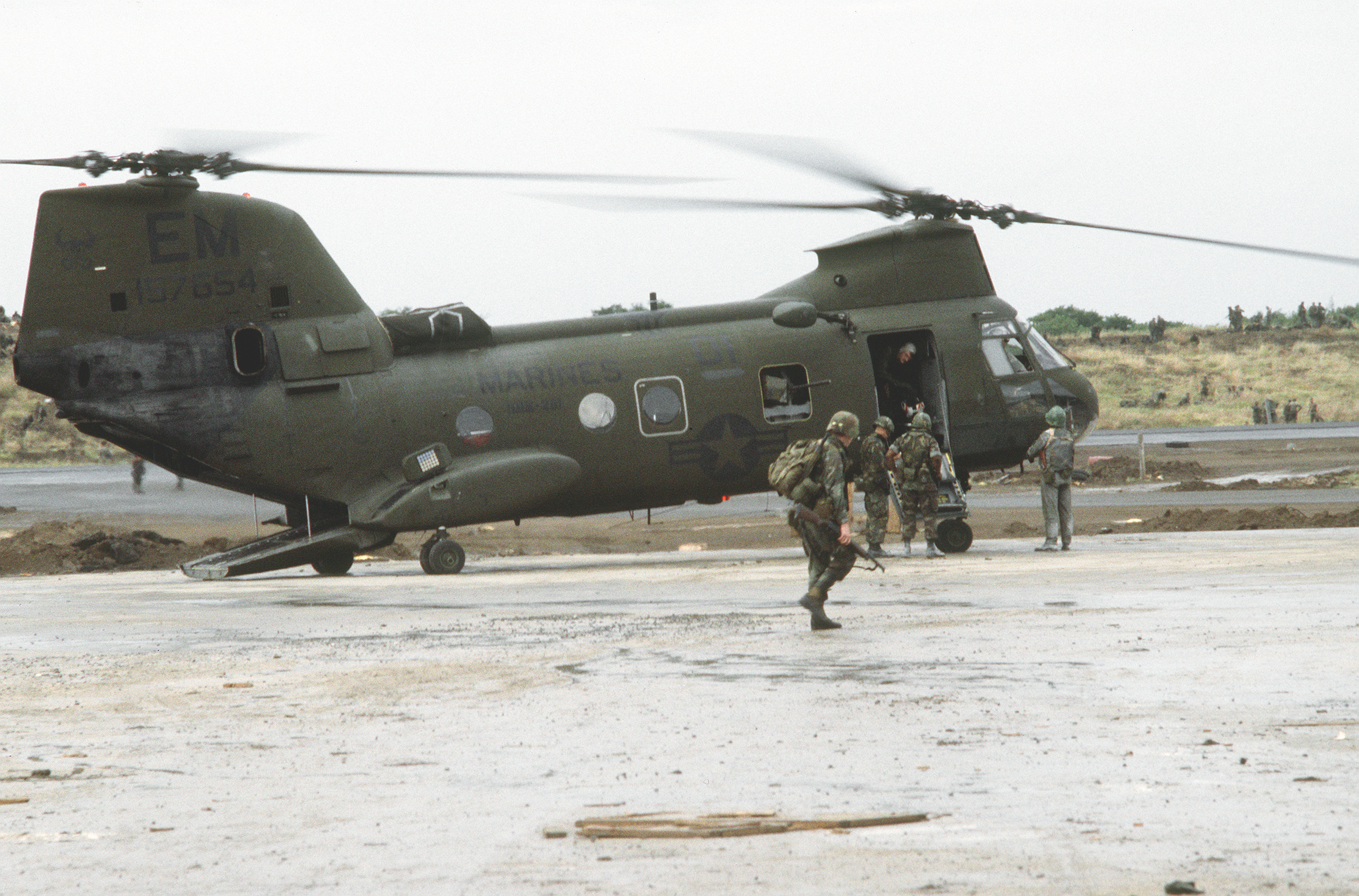
A subdued "EM" code can be seen on this CH-46F Sea Knight of HMM-261.

EM

Assigned to	Assigned on	Notes
VP-HL-7	1948	Code changed to "HE" in 1948.
HMR(L)-261 Subsequently, re-designated HMM-261 and VMM-261	1957	

EN

Assigned to	Assigned on	Notes
HMH-464	1957	

EP

Assigned to	Assigned on	Notes
HMM-265 Re-designated VMM-265	October 1962	Disestablished in November 1970, reactivated in September 1977 with the same tail code.

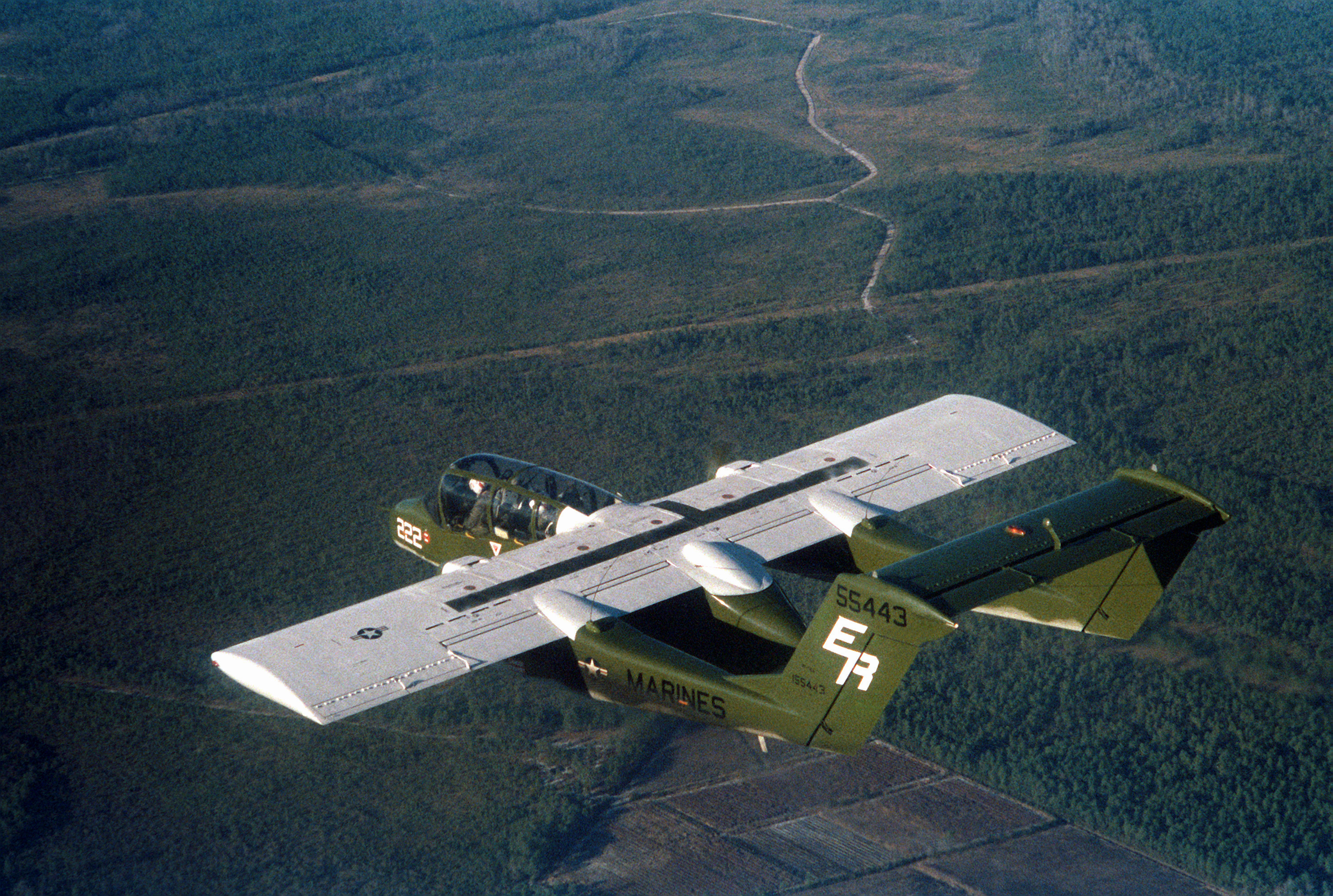
An OV-10A Bronco of VMO-1 shows off its "ER" tail code.

ER

Assigned to	Assigned on	Notes
VPM-3	7 November 1946, U.S. Navy Letter ACL 156-46	
VMO-1	1957	Disestablished in July 1993.

An AV-8B Harrier II assigned to HMM-266 is seen displaying the squadron's "ES" tail code.

ES

Assigned to	Assigned on	Notes
HMM-266 Re-designated VMM-266	26 April 1983	

ET

Assigned to	Assigned on	Notes
HMR(L)-262 Subsequently, re-designated HMM-262 and VMM-262	September 1951	

EU

Assigned to	Assigned on	Notes
Utility units of Navy Air Reserve at NAS Minneapolis	November 1946	A very short-lived assignment.

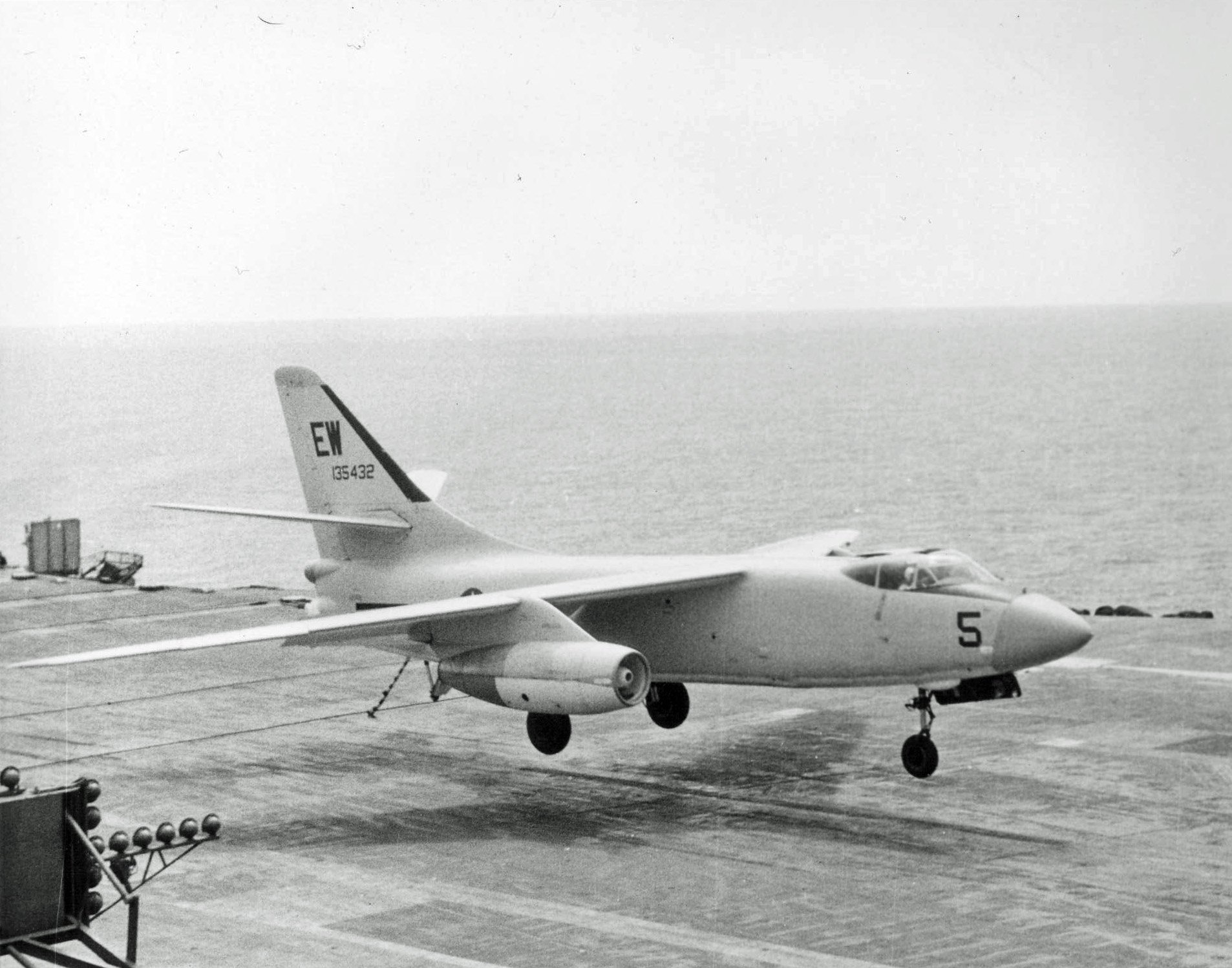
An A3D-1 belonging to VAH-3 and displaying a short-lived "EW" code.

EW

Assigned to	Assigned on	Notes
VPW-1 Re-designated VP-51	April 1948	Disestablished in February 1950.
VAH-3	1956	Code changed to "GJ" in 1957.
H&MS-24, Headquarters and Maintenance Squadron 24	1957	

EX

Assigned to	Assigned on	Notes
H&MS-31, Headquarters and Maintenance Squadron 31	July 1971	

EZ

Assigned to	Assigned on	Notes
VMU-2, Marine Unmanned Aerial Vehicle Squadron 2	June 1984	

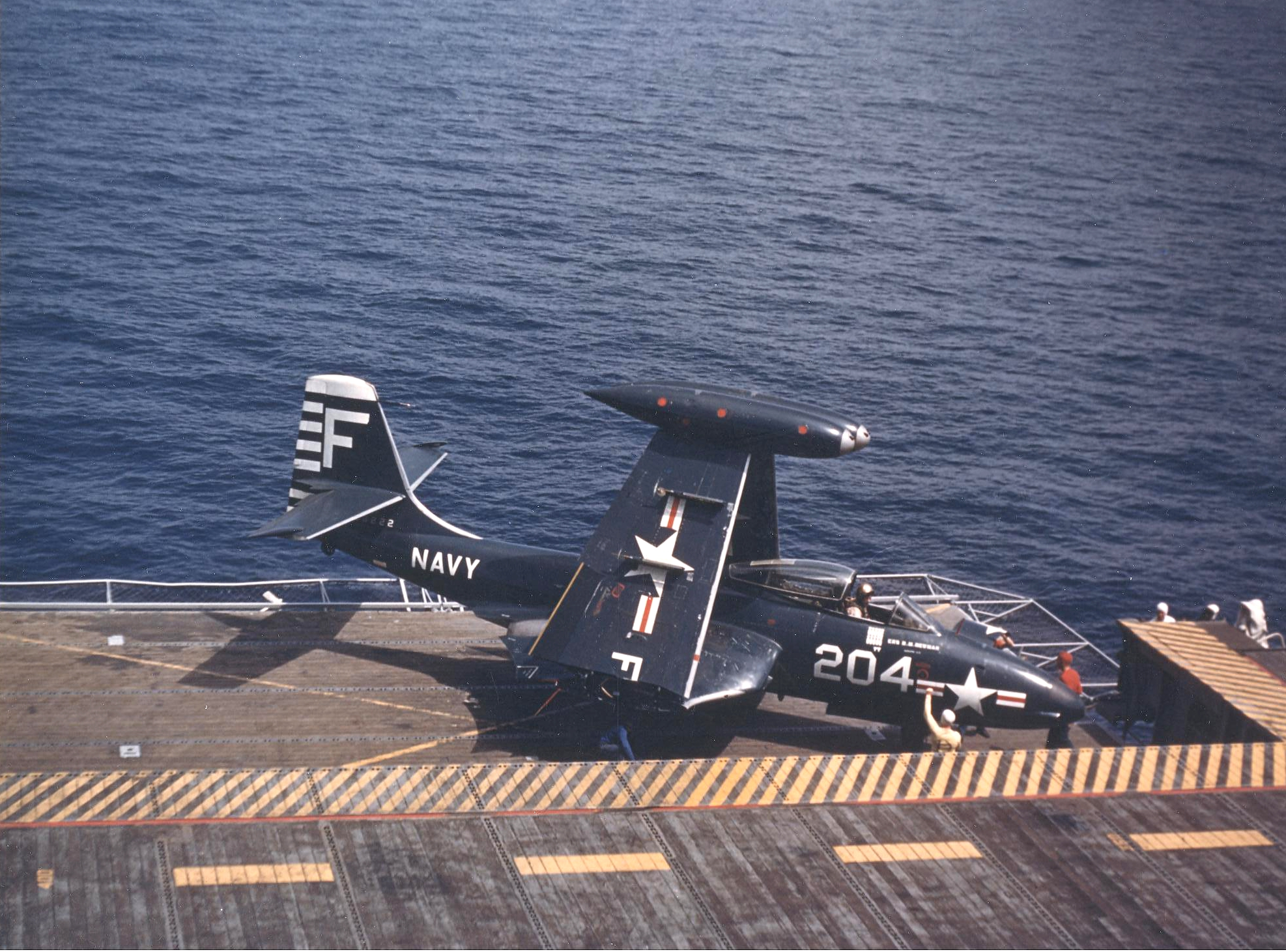
Tail code on this F2H-2 Banshee indicates assignment to Carrier Air Group 4.

F

Assigned to	Assigned on	Notes
USS Essex (CV-9)	July 1945	
USS Franklin D. Roosevelt (CV-42)	8 January 1946, U.S. Navy Letter FF12-5	
CVBG-3	12 December 1946, U.S. Navy Letter ACL 165-46	
Navy Air Reserve units at NAS Jacksonville	November 1946	The "F" code issued to this NAS was a controlled duplicate of the same code letter given to CVBG-3. Code changed to "6F" in 1956.
Navy Air Reserve units at NAS Oakland	September 1948	"F" was retained by both NAS Jacksonville and NAS Oakland. Code changed to "7F" in 1956.
CVG-4, Carrier Air Group 4	July 1953	Tail code changed to "AD" in November 1956.
TW-6, Training Air Wing 6		Comprise VT-4, VT-10, VT-86.

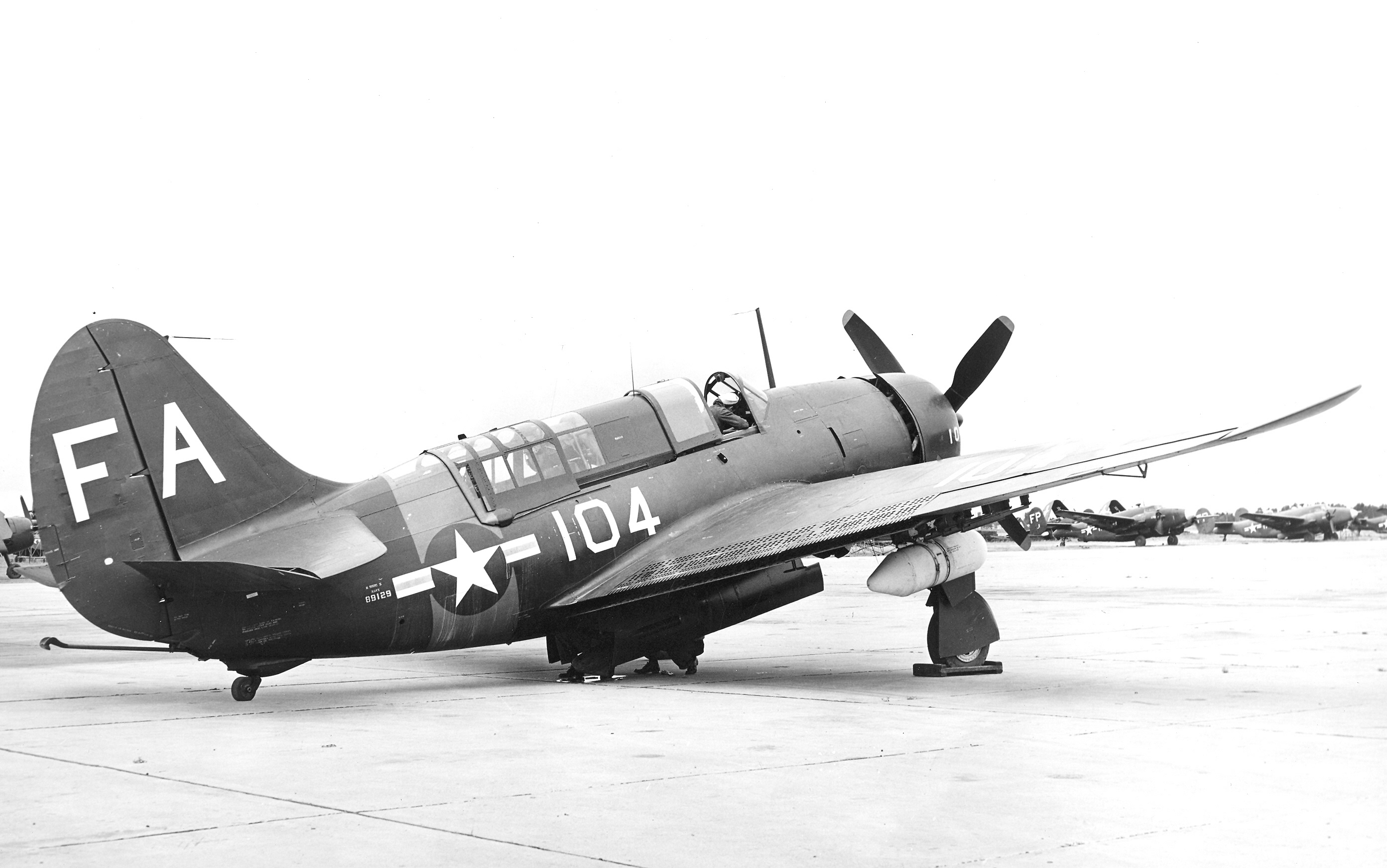
On this SB2C-5 Helldiver, the "F" stands for NAS Oakland and the "A" indicates assignment to an attack unit.

FA

Assigned to	Assigned on	Notes
Attack units of Navy Air Reserve at NAS Jacksonville and NAS Oakland	November 1946	A very short-lived assignment.
FAETULANT, Fleet Airborne Electronics Training Unit Atlantic	1949	
FASRON-2, Fleet Air Service Squadron 2	1957	Disestablished in 1959.

FB

Assigned to	Assigned on	Notes
FASRON-3, Fleet Air Service Squadron 3	1957	Disestablished in 1960.

FC

Assigned to	Assigned on	Notes
FASRON-5, Fleet Air Service Squadron 5	1957	Disestablished in 1959.

FD

Assigned to	Assigned on	Notes
FASRON-6, Fleet Air Service Squadron 6	1957	Disestablished in 1959.

FE

Assigned to	Assigned on	Notes
FASRON-9, Fleet Air Service Squadron 9	1957	Disestablished in 1960.

FF

Assigned to	Assigned on	Notes
USS Franklin D. Roosevelt (CV-42)	July 1945	
USS Hornet (CV-12)	8 January 1946, U.S. Navy Letter FF12-5	Only in effect until December 1946.
Fighter units of Navy Air Reserve at NAS Jacksonville and NAS Oakland	November 1946	A very short-lived assignment.
VMU-3, Marine Unmanned Aerial Vehicle Squadron 3	September 2008	

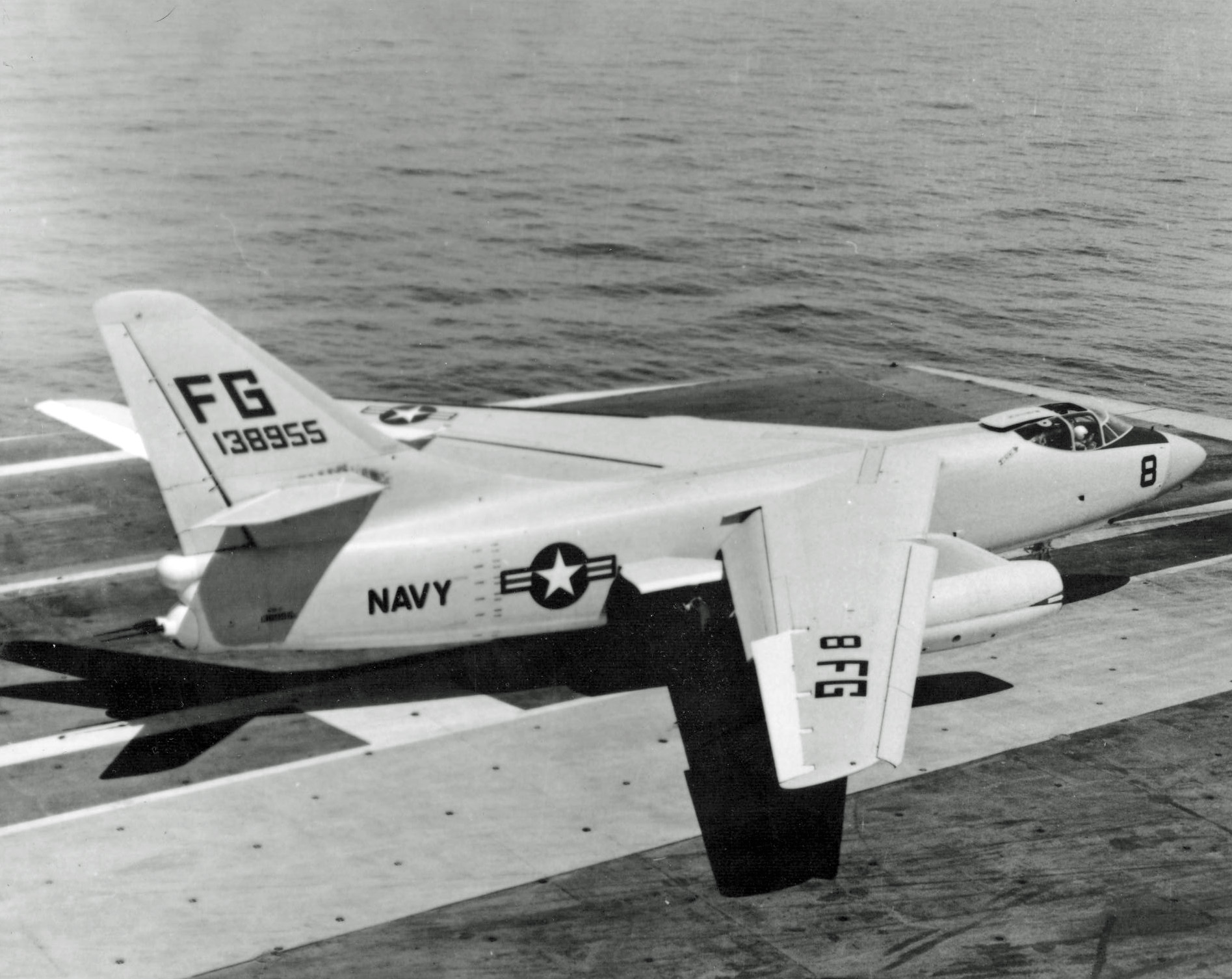
An A3D-2 belonging to VAH-9 and displaying a short-lived "FG" code.

FG

Assigned to	Assigned on	Notes
VC-9 Re-dsignaed VAH-9	July 1953	Code changed to "GM" in 1957.
FASRON-51, Fleet Air Service Squadron 51	1957	Disestablished in 1960.

FH

Assigned to	Assigned on	Notes
FASRON-101, Fleet Air Service Squadron 101	1957	Disestablished.

FJ

Assigned to	Assigned on	Notes
FASRON-102, Fleet Air Service Squadron 102	1957	Disestablished in 1960.

FK

Assigned to	Assigned on	Notes
FASRON-104, Fleet Air Service Squadron 104	1957	Disestablished in 1959.
H&MS-29, Headquarters and Maintenance Squadron 29	May 1972	

FL

Assigned to	Assigned on	Notes
FASRON-105, Fleet Air Service Squadron 105	1957	Disestablished in 1960.

FM

Assigned to	Assigned on	Notes
FASRON-106, Fleet Air Service Squadron 106	1957	Disestablished in 1960.

FN

Assigned to	Assigned on	Notes
FASRON-107, Fleet Air Service Squadron 107	1957	Disestablished in 1960.

FP

Assigned to	Assigned on	Notes
Patrol units of Navy Air Reserve at NAS Jacksonville and NAS Oakland	November 1946	A very short-lived assignment.
FAETUPAC, Fleet Airborne Electronics Training Unit Pacific	1949	
FASRON-108, Fleet Air Service Squadron 108	1957	Disestablished in 1959.

FQ

Assigned to	Assigned on	Notes
FASRON-109, Fleet Air Service Squadron 109	1957	Disestablished in 1959.

FR

Assigned to	Assigned on	Notes
FASRON-111, Fleet Air Service Squadron 111	1957	Disestablished in 1960.

FS

Assigned to	Assigned on	Notes
FASRON-121, Fleet Air Service Squadron 121	1957	Disestablished in 1959.

FT

Assigned to	Assigned on	Notes
FASRON-200, Fleet Air Service Squadron 200	1957	Disestablished in 1960.

FU

Assigned to	Assigned on	Notes
FASRON-201, Fleet Air Service Squadron 201	1957	Disestablished in 1959.

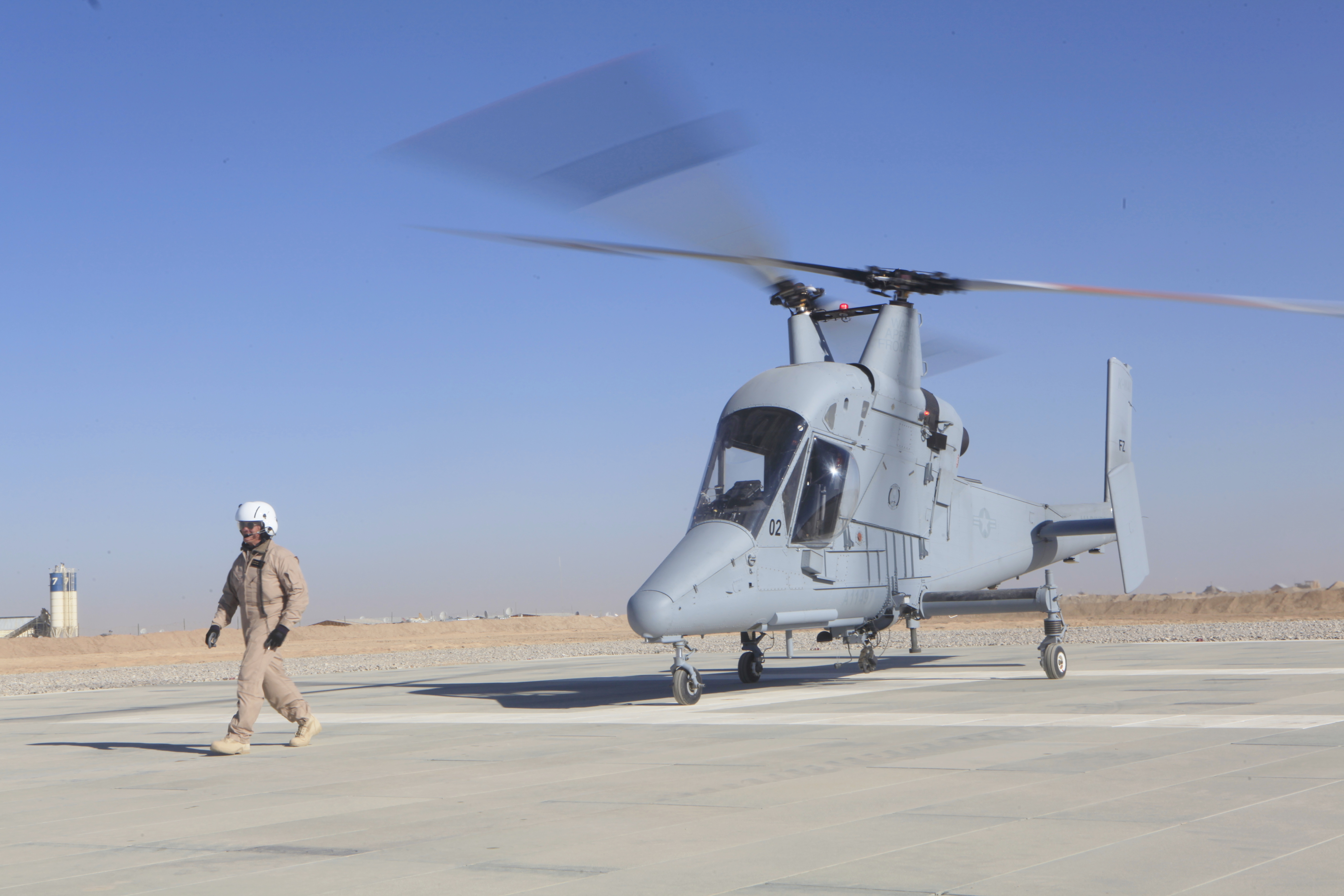
"FZ" tail code can be seen on this CQ-24A unmanned helicopter.

FZ

Assigned to	Assigned on	Notes
VMU-1, Marine Unmanned Aerial Vehicle Squadron 1	January 1987	

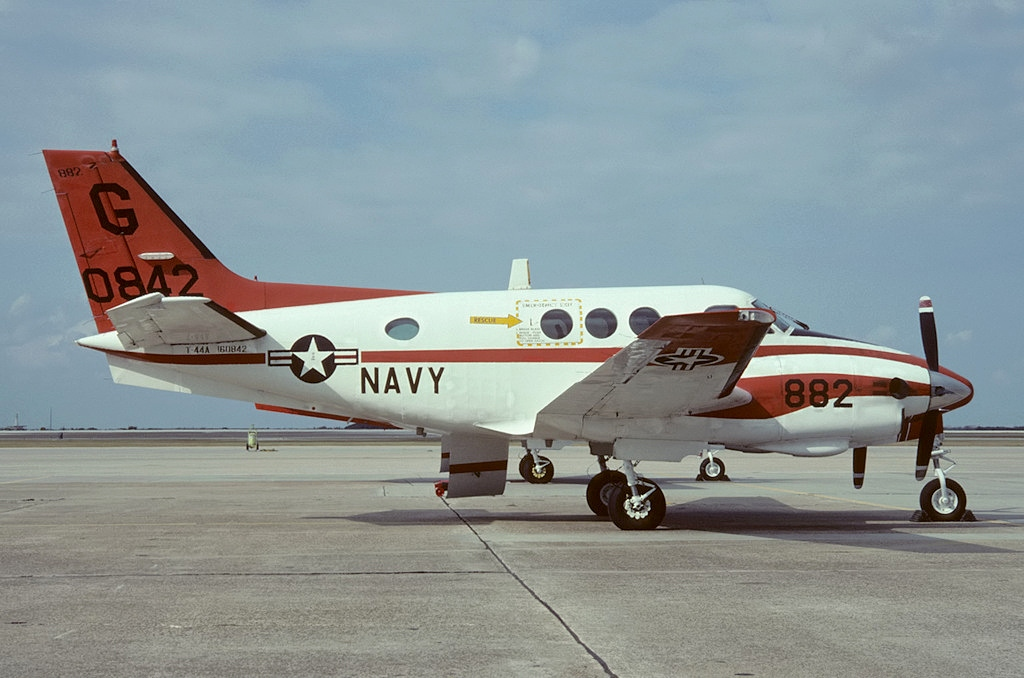
Tail code on this T-44A Pegasus indicates assignment to Training Air Wing 4.

G

Assigned to	Assigned on	Notes
Navy Air Reserve units at NAS Oakland	November 1946	Code changed to "F" in 1948.
CVG-21, Carrier Air Group 21	1955	Tail code changed to "NP" in November 1956.
TW-4, Training Air Wing 4	March 1972	Comprise VT-27, VT-28, VT-31, VT-35.

GA

Assigned to	Assigned on	Notes
VFP-62	1957	Disestablished in January 1968.

GB

Assigned to	Assigned on	Notes
VAP-62	1957	Disestablished in October 1969.

GC

Assigned to	Assigned on	Notes
VF(AW)-4	1957	Disestablished in 1959.
HM-16	1970	Disestablished in January 1987.

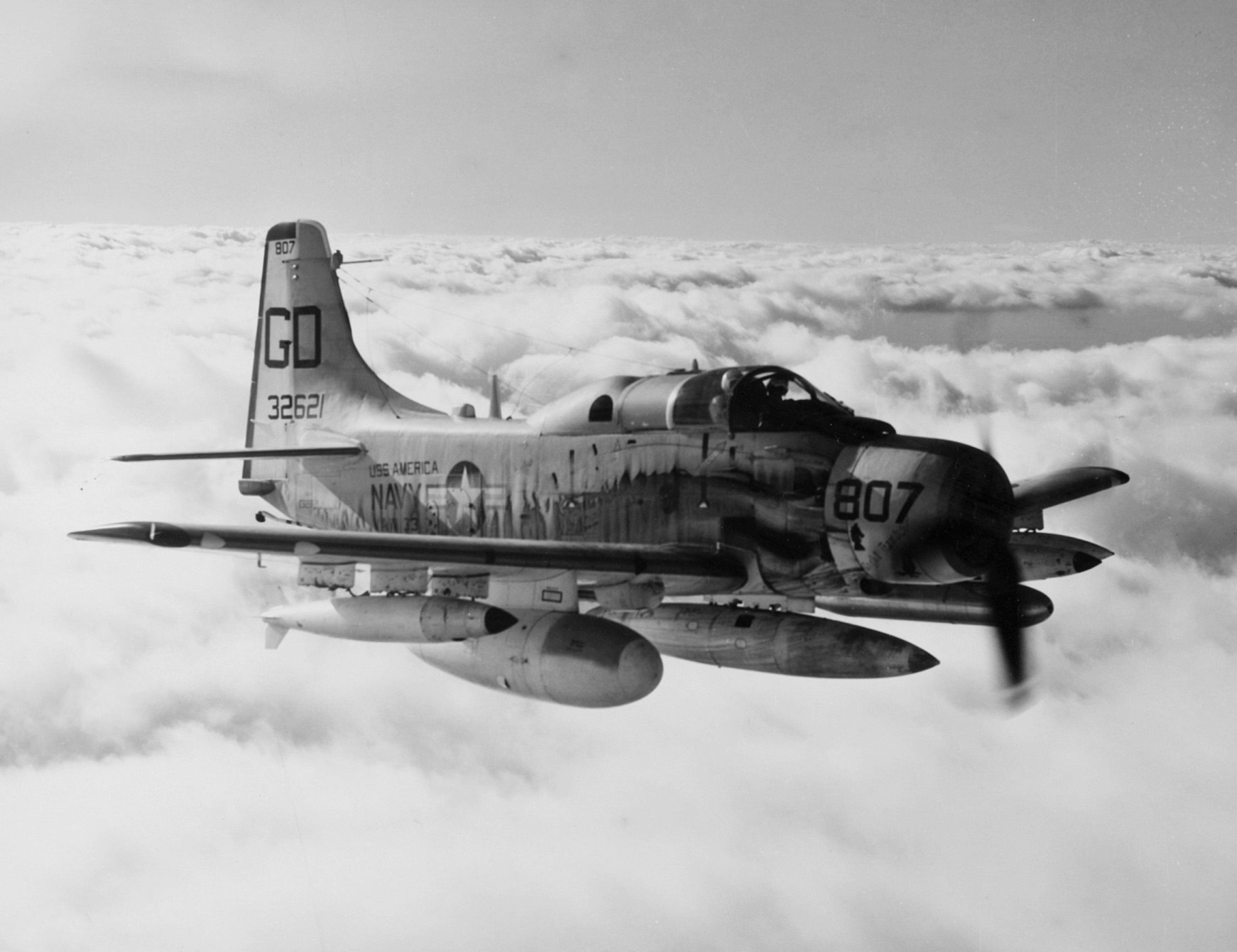
An EA-1F Skyraider of VAW-33 in 1965.

GD

Assigned to	Assigned on	Notes
VA(AW)-33 Subsequently, re-designated VAW-33 and VAQ-33	July 1956	Disestablished in October 1993.
VAQ-34	1984	VAQ-34 shared the tail code with VAQ-33. Disestablishment in October 1993.

GE

Assigned to	Assigned on	Notes
VAW-12 Re-designated RVAW-120	1957	Disestablished in April 1967.

GF

Assigned to	Assigned on	Notes
GMGRU-2, Guided Missile Group 2 Subsequently, re-designated GMSRON-2, VU-8 and VC-8	September 1958	Disestablished.

GH

Assigned to	Assigned on	Notes
VAH-1 Re-designated RVAH-1	1957	Disestablished in January 1979.

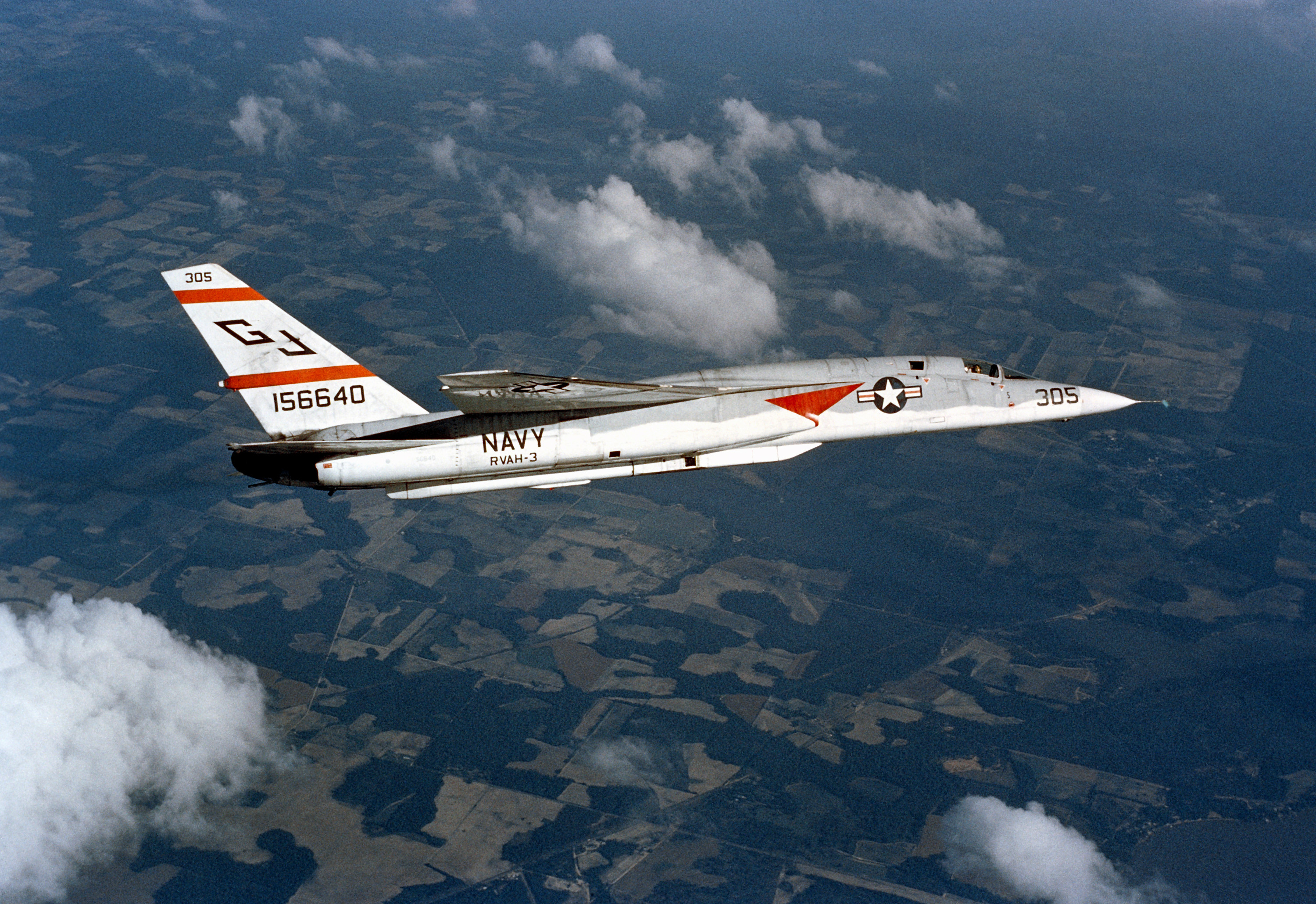
This RA-5C Vigilante of RVAH-3 is seen wearing the squadron's assigned "GJ" tail code.

GJ

Assigned to	Assigned on	Notes
VAH-3 Re-designated RVAH-3	1957	Disestablished in August 1979.

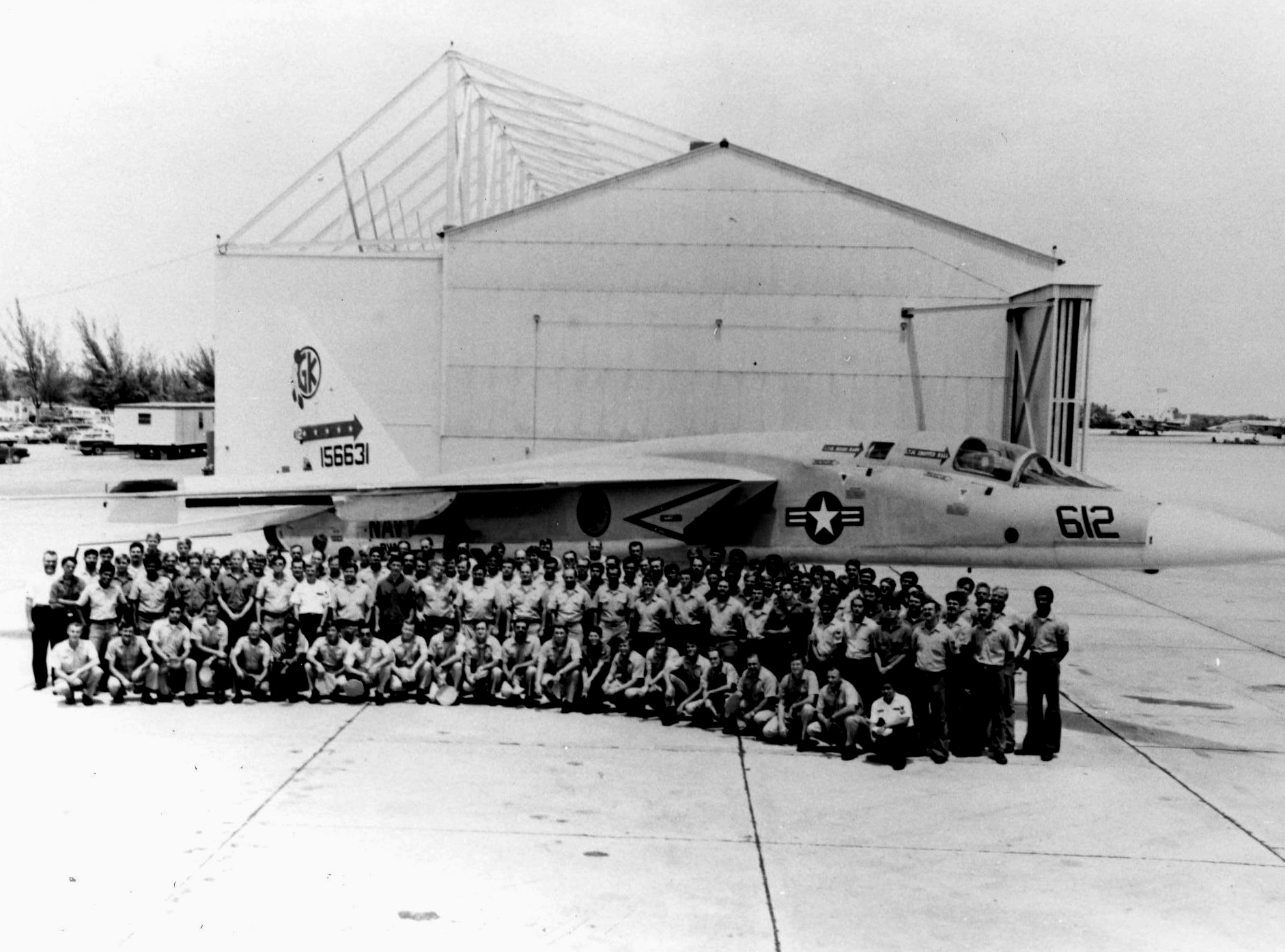
This RA-5C Vigilante of RVAH-5 is seen wearing the squadron's assigned "GK" tail code.

GK

Assigned to	Assigned on	Notes
VAH-5 Re-designated RVAH-5	1957	Disestablished in September 1977.

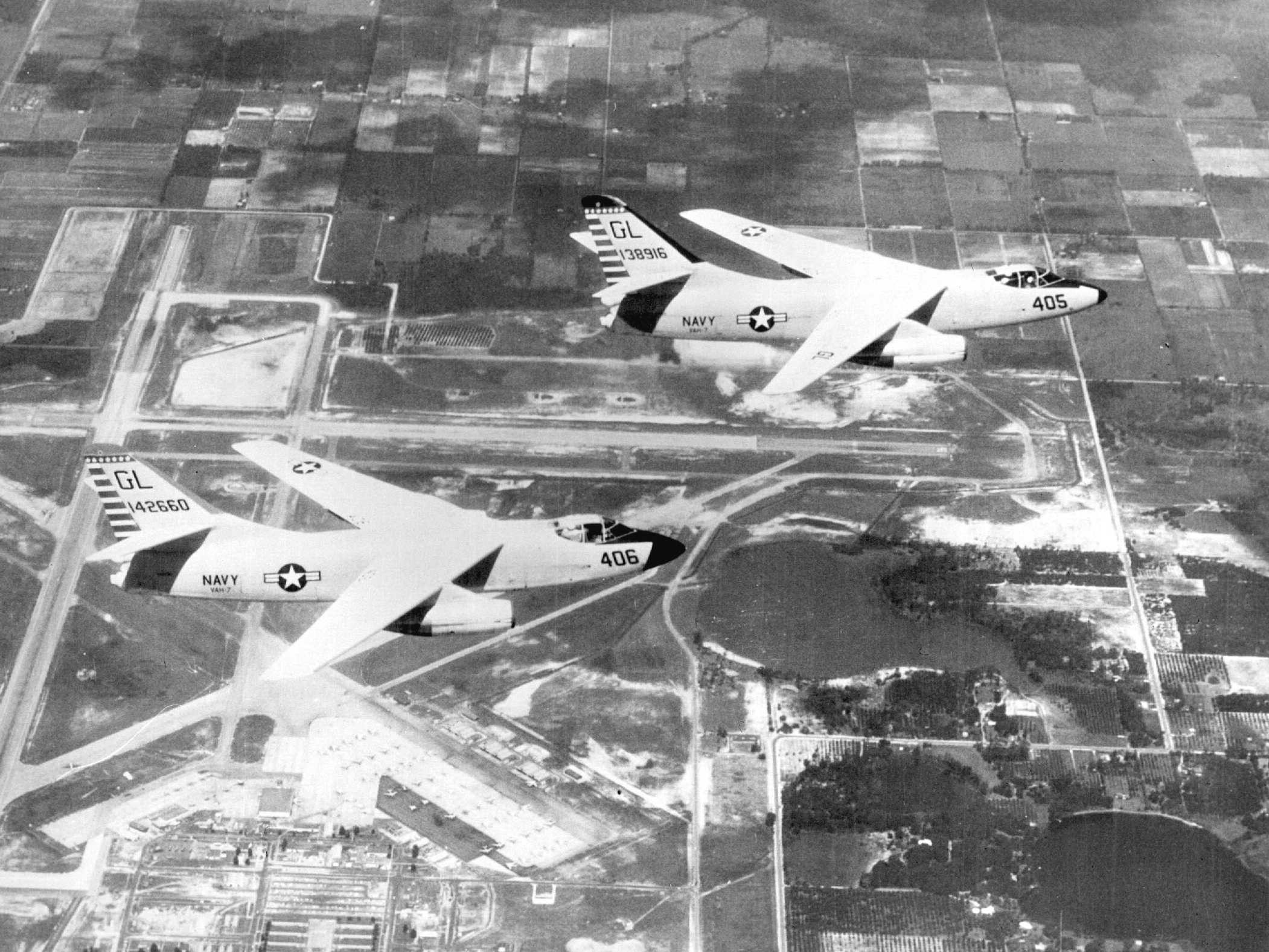
A pair of VAH-7 A3D-2 Skywarriors over NAS Sanford, Florida.

GL

Assigned to	Assigned on	Notes
VAH-7 Re-designated RVAH-7	1957	Disestablished in September 1979.

GM

Assigned to	Assigned on	Notes
VAH-9 Re-designated RVAH-9	1957	Disestablished in September 1977.

GN

Assigned to	Assigned on	Notes
VAH-11 Re-designated RVAH-11	1957	Disestablished in June 1975.

GQ

Assigned to	Assigned on	Notes
VAH-14 Re-designated RVAH-14	February 1968	Disestablished in May 1976.

GP

Assigned to	Assigned on	Notes
VAH-15	January 1958	Disestablished in February 1959.
VAH-13 Re-designated RVAH-13	January 1961	Disestablished in June 1976.
RVAH-12	July 1971	Disestablished in July 1979.

GR

Assigned to	Assigned on	Notes
RVAH-13	July 1971	Disestablished in June 1976.
VMGRT-253	October 1986	Disestablished in September 2006.

GS

Assigned to	Assigned on	Notes
RVAH-6	July 1971	Disestablished in October 1978.

GX

Assigned to	Assigned on	Notes
HMT-204 Re-designated VMMT-204	May 1972	

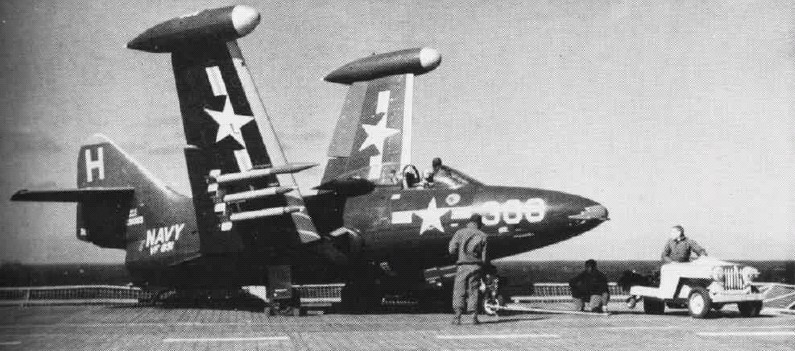
The "H" on this F9F-2 Panther indicates assignment to CVG-15.

H

Assigned to	Assigned on	Notes
USS Lexington (CV-16)	July 1945	
USS Philippine Sea (CV-47)	8 January 1946, U.S. Navy Letter FF12-5	Only in effect until December 1946.
Navy Air Reserve units at NAS Miami	November 1946	The "H" code issued to this NAS was a controlled duplicate of the same code letter given to CVG-15. Code changed to "6H" in 1956.
Navy Air Reserve units at NAS Niagara Falls	November 1946	Code changed to "7H" in 1956.
CVG-15, Carrier Air Group 15	1951	Tail code changed to "NL" in November 1956.

HA

Assigned to	Assigned on	Notes
VP-HL-4 Subsequently, re-designated VP-24 and VA(HM)-13	July 1956	Tail code changed to "LR" in 1957.
HS-1	1957	Disestablished in 1997.

HB

Assigned to	Assigned on	Notes
VP-HL-6 Re-designated VP-26	7 November 1946, U.S. Navy Letter ACL 156-46	Tail code changed to "EB" in July 1950.
VP-11	May 1952	Tail code changed to "LE" in 1957.
HS-3 Re-designated HSC-9	1957	

HC

Assigned to	Assigned on	Notes
VP-HL-11 Re-designated VP-21	7 November 1946, U.S. Navy Letter ACL 156-46	Tail code changed to "LH" in 1957.
HS-5	1957	Re-designated HSC-5 in 2014.
HC-4	May 1983	Disestablished in September 2007.

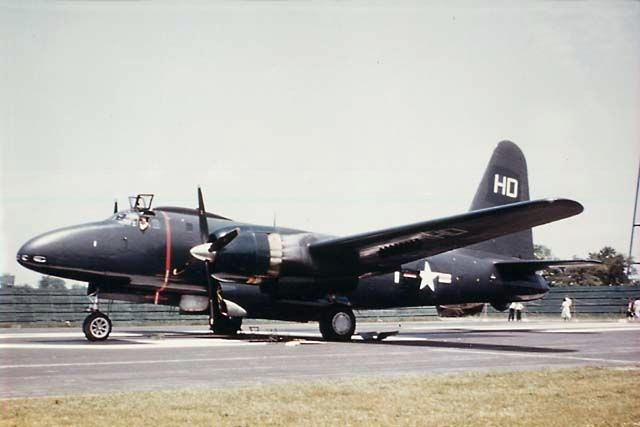
A P2V-3 Neptune carries the tail code of VP-8.

HD

Assigned to	Assigned on	Notes
VP-ML-8 Re-designated VP-8	4 August 1948, U.S. Navy Letter ACL 69-48	Tail code changed to "LC" in 1957.
HS-7 Subsequently, re-designated HSC-7	1957	

HE

Assigned to	Assigned on	Notes
VP-HL-7 Re-designated VP-7	4 August 1948, U.S. Navy Letter ACL 69-48	Tail code changed to "LB" in 1957.
HS-9	1957	Disestablished in October 1968.

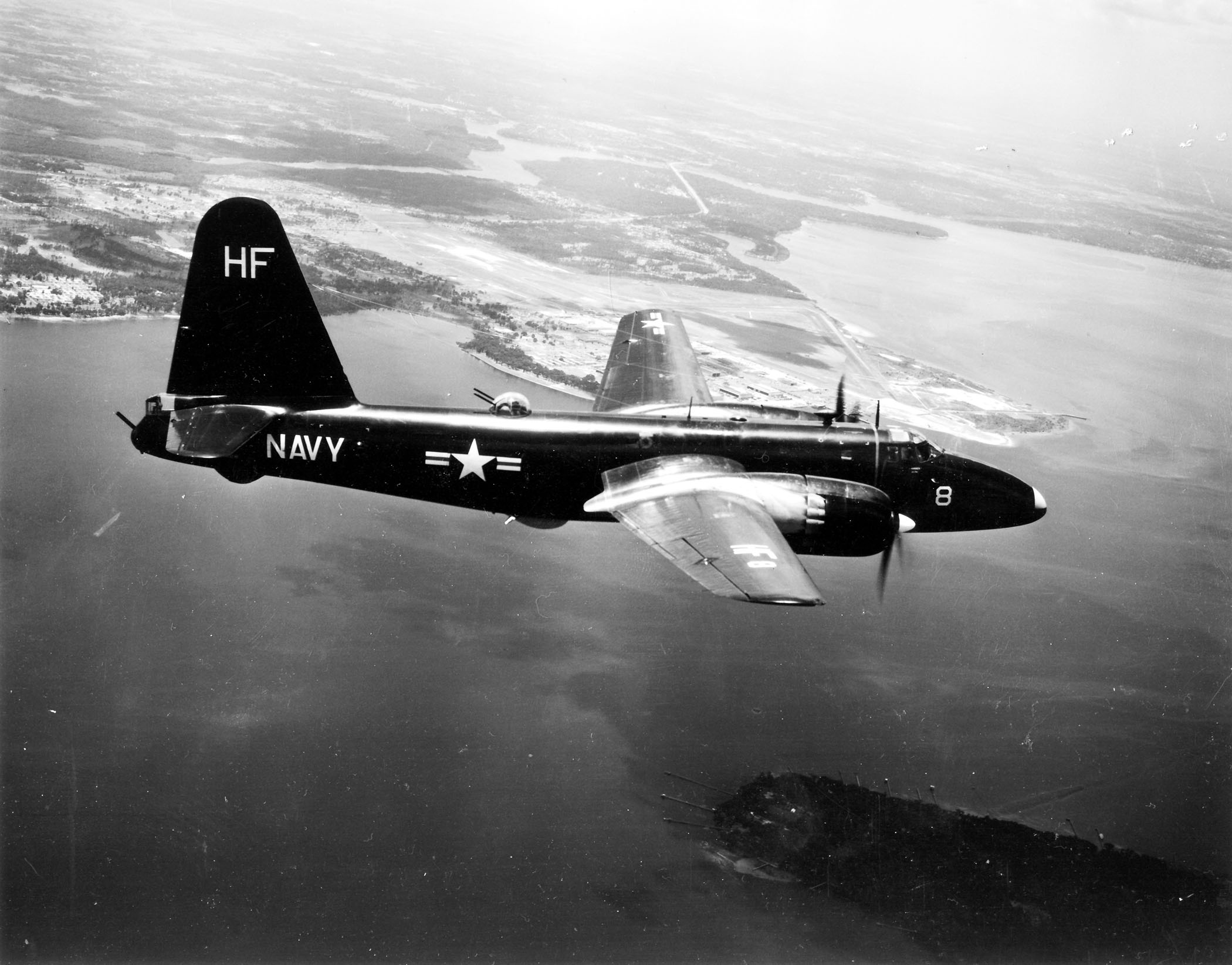
A P2V-2 Neptune carries the tail code of VP-18.

HF

Assigned to	Assigned on	Notes
Fighter units of Navy Air Reserve at NAS Niagara Falls and NAS Miami	November 1946	A very short-lived assignment.
VP-861 Re-designated VP-18	September 1950	Tail code changed to "LG" in 1957.
HS-11	1957	
HMLA-269	February 1971	

HG

Assigned to	Assigned on	Notes
FAWTULANT, Fleet All-Weather Training Unit, Atlantic	1957	Merged with VF-101.

HH

Assigned to	Assigned on	Notes
USS Intrepid (CV-11)	8 January 1946, U.S. Navy Letter FF12-5	Only in effect until December 1946.
VP-16	May 1946	Tail code changed to "LF" in 1957.
HMH-366	September 1994	Deactivated in October 2000, reactivated in September 2008.

HJ

Assigned to	Assigned on	Notes
FAETULANT, Fleet Airborne Electronics Training Unit, Atlantic	1957	Disestablished in 1957.

HK

Assigned to	Assigned on	Notes
VP-10	March 1951	Tail code changed to "LD" in 1957.
HATULANT, Heavy Attack Training Unit, Atlantic	1957	Disestablished.
HSL-40 Re-designated HSM-40	October 1985	

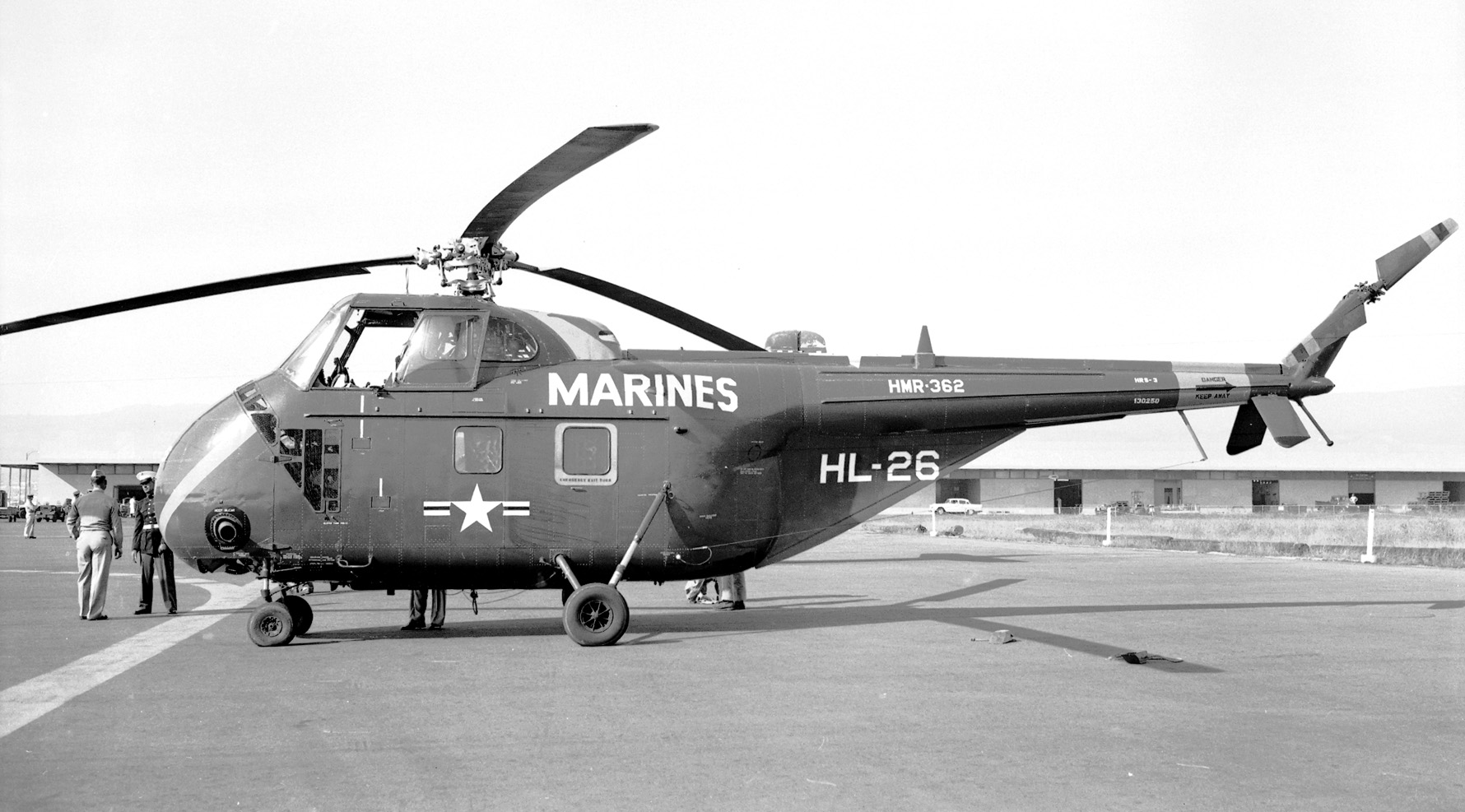
An HRS-3 helicopter with HMR-362 tail code.

HL

Assigned to	Assigned on	Notes
HMR-362 Re-designated HMR(L)-362	April 1952	Tail code changed to "YL" in 1957.
SWULANT, Special Weapons Unit, Atlantic	1956	Disestablished in 1957.
VQ-4	July 1968	

HM

Assigned to	Assigned on	Notes
HMR-261 Re-designated HMR(L)-261	April 1951	Tail code changed to "EM" in 1957.

HN

Assigned to	Assigned on	Notes
HMR-361	February 1952	
HSL-42	October 1984	

HP

Assigned to	Assigned on	Notes
HMR-163 Re-designated HMR(L)-163	1955	Tail code changed to "YP" in 1957.
HMHT-401	January 1970	Disestablished in May 1972.
HSL-44	October 1984	Disestablished.

HQ

Assigned to	Assigned on	Notes
HSL-46 Re-designated HSM-46	April 1988	Disestablished.

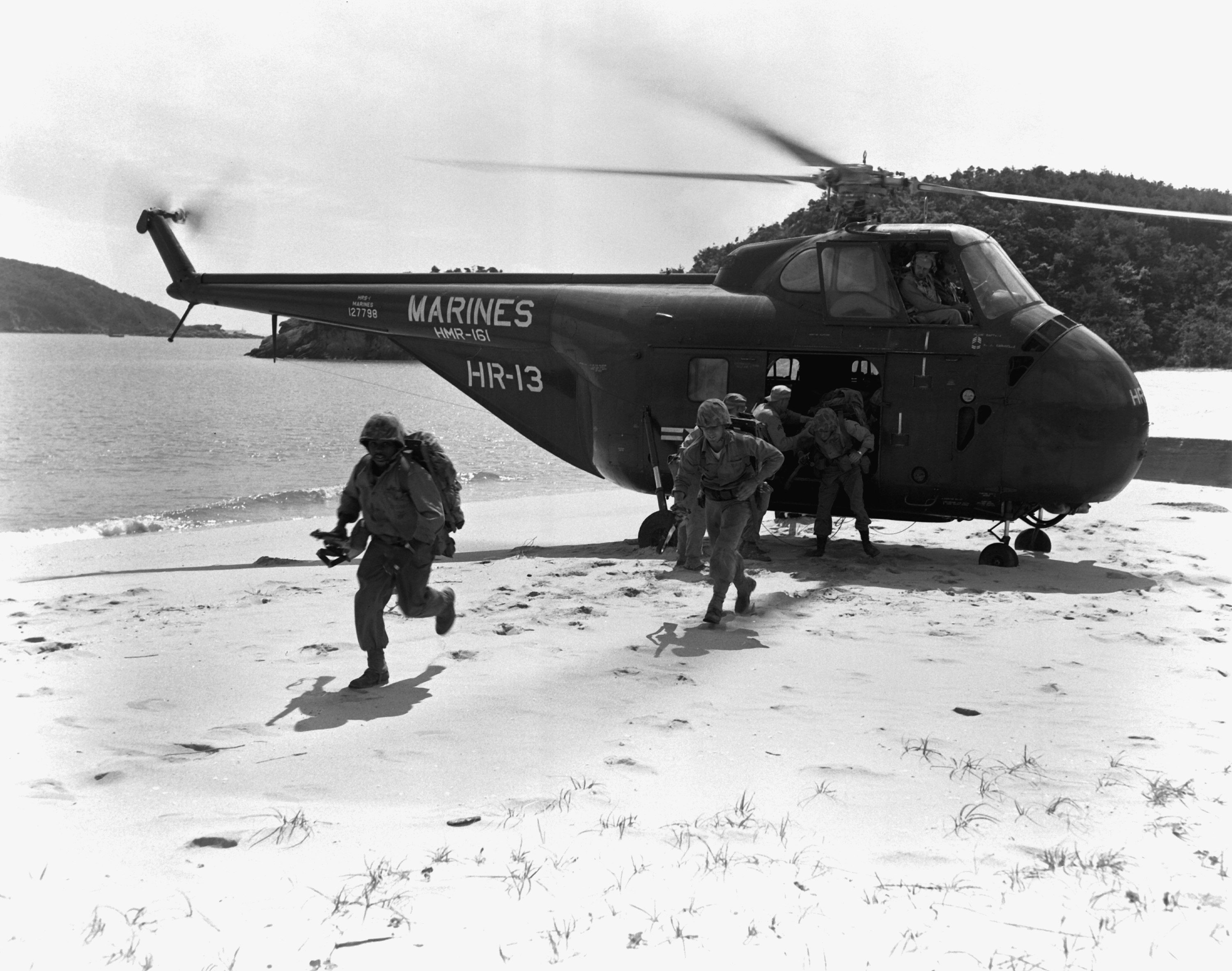
"HR" tail code of this HRS-1 indicates assignment to HMR-161.

HR

Assigned to	Assigned on	Notes
HMR-161 Re-designated HMR(L)-161	January 1951	Tail code changed to "YR" in 1957.
H&MS-40, Headquarters and Maintenance Squadron 40	July 1971	Disestablished in May 1972.
HSL-48 Re-designated HSM-48	September 1989	Disestablished.

HS

Assigned to	Assigned on	Notes
HMR-162 Re-designated HMR(L)-162	June 1951	Tail code changed to "YS" in 1957.

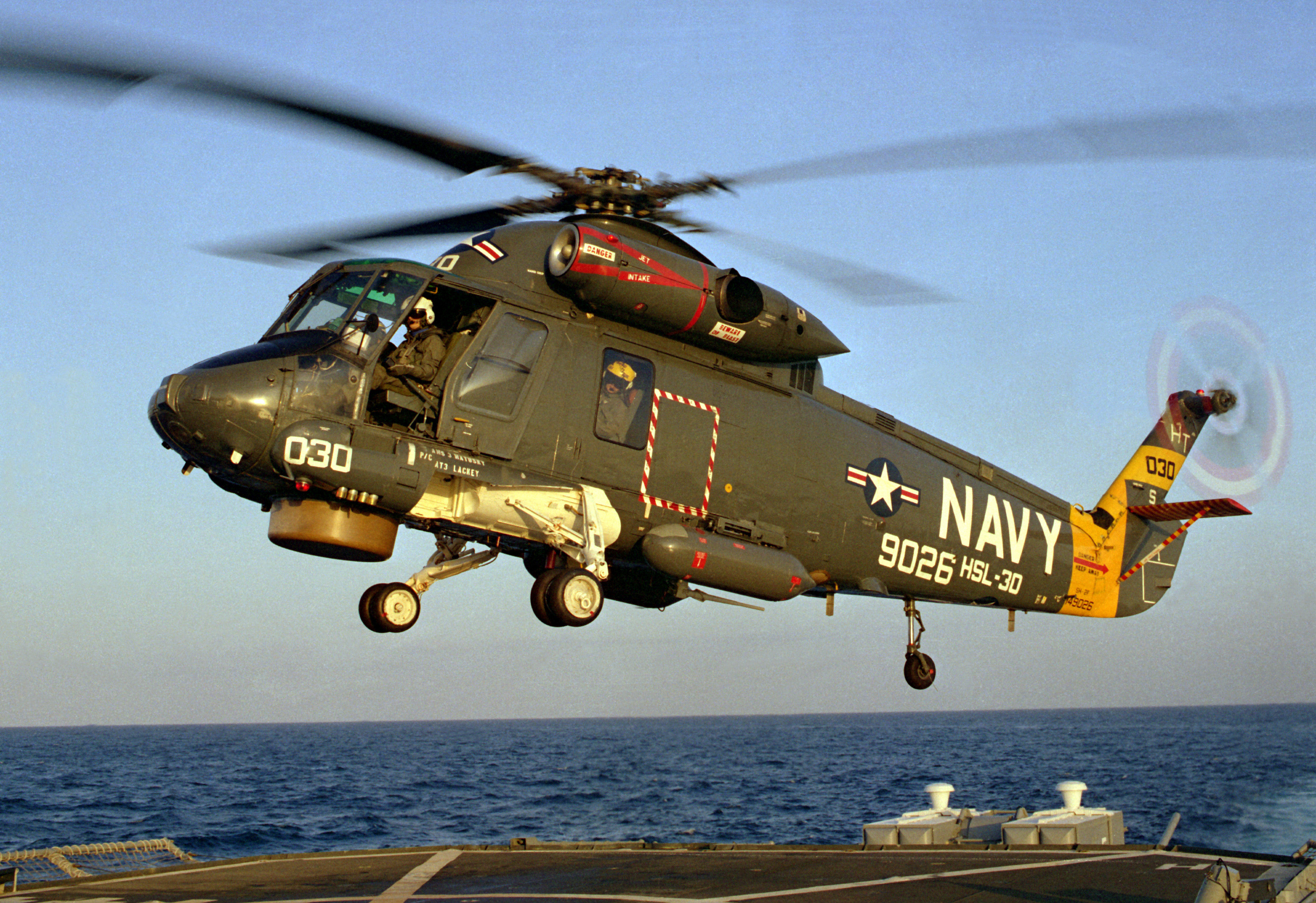
A Kaman SH-2F Sea Sprite of HSL-30.

HT

Assigned to	Assigned on	Notes
HMR-163	29 July 1950, U.S. Navy Letter ACL 43-50	Tail code changed to "HP" in 1952.
HMR-262 Re-designated HMR(L)-262	1952	Tail code changed to "ET" in 1957.
HU-4 re-designated HC-4 re-designated HSL-30	July 1960	Disestablished 30 September 1993.

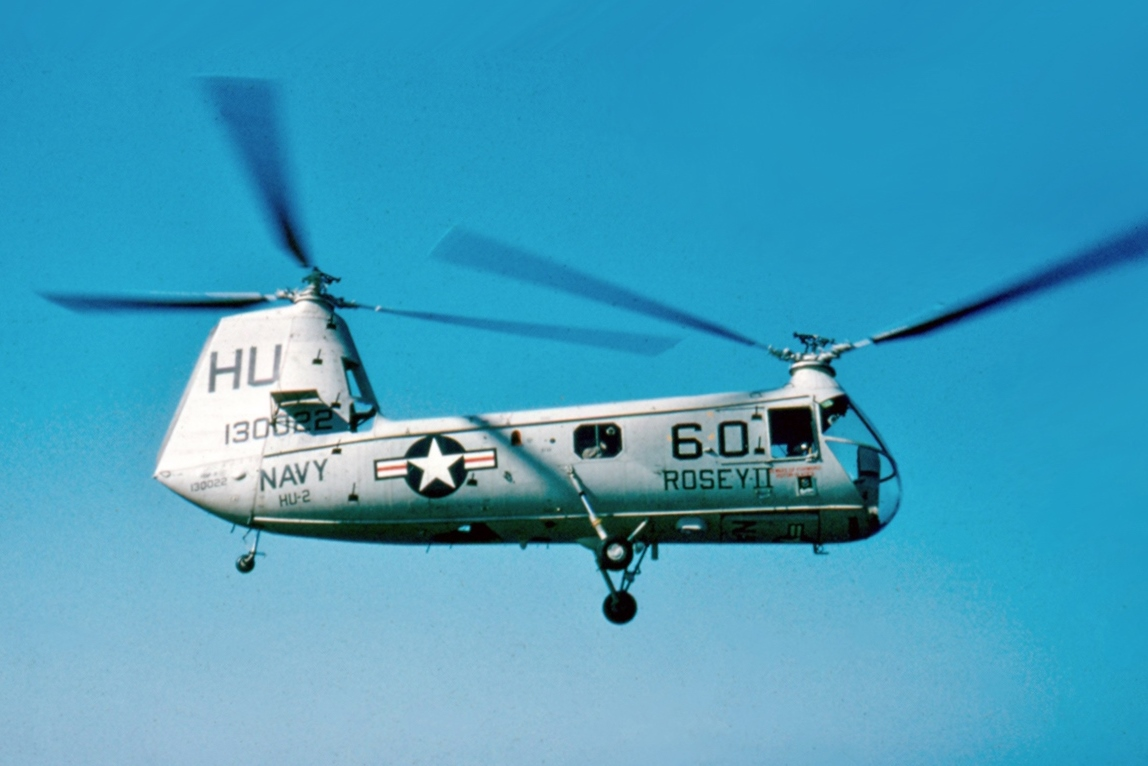
This HUP-2 helicopter displays its squadron's "HU" code.

HU

Assigned to	Assigned on	Notes
HU-2 Re-designated HC-2	April 1948	Disestablished in September 1977.
HC-2(2nd) Re-designated HSC-2	April 1987	

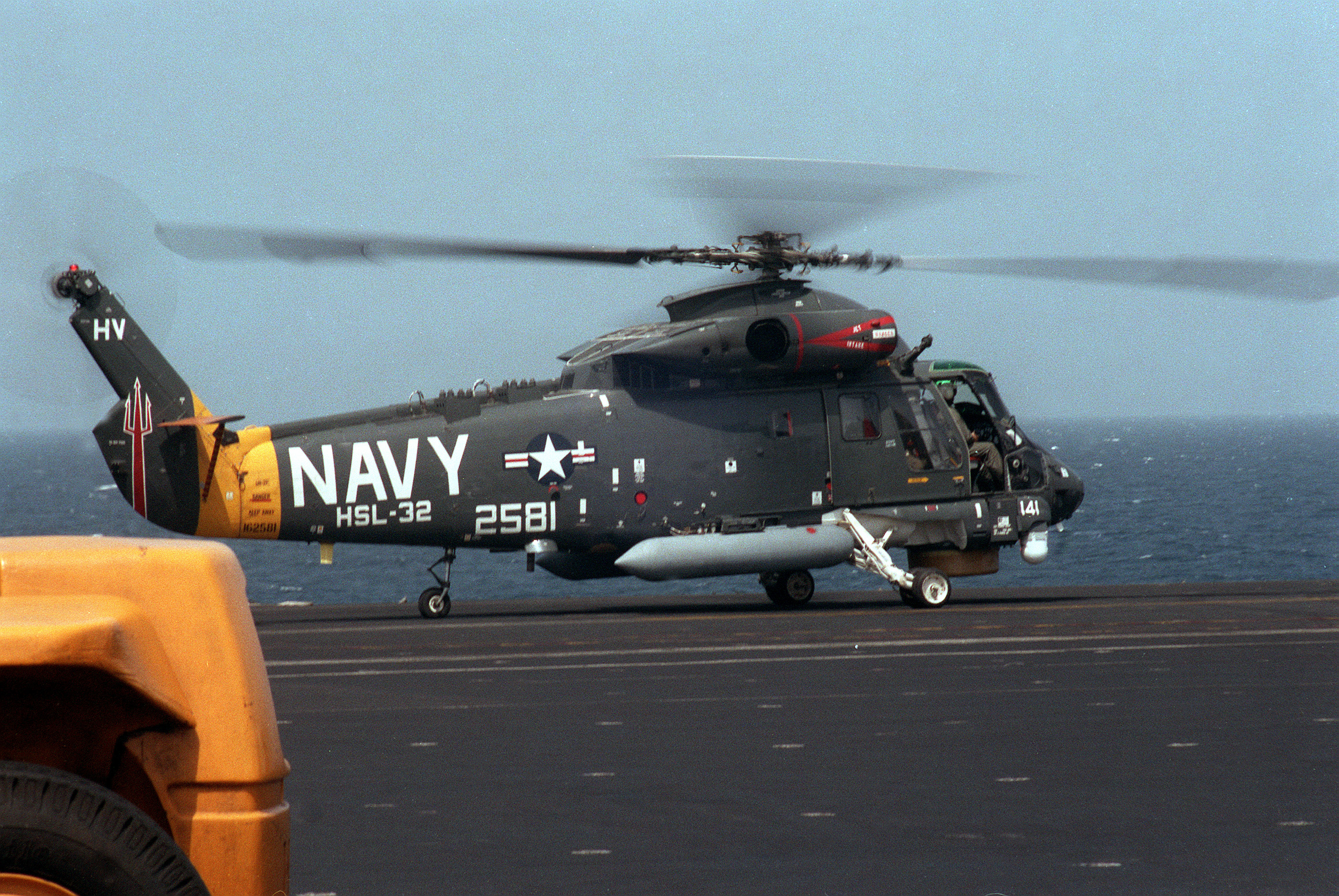
A Kaman SH-2F Sea Sprite of HSL-32.

HV

Assigned to	Assigned on	Notes
HS-2	March 1952	Code changed to "SK" in 1957.
HSL-32	August 1973	Disestablished.

HW

Assigned to	Assigned on	Notes
ATU-601		
HS-3	June 1952	Code changed to "HB" in 1957.
HC-6	September 1967	
HSC-26	2000s	

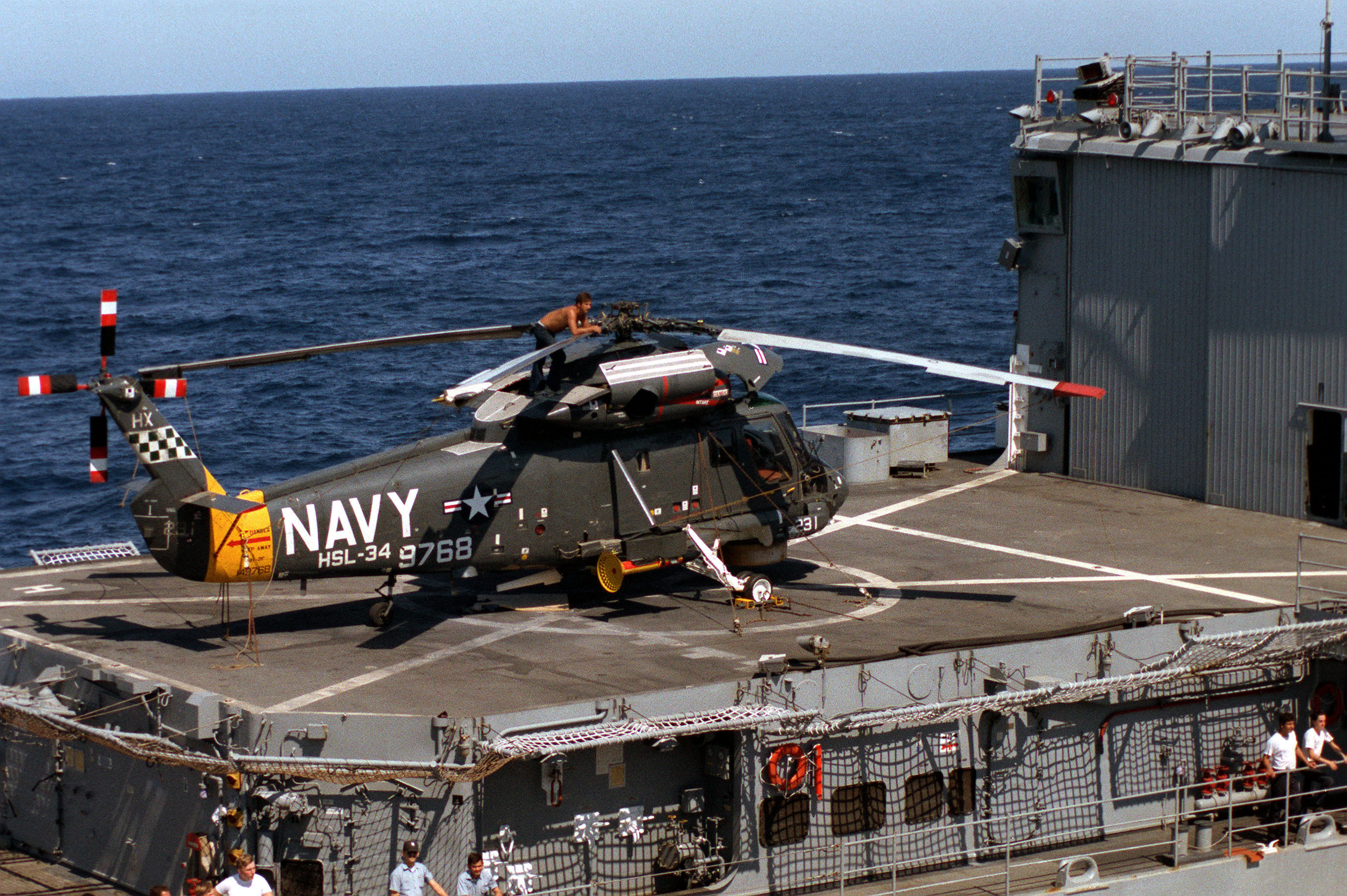
A Kaman SH-2F Sea Sprite of HSL-34.

HX

Assigned to	Assigned on	Notes
HSL-34	September 1974	Disestablished.
HX-21		

HY

Assigned to	Assigned on	Notes
HSL-36	September 1975	Disestablished in September 1992.

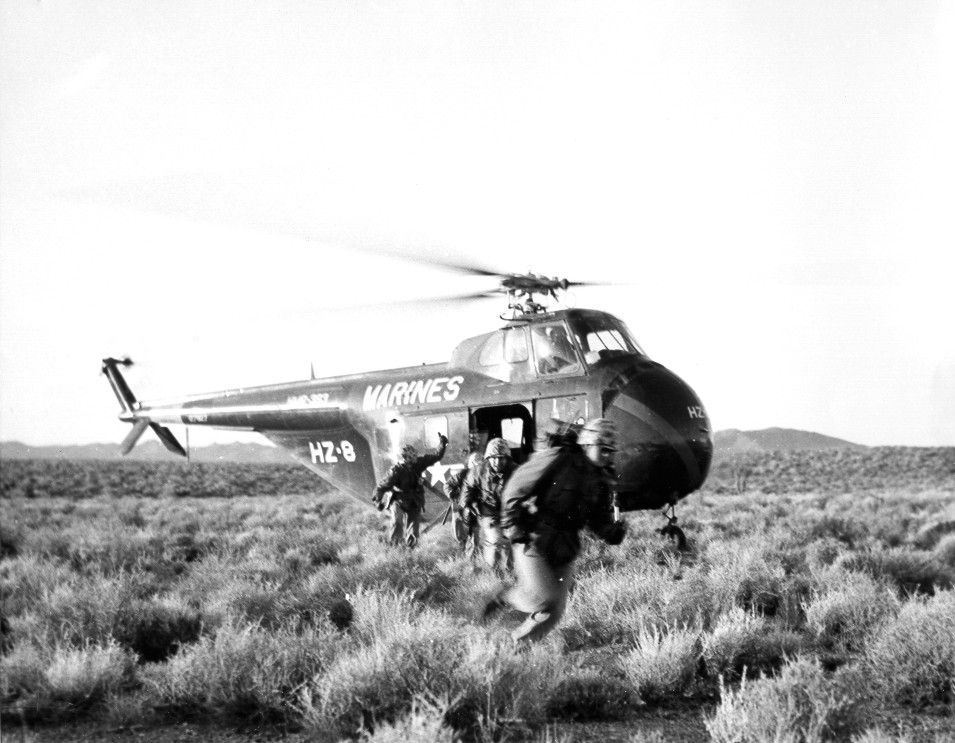
"HZ" code on this Sikorsky HRS helicopter indicates assignment to HMR-363.

HZ

Assigned to	Assigned on	Notes
HMR-363 Re-designated HMR(L)-363	June 1952	Tail code changed to "YZ" in 1957.

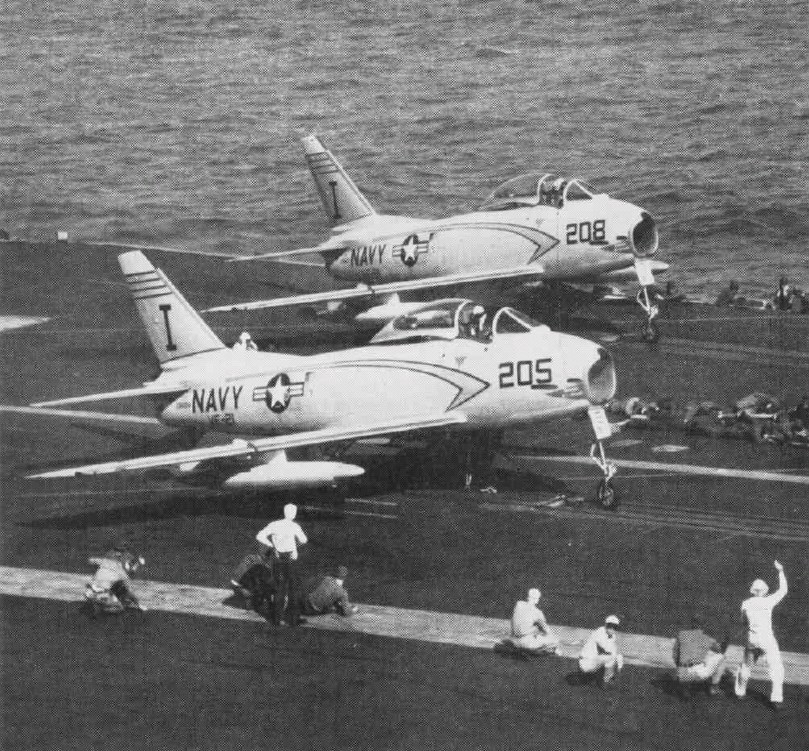
A pair of FJ-2 Fury fighters from VF-21 display the ATG-181 tail code.

I

Assigned to	Assigned on	Notes
Navy Air Reserve units at NAS Gross Ile	November 1946	Code changed to "7Y" in 1956.
ATG-181, Air Task Group 181	1953	Tail code changed to "AM" in November 1956.

IF

Assigned to	Assigned on	Notes
Fighter units of Navy Air Reserve at NAS Gross Ile	November 1946	A very short-lived assignment.

IL

Assigned to	Assigned on	Notes
HMR-263	June 1952	Tail code changed to "EG" in September 1958.

IP

Assigned to	Assigned on	Notes
Patrol units of Navy Air Reserve at NAS Gross Ile	November 1946	A very short-lived assignment.

IT

Assigned to	Assigned on	Notes
Training units of Navy Air Reserve at NAS Gross Ile	November 1946	A very short-lived assignment.

J

Assigned to	Assigned on	Notes
ATG-201, Air Task Group 201	1955	Tail code changed to "AP" in November 1956.

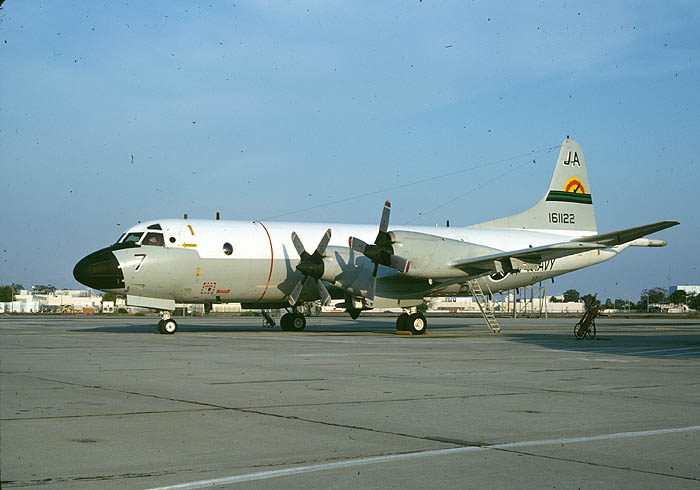
"JA" tail code of Test and Evaluation Squadron 1 is seen on this P-3C Orion.

JA

Assigned to	Assigned on	Notes
VX-1 Re-designated VXE-1	1957	

JB

Assigned to	Assigned on	Notes
VX-2	1957	Disestablished in 1958.
VXN-8, Oceanographic Development Squadron 8	July 1965	Disestablished in October 1993.

JC

Assigned to	Assigned on	Notes
VX-3	1957	Disestablished in March 1960.

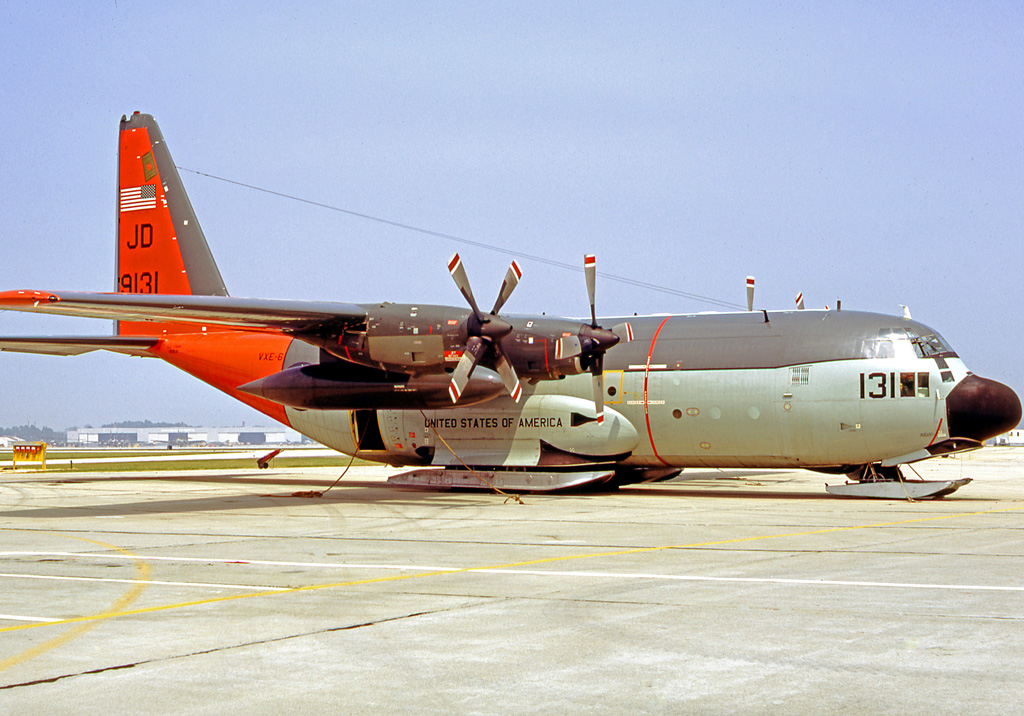
Lockheed LC-130R Hercules of VXE-6 in 1974.

JD

Assigned to	Assigned on	Notes
VX-6 Re-designated VXE-6, Antarctic Deployment Squadron 6	1957	Disestablished in March 1999.

JE

Assigned to	Assigned on	Notes
VU-2 Re-designated VC-2	1957	Disestablished in September 1980.

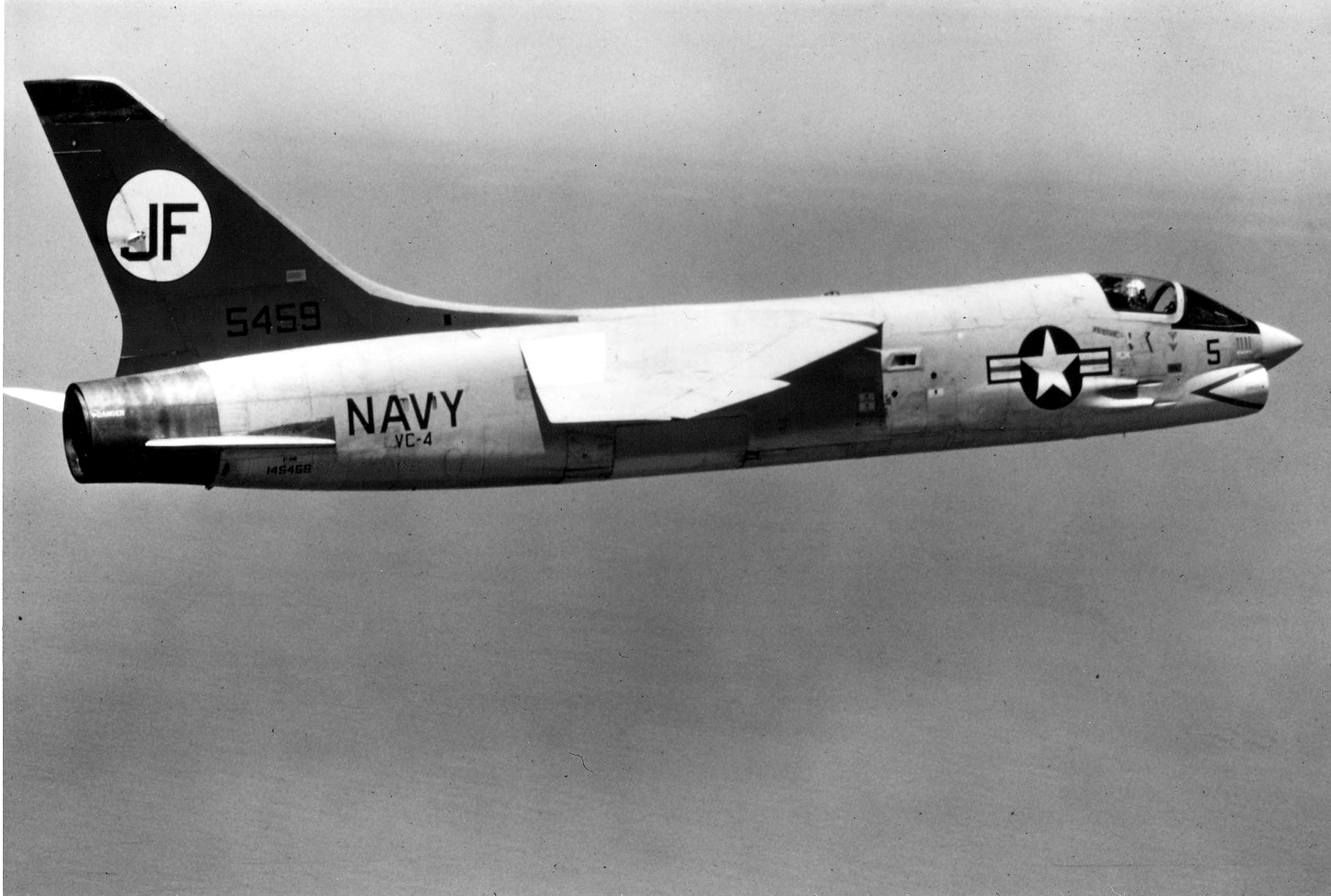
An F-8L Crusader of Composite Squadron 4 in flight.

JF

Assigned to	Assigned on	Notes
VC-4	July 1971	Disestablished in April 1971.

JG

Assigned to	Assigned on	Notes
VU-6 Re-designated VC-6	1957	Disestablished in August 2008.

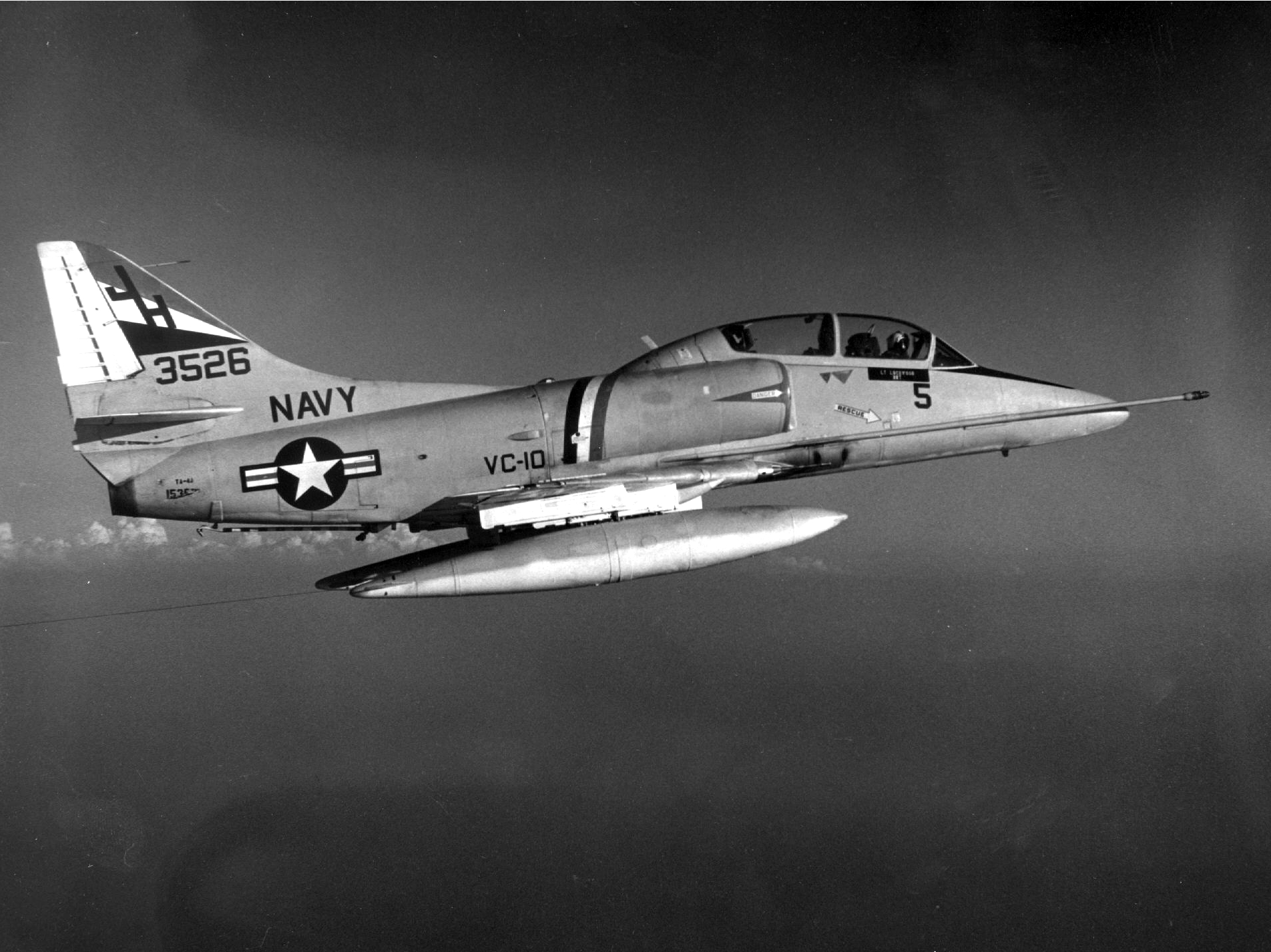
Composite Squadron Ten "JH" tail code is displayed on this TA-4J Skyhawk.

JH

Assigned to	Assigned on	Notes
VU-10 Re-designated VC-10	1957	Disestablished in August 1993.

JK

Assigned to	Assigned on	Notes
VR-1	1957	Disestablished in September 1978.
VRC-40	July 1960	

JL

Assigned to	Assigned on	Notes
VR-22	1957	

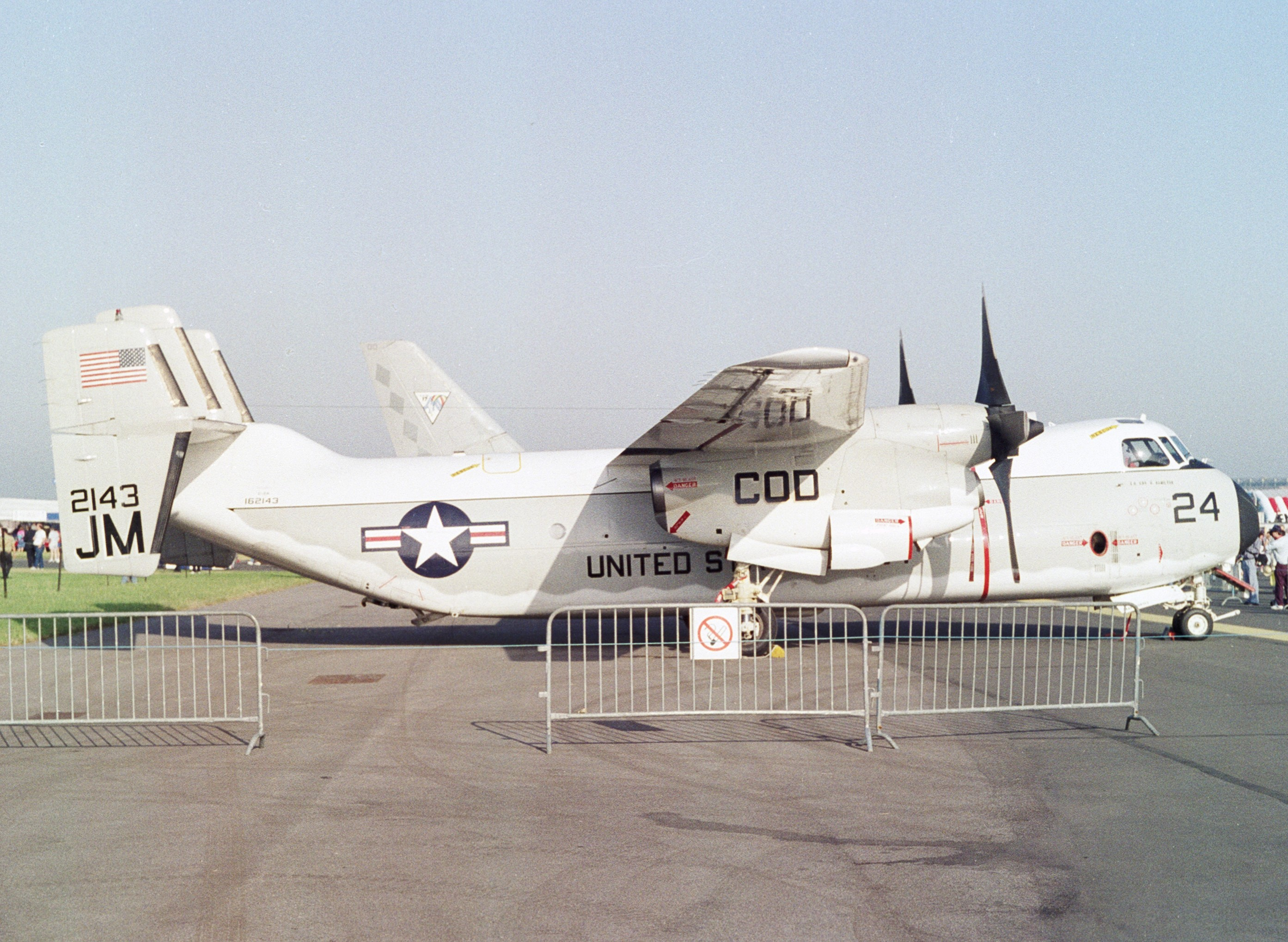
A C-2A Greyhound from VR-24.

JM

Assigned to	Assigned on	Notes
VR-24	1957	

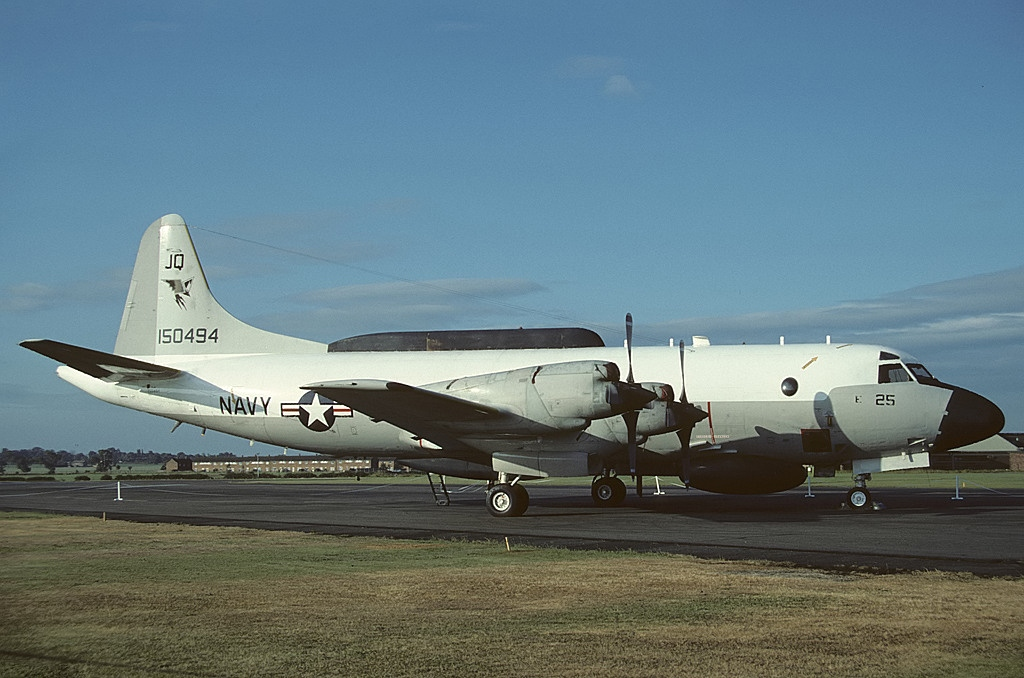
"JQ", the tail code of Fleet Air Reconnaissance Squadron Two, adorns this EP-3E Orion.

JQ

Assigned to	Assigned on	Notes
VQ-2	September 1955	

JR

Assigned to	Assigned on	Notes
VR-6	1957	
VR-48	October 1980	Disestablished 09/07/2012

JS

Assigned to	Assigned on	Notes
VR-50	July 1971	
VR-46	March 1981	

JT

Assigned to	Assigned on	Notes
VR-53	July 1970	Tail code changed to "RT" in July 1972
VR-52	July 1972	

JU

Assigned to	Assigned on	Notes
VR-56	July 1976	

JV

Assigned to	Assigned on	Notes
VR-58	November 1977	

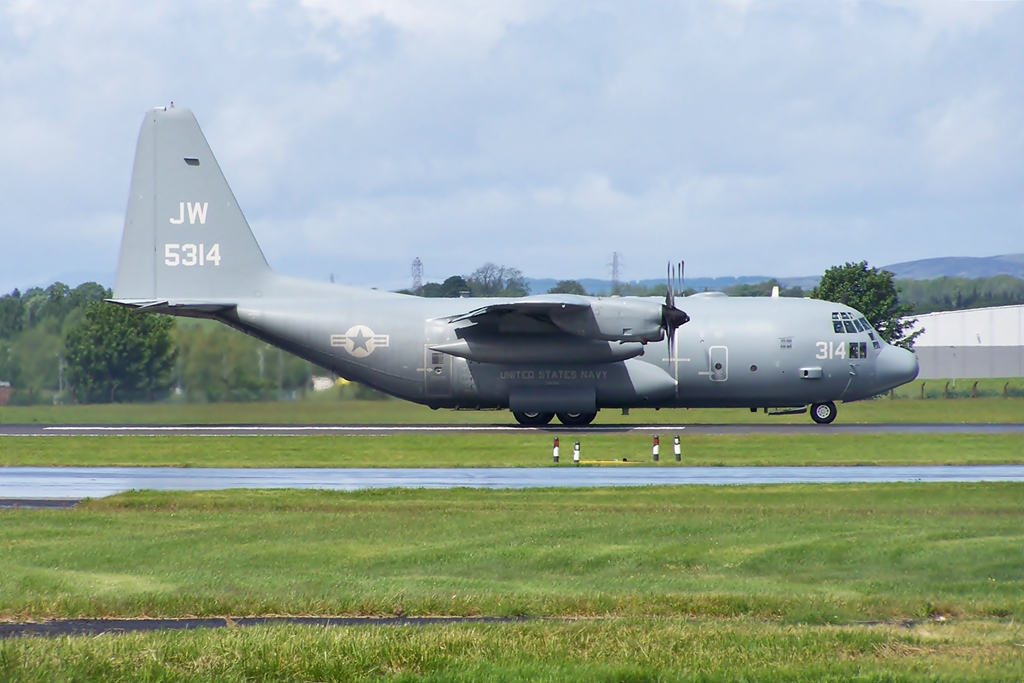
A C-130T Hercules of VR-62.

JW

Assigned to	Assigned on	Notes
VR-62	July 1985	

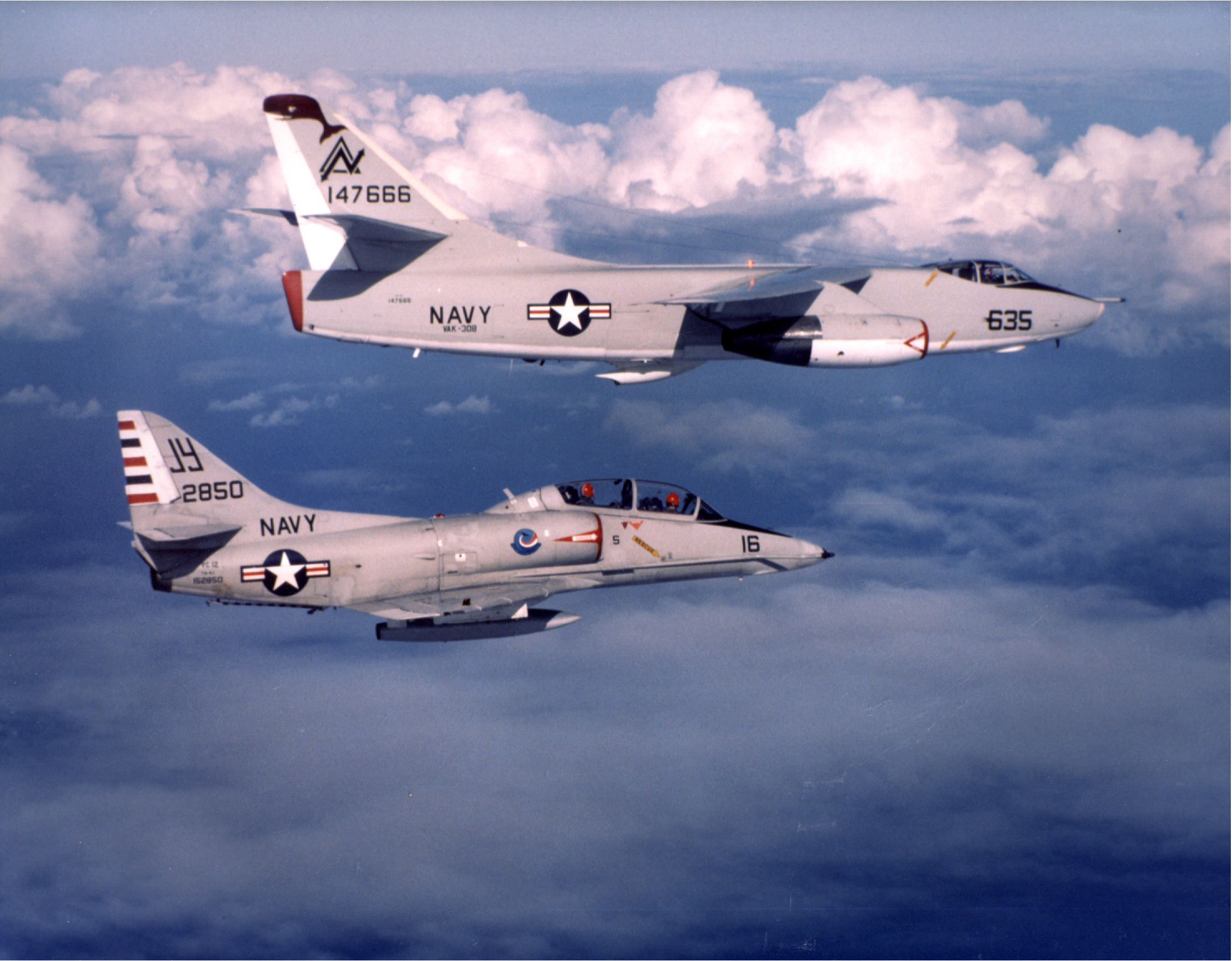
A TA-4J Skyhawk (BuNo 152850) of Composite Squadron 12 carries the unit's "JY" code.

JY

Assigned to	Assigned on	Notes
VC-12 Re-designated VFC-12	September 1973	The third squadron known as VC-12. The current tail code of VFC-12 is "AF".

K

Assigned to	Assigned on	Notes
USS Langley (CVL-27)	July 1945	
USS Kearsarge (CV-33)	8 January 1946, U.S. Navy Letter FF12-5	
CVG-3, Carrier Air Group 3	12 December 1946, U.S. Navy Letter ACL 165-46	Tail code changed to "AC" in November 1956.
Navy Air Reserve units at NAS Olathe	November 1946	The "K" code issued to this NAS was a controlled duplicate of the same code letter given to CVG-3. Code changed to "7K" in 1956.

KA

Assigned to	Assigned on	Notes
ATU-200, Advanced Training Unit 200	Circa 1950	

KB

Assigned to	Assigned on	Notes
ATU-100, Advanced Training Unit 100	Circa 1950	
VMFAT-201	April 1968	Disestablished in September 1974.

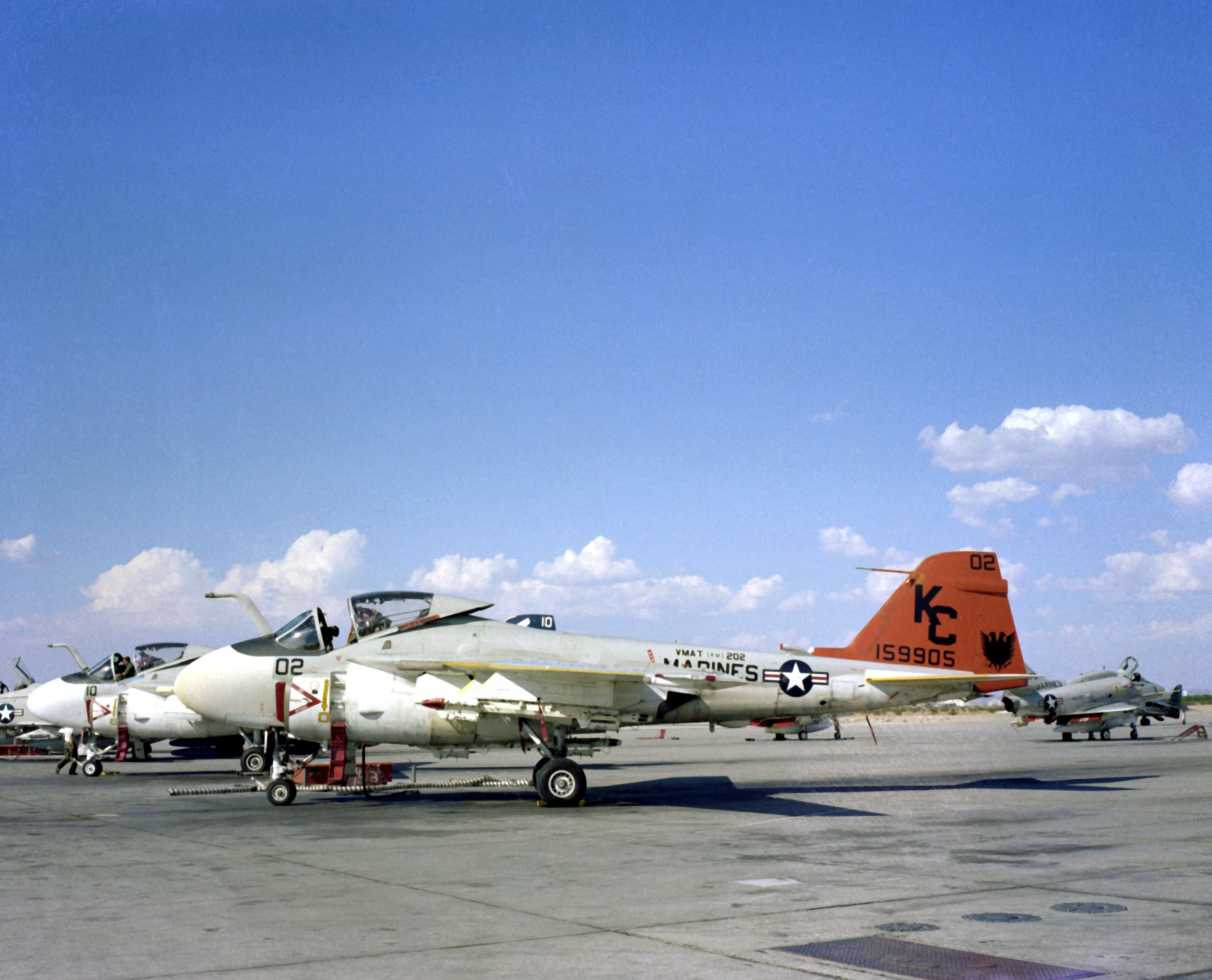
An A-6E Intruder from Marine all-weather attack training squadron VMAT(AW)-202.

KC

Assigned to	Assigned on	Notes
ATU-400, Advanced Training Unit 400		
VMAT(AW)-202	January 1968	Disestablished in 1990.

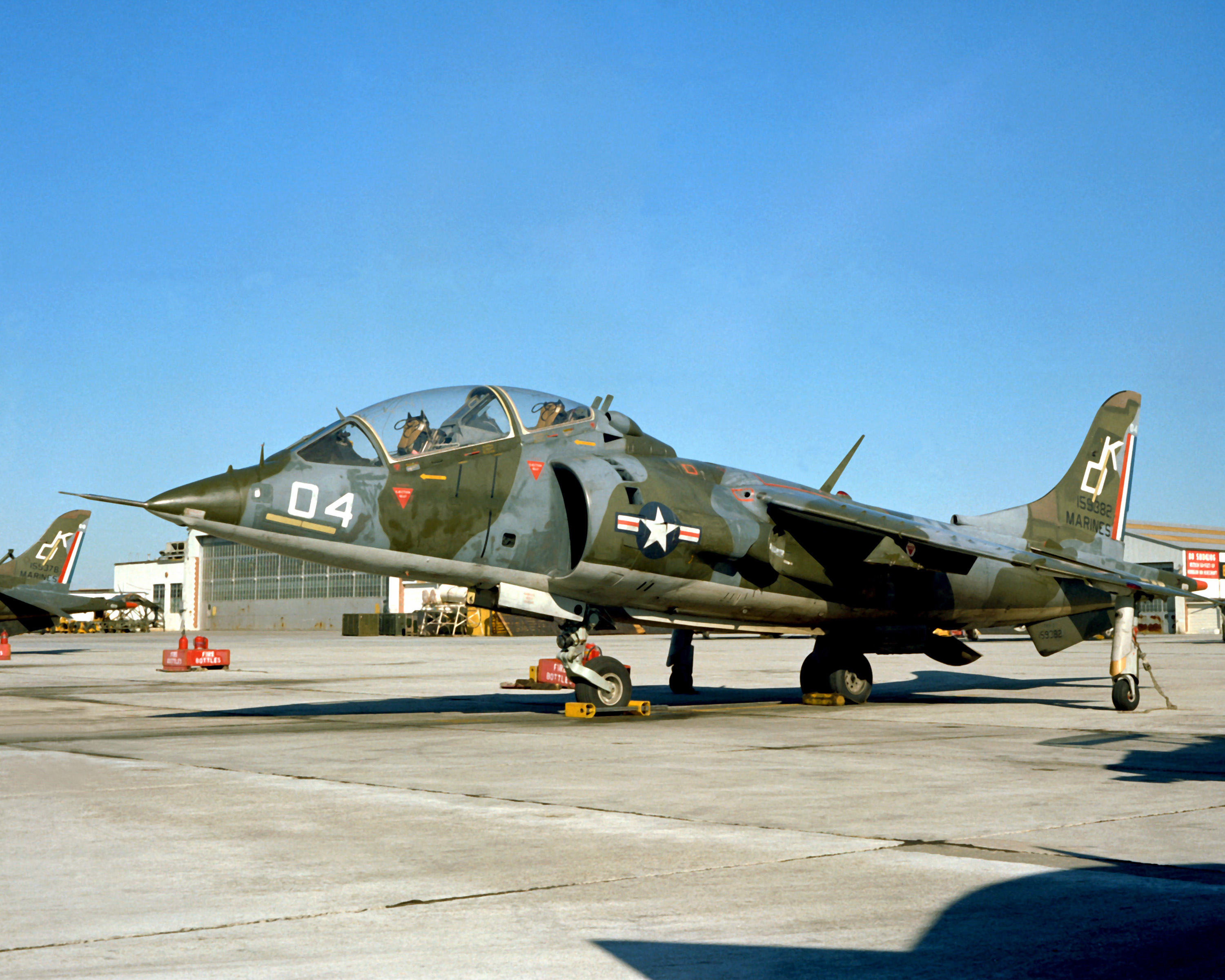
A TAV-8A Harrier from VMAT-203.

KD

Assigned to	Assigned on	Notes
ATU-102, Advanced Training Unit 102	Circa 1950	
VMT-203 Re-designated VMAT-203	December 1967	

KE

Assigned to	Assigned on	Notes
ATU-801, Advanced Training Unit 801	Circa 1950	

KK

Assigned to	Assigned on	Notes
USS Bon Homme Richard (CV-31)	8 January 1946, U.S. Navy Letter FF12-5	Only in effect until December 1946.

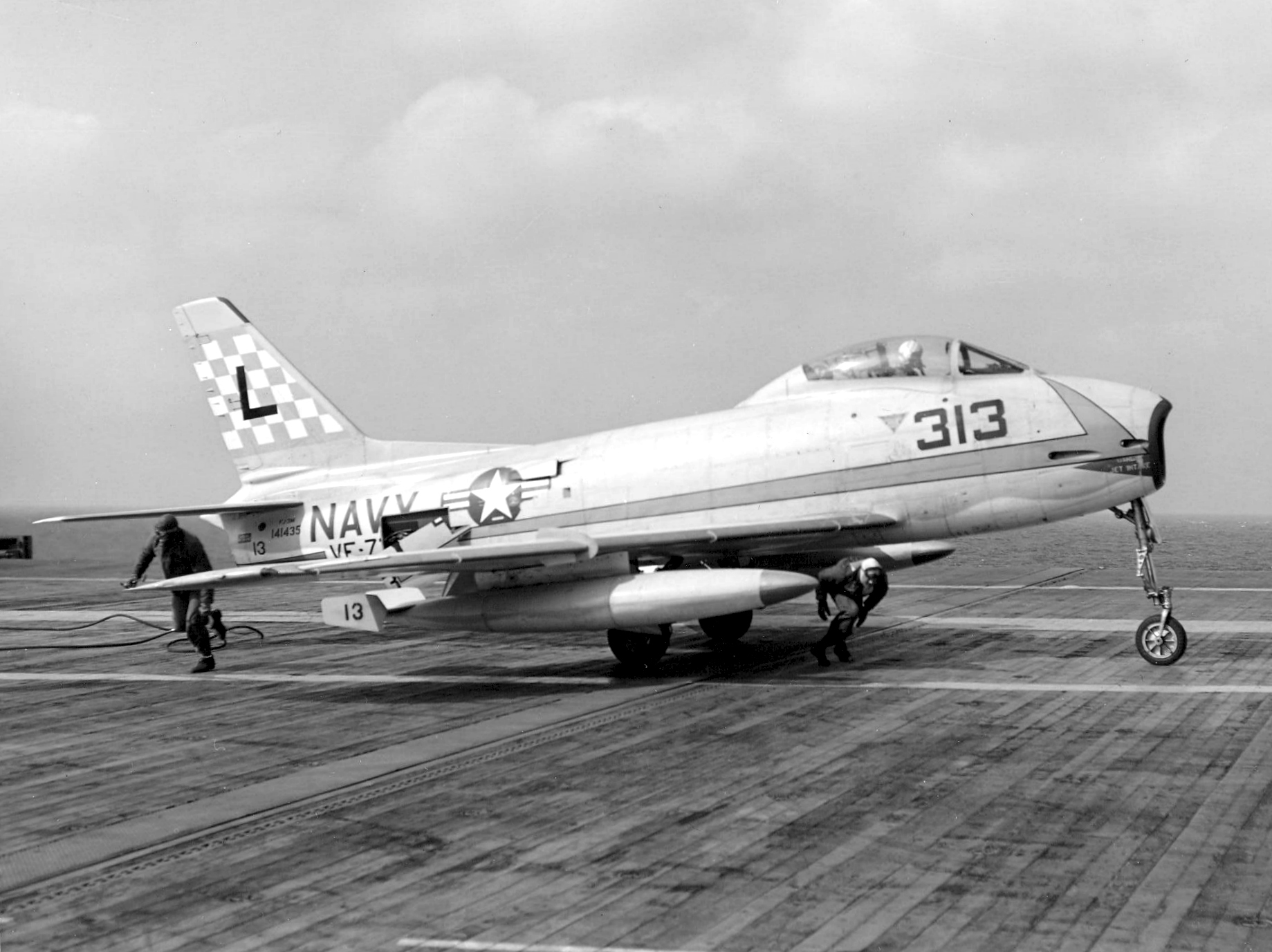
This FJ-3M Fury is seen here with the "L" code of Carrier Air Group 7.

L

Assigned to	Assigned on	Notes
USS Randolph (CV-15)	July 1945	
USS Leyte (CV-32)	8 January 1946, U.S. Navy Letter FF12-5	
CVG-7, Carrier Air Group 7	12 December 1946, U.S. Navy Letter ACL 165-46	Tail code changed to "AG" in November 1956.
Navy Air Reserve units at NAS Akron	November 1946	The "L" code issued to this NAS was a controlled duplicate of the same code letter given to CVG-7. Code changed to "7A" in 1956.
Navy Air Reserve units at NAS Los Alamitos	November 1946	Code changed to "7L" in 1956.

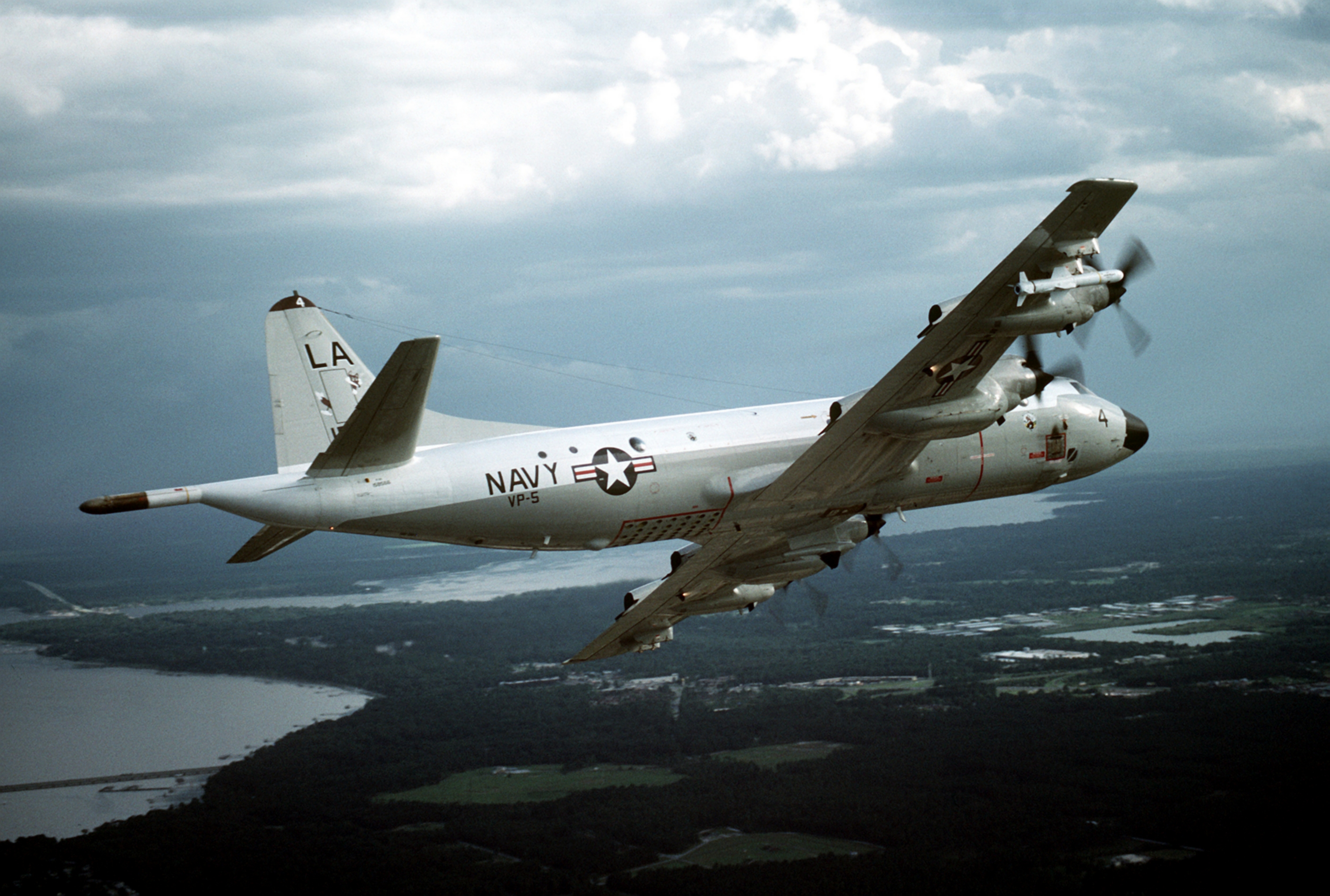
A P-3C Orion of VP-5 carries the squadron's "LA" tail code.

LA

Assigned to	Assigned on	Notes
VCN-2, Night Development Squadron Atlantic	7 November 1946, U.S. Navy Letter ACL 156-46	
VP-MS-3	7 November 1946, U.S. Navy Letter ACL 156-46	
FAWTULANT, Fleet All Weather Training Unit Atlantic	4 August 1948, U.S. Navy Letter ACL 69-48	
VP-5	1957	

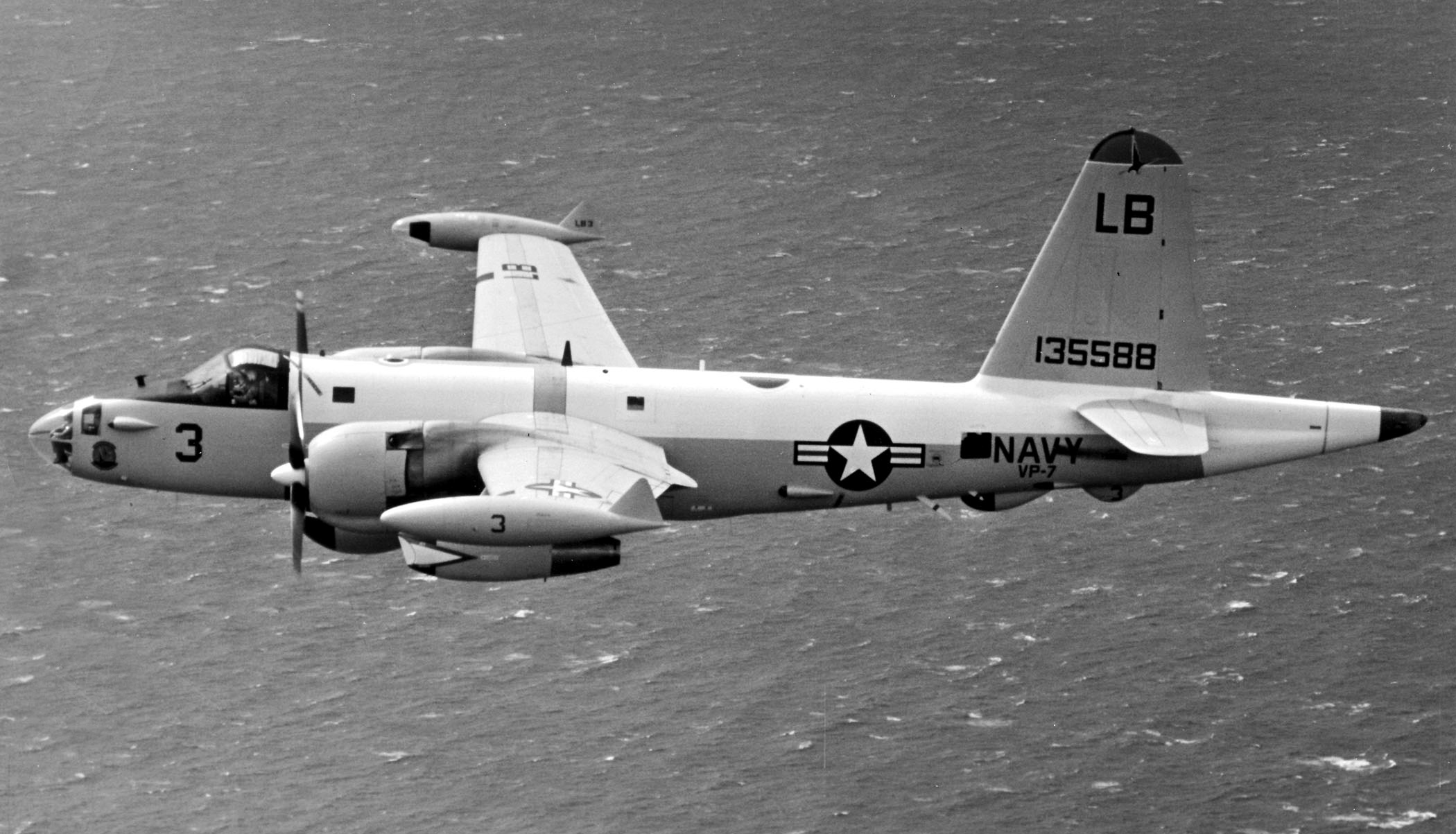
A P2V-7 Neptune assigned to patrol squadron VP-7 flies over the Atlantic in 1964.

LB

Assigned to	Assigned on	Notes
VP-HL-9 Re-designated VP-HL-7	7 November 1946, U.S. Navy Letter ACL 156-46	Tail code changed to "HE" in 1948.
VMR-352	4 August 1948, U.S. Navy Letter ACL 69-48	
VP-7	1957	Disestablished in October 1969.

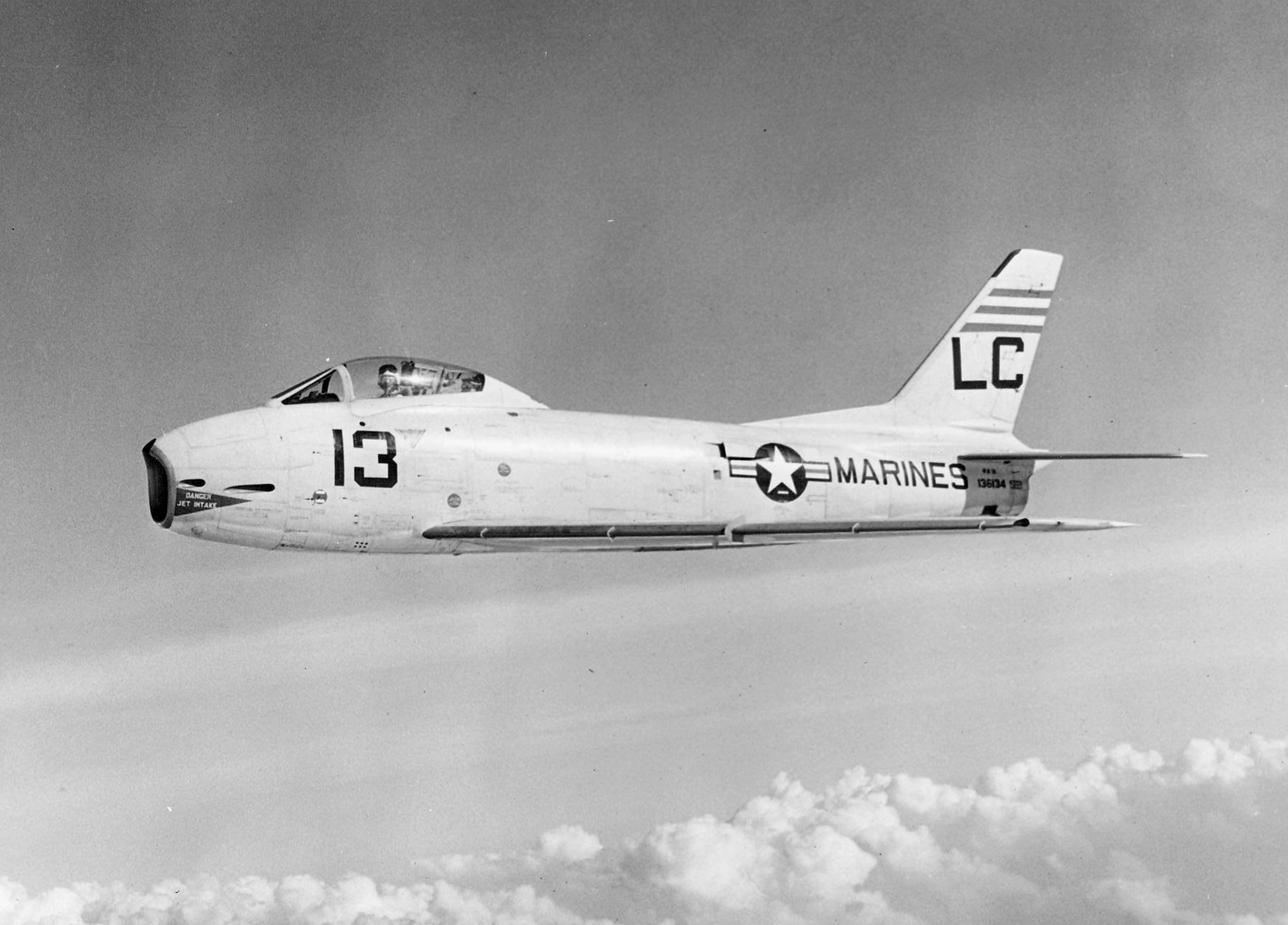
The "LC" tail code on this FJ-3 Fury denotes assignment to VMF-122.

LC

Assigned to	Assigned on	Notes
VMF-122	4 August 1948, U.S. Navy Letter ACL 69-48	Tail code changed to "DC" in 1957.
VP-8	1957	

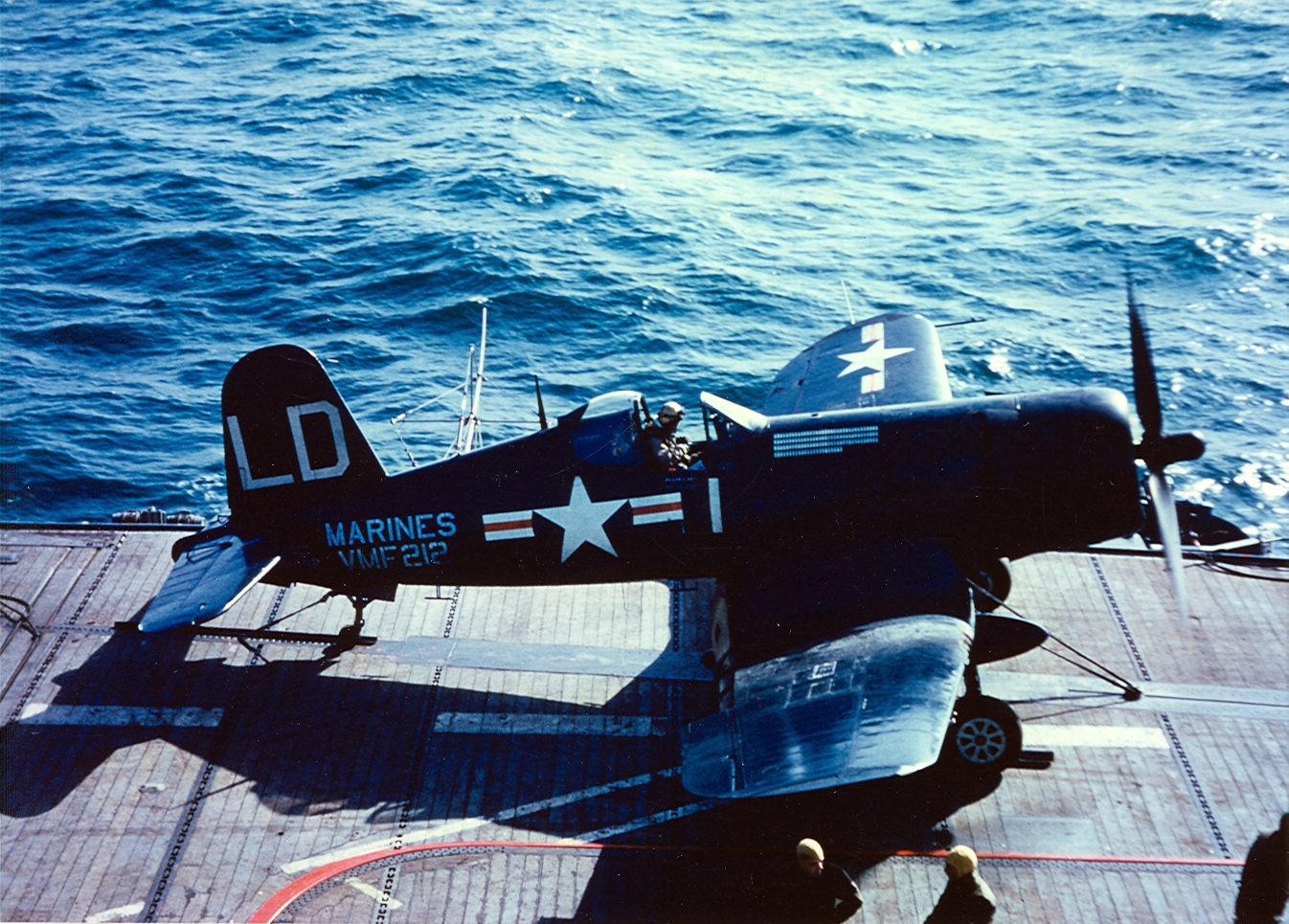
This 1952 photograph shows an F4U-4 Corsair from VMF-212 for a combat sortie over Korea.

LD

Assigned to	Assigned on	Notes
VMF-212	4 August 1948, U.S. Navy Letter ACL 69-48	
VP-10	1957	

LE

Assigned to	Assigned on	Notes
VMF-222	4 August 1948, U.S. Navy Letter ACL 69-48	Disestablished in December 1949.
VP-11	1957	Disestablished on 2 August 1997

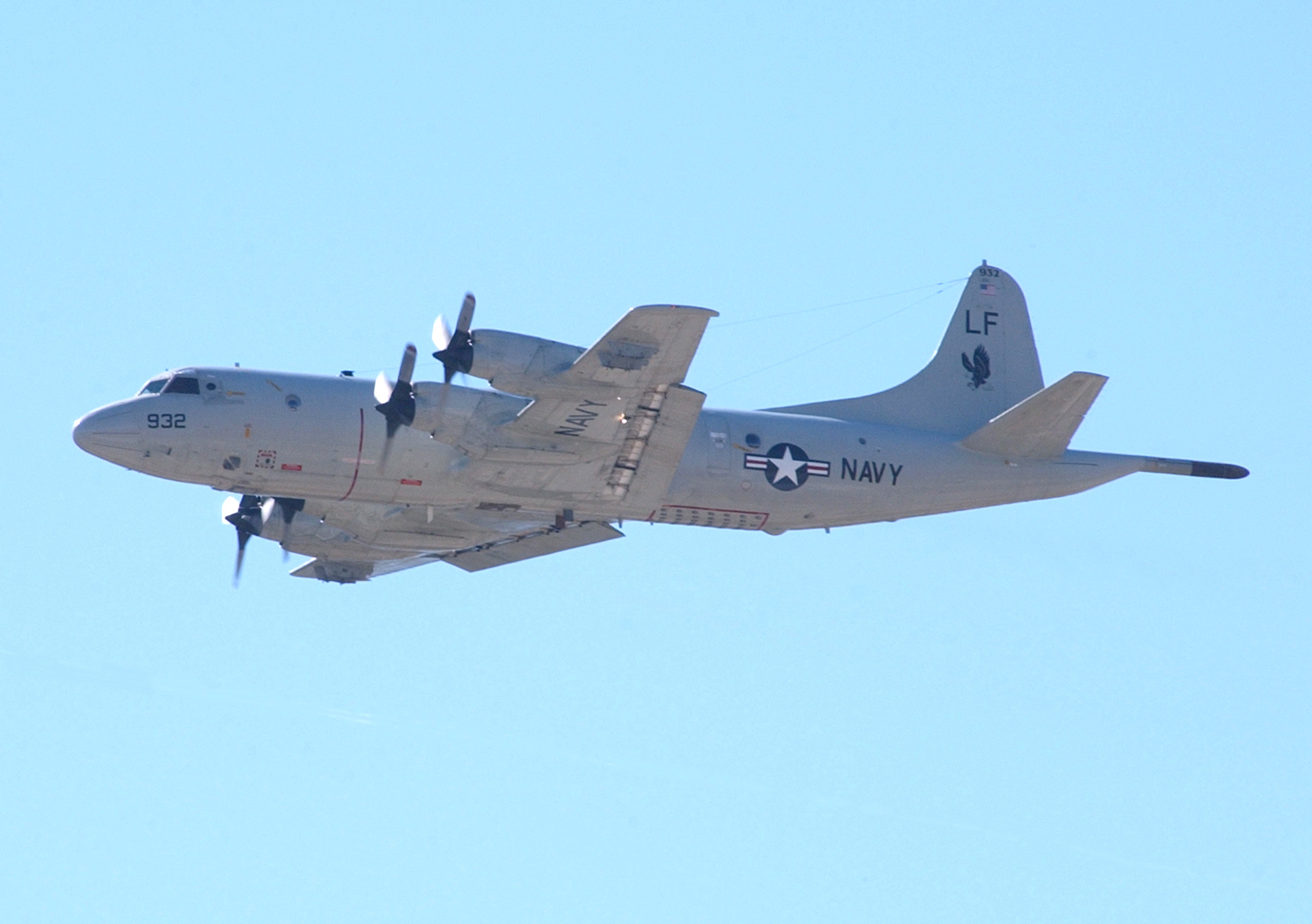
An Orion of Patrol Squadron 16.

LF

Assigned to	Assigned on	Notes
VMT-1	4 August 1948, U.S. Navy Letter ACL 69-48	
VMFT-20	December 1951	
VP-16	1957	

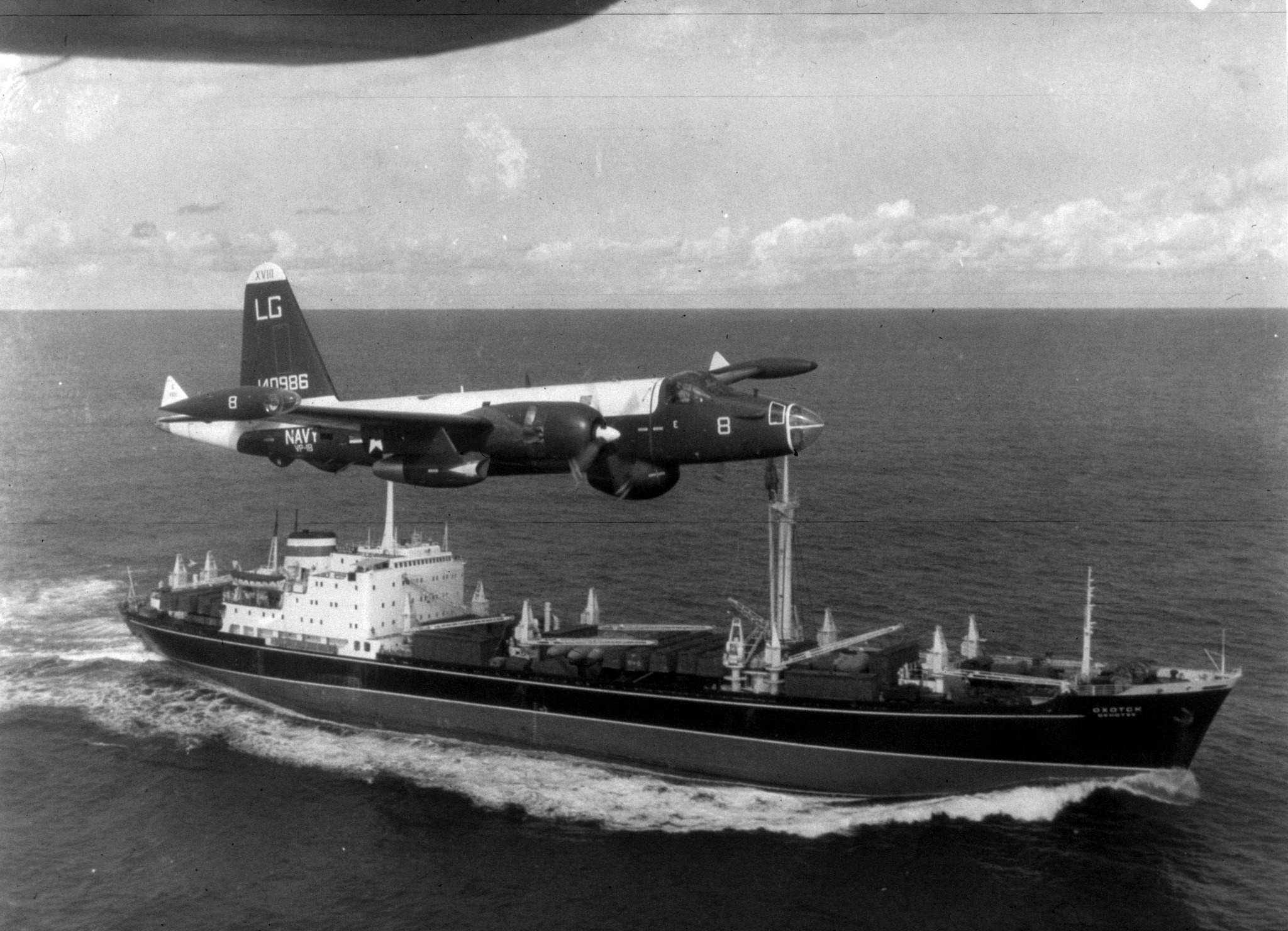
An SP-2H Neptune of Patrol Squadron 18 seen in 1962 flying over a Soviet ship.

LG

Assigned to	Assigned on	Notes
VP-18	1957	Disestablished in October 1968.

LH

Assigned to	Assigned on	Notes
VMR-252	4 August 1948, U.S. Navy Letter ACL 69-48	
VP-21	1957	Disestablished in November 1969.
VP-93	July 1976	Disestablished in September 1994.

LI

Assigned to	Assigned on	Notes
MTACS-1	4 August 1948, U.S. Navy Letter ACL 69-48	

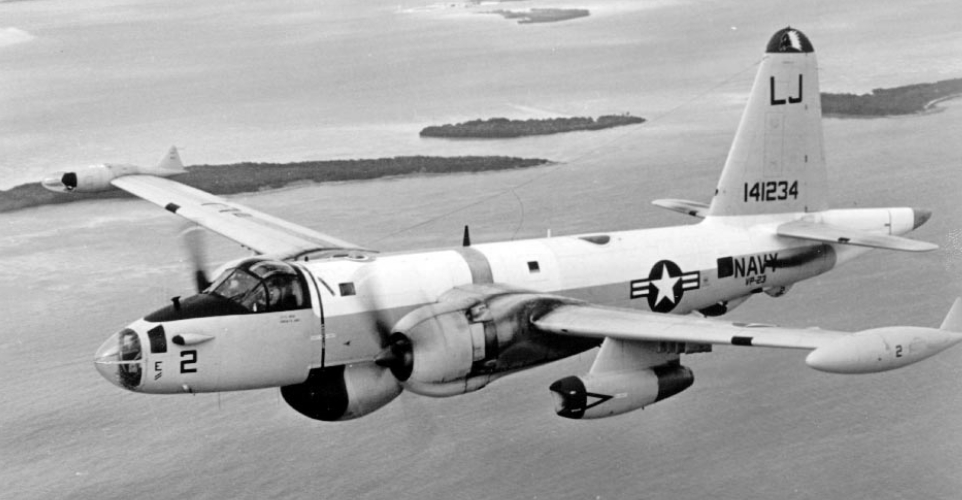
An SP-2H Neptune of Patrol Squadron 23 in flight.

LJ

Assigned to	Assigned on	Notes
VP-23	1957	Disestablished in February 1995.

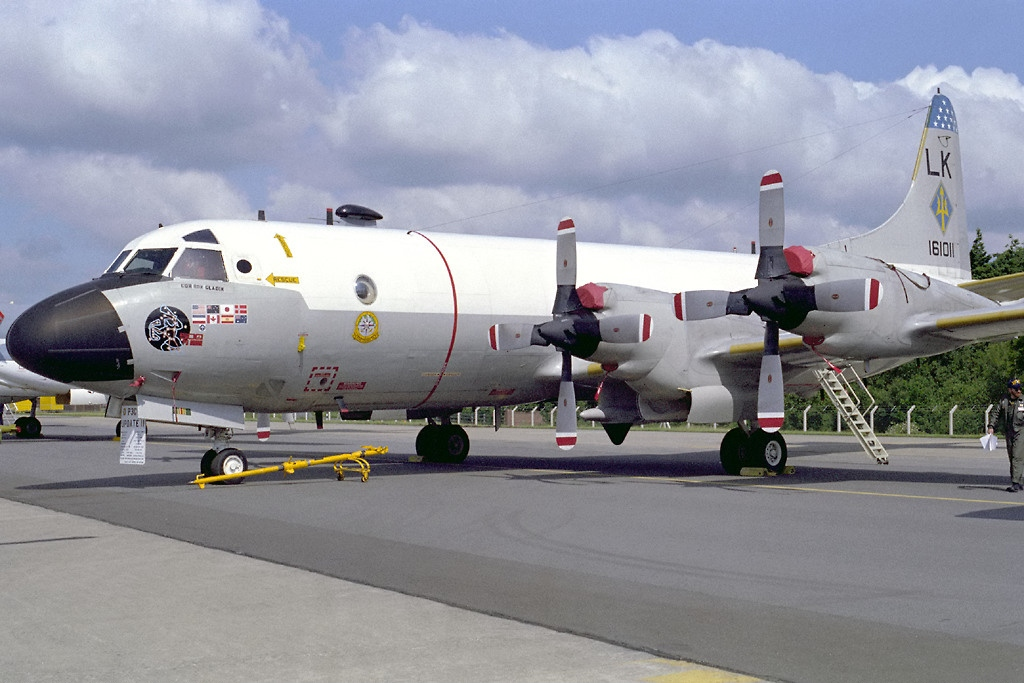
An Orion of Patrol Squadron 26 in 1981.

LK

Assigned to	Assigned on	Notes
VMF(N)-114 Subsequently, re-designated VMF-114	4 August 1948, U.S. Navy Letter ACL 69-48	
VP-26	1957	

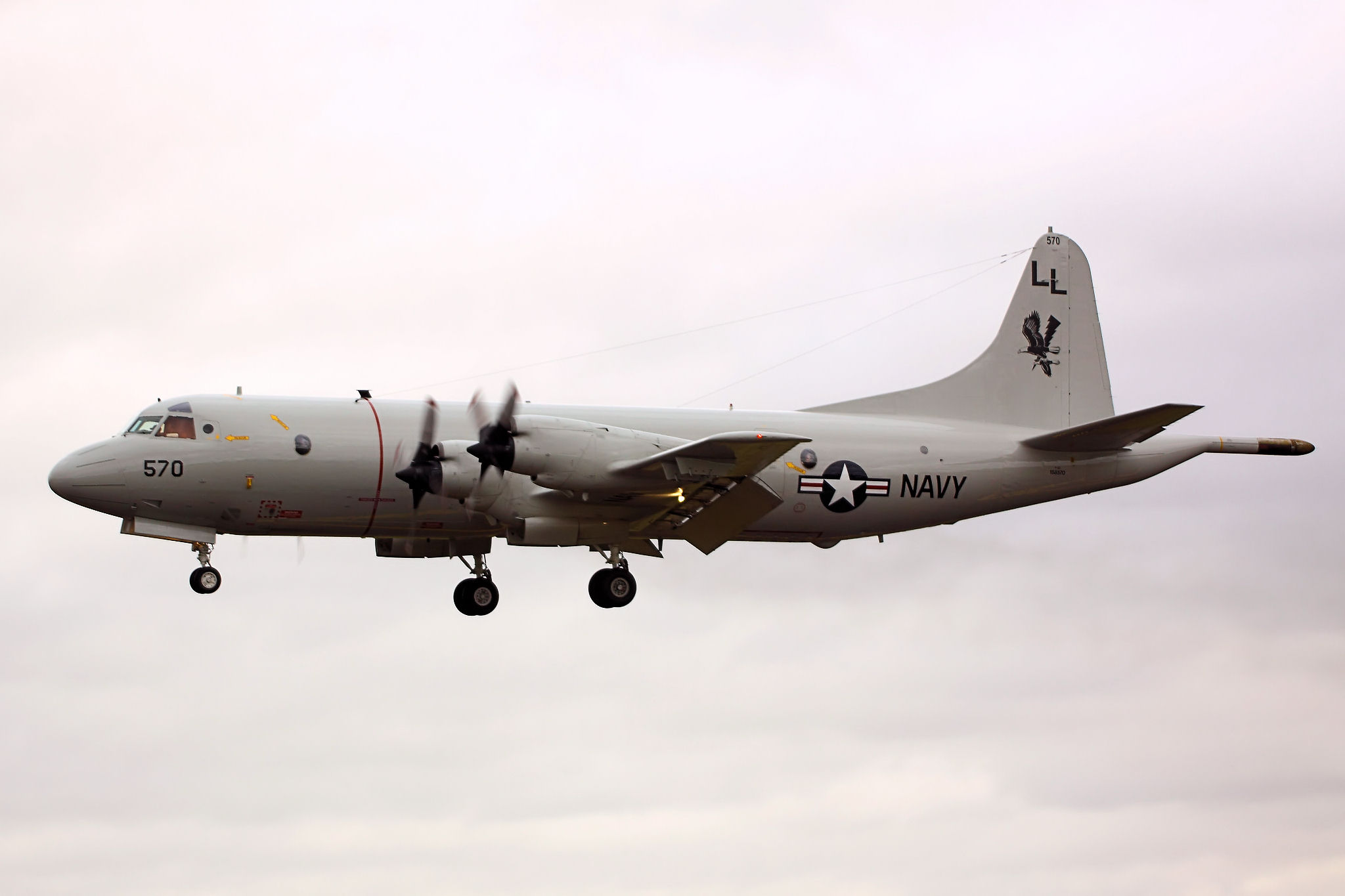
An Orion of Patrol Squadron 30 in 2010.

LL

Assigned to	Assigned on	Notes
USS Franklin (CV-13)	July 1945	
USS Lexington (CV-16)	8 January 1946, U.S. Navy Letter FF12-5	
HEDRON-2, Headquarters Squadron Marine Air Wing 2	4 August 1948, U.S. Navy Letter ACL 69-48	
VP-30	June 1960	

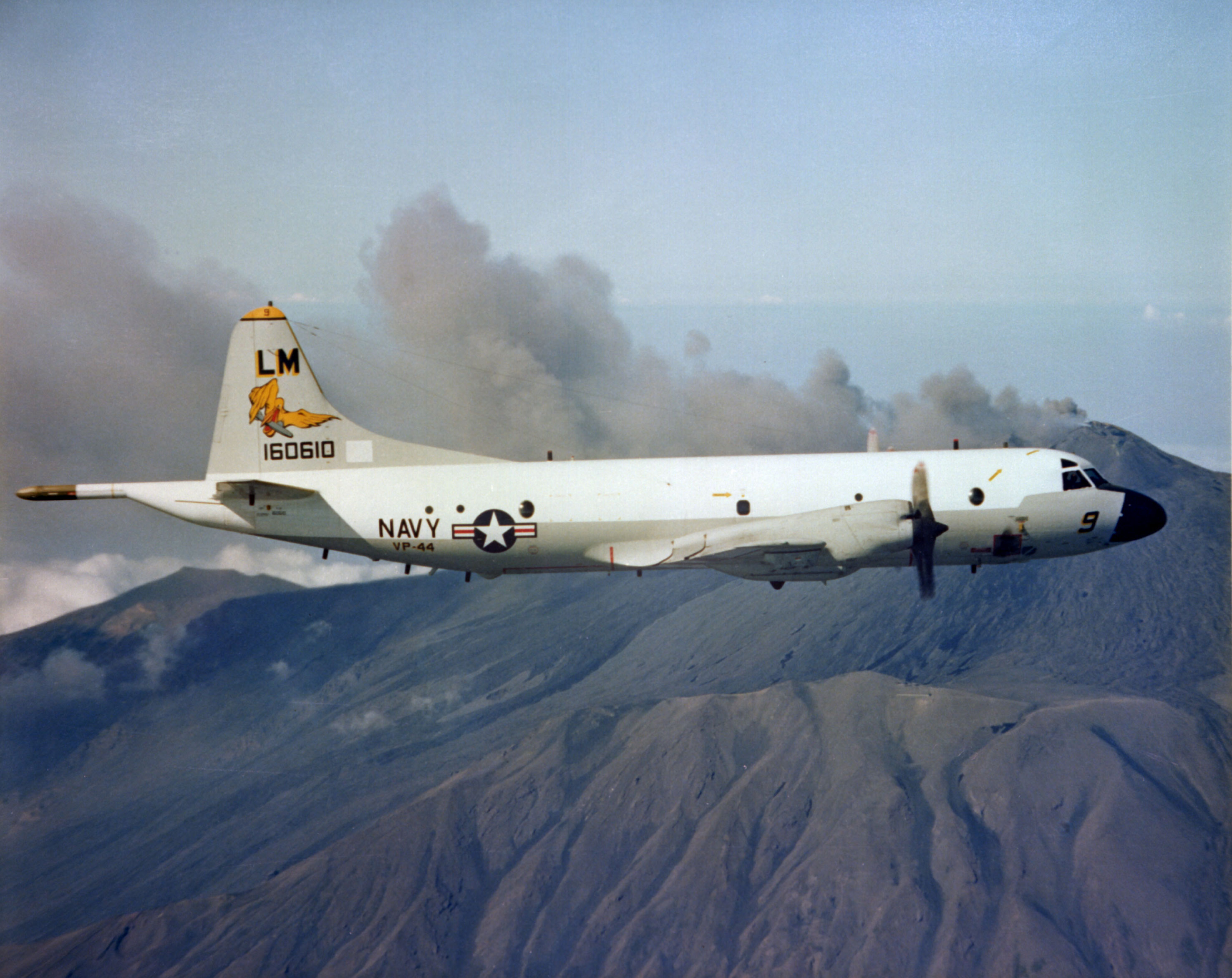
An Orion of Patrol Squadron 44 in 1984.

LM

Assigned to	Assigned on	Notes
HEDRON-11, Headquarters Squadron Marine Air Group 11	4 August 1948, U.S. Navy Letter ACL 69-48	
VP-44	1957	Disestablished in June 1991.

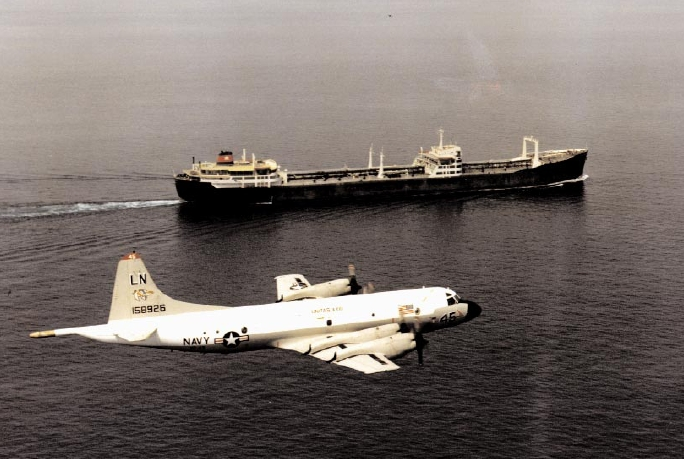
An Orion of Patrol Squadron 45 in flight over a Soviet freighter.

LN

Assigned to	Assigned on	Notes
HEDRON-14, Headquarters Squadron Marine Air Group 14	4 August 1948, U.S. Navy Letter ACL 69-48	
VP-45	1957	

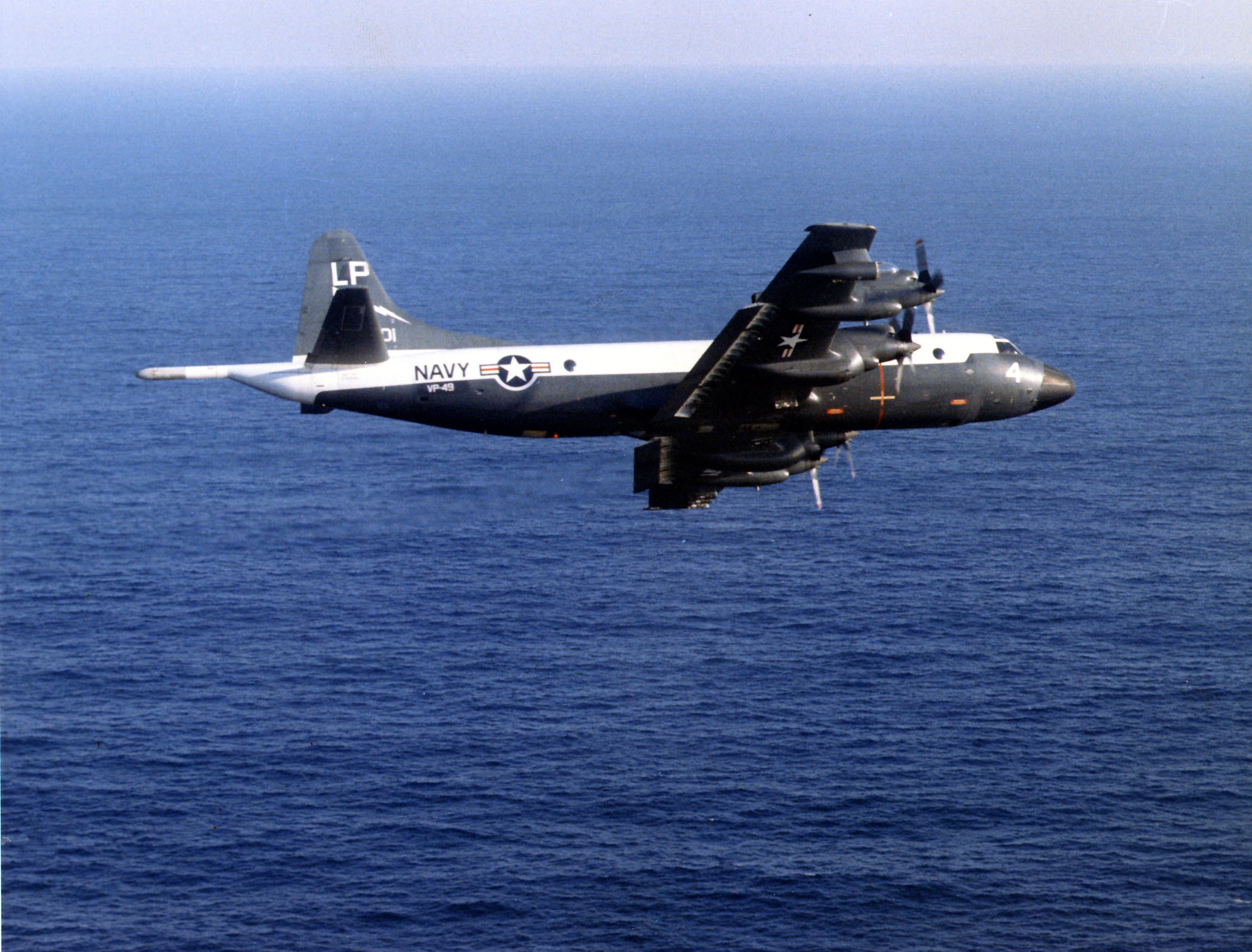
A P-3A Orion of Patrol Squadron 49 in 1964.

LP

Assigned to	Assigned on	Notes
VMF-461	4 August 1948, U.S. Navy Letter ACL 69-48	
VP-49	1957	Disestablished in March 1994.

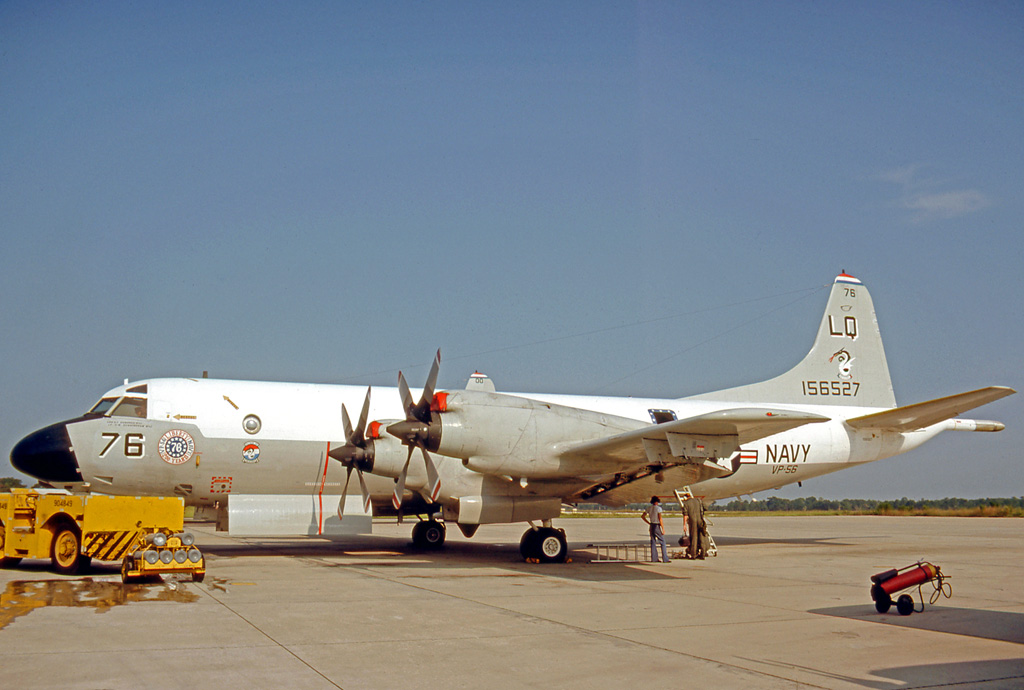
A P-3C Orion of Patrol Squadron 56 in 1976.

LQ

Assigned to	Assigned on	Notes
VP-56	1957	Disestablished in June 1991.

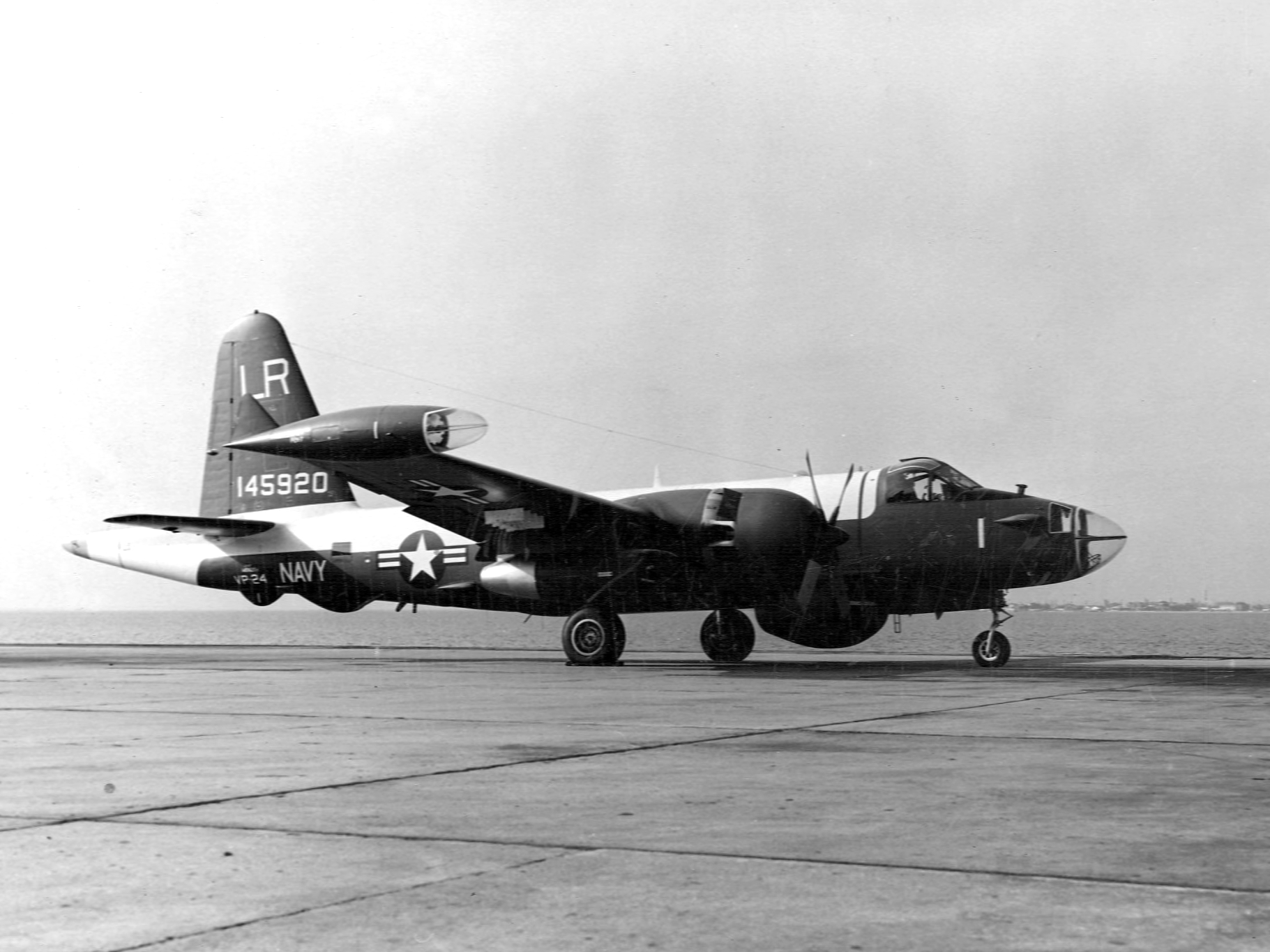
A P2V-7S Neptune of Patrol Squadron 24 in the early 1960s.

LR

Assigned to	Assigned on	Notes
VMO-1	4 August 1948, U.S. Navy Letter ACL 69-48	Code changed to "ER" in 1957.
VA(HM)-13 Re-designated VP-24	1957	Disestablished in April 1995.

LS

Assigned to	Assigned on	Notes
VMO-2	June 1951	Code changed to "VS" in 1957.
VP-832	October 1961	Deactivated in August 1962.
VP-60	November 1970	Disestablished in September 1994.
VMFT-401		

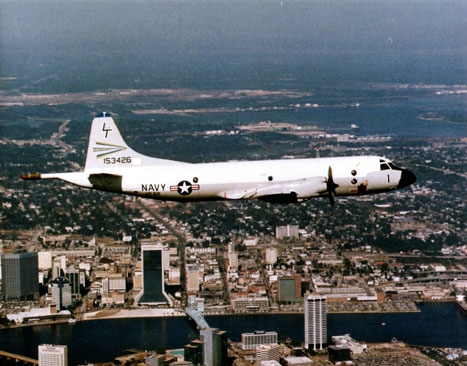
A P-3B Orion of VP-62 in the 1980s.

LT

Assigned to	Assigned on	Notes
VMF(N)-531	4 August 1948, U.S. Navy Letter ACL 69-48	
VP-933	October 1961	Deactivated in August 1962.
VP-62	November 1970	

LU

Assigned to	Assigned on	Notes
HEDRON-3, Headquarters Squadron Marine Air Wing 3	February 1952	
MARS-37, Maintenance and Repair Squadron 37		
VP-741	October 1961	Deactivated in August 1962.
VP-64 Re-designated VR-64	November 1970	

LV

Assigned to	Assigned on	Notes
VMF-354	4 August 1948, U.S. Navy Letter ACL 69-48	Disestablished in December 1949.
HEDRON-31, Headquarters Squadron Marine Air Group 31	March 1952	
VP-661	October 1961	Deactivated in August 1962.
VP-66	November 1970	Disestablished March 2006.

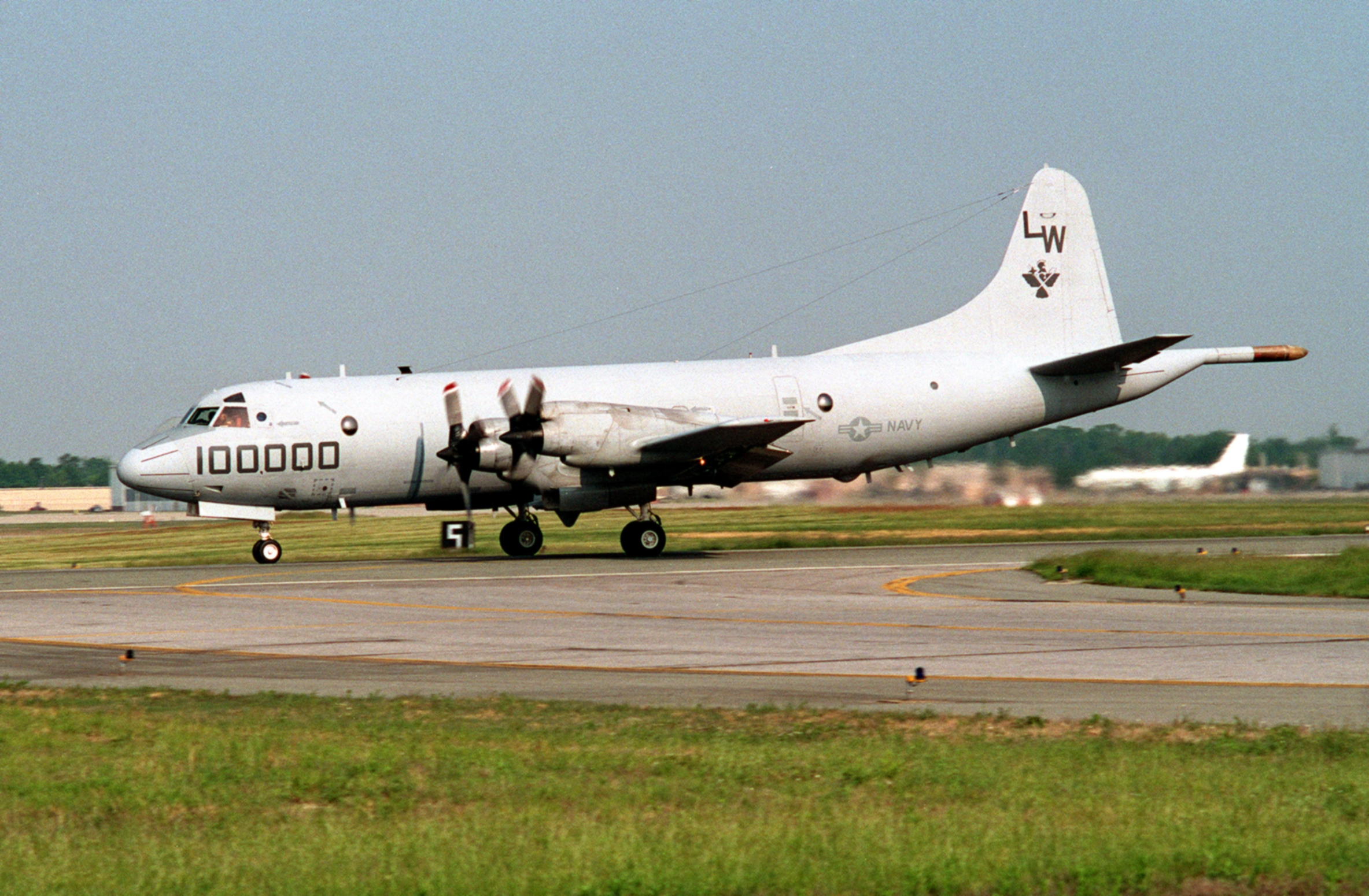
A specially marked P-33 Orion of VP-68 in 1994.

LW

Assigned to	Assigned on	Notes
AIRFMFWESPAC, Headquarters Squadron Aircraft Fleet Marine Force West Pacific	4 August 1948, U.S. Navy Letter ACL 69-48	
VMF-314	29 July 1950, U.S. Navy Letter ACL 43-50	
VP-68	November 1970	Disestablished in January 1997.

LX

Assigned to	Assigned on	Notes
VMA-324	March 1952	Code changed to "DX" in 1957.
VP-90	November 1970	Disestablished in September 1994.

LY

Assigned to	Assigned on	Notes
VMAT-20	December 1951	Deactivated in August 1962.
VP-92	November 1970	Disestablished in October 2007.

LZ

Assigned to	Assigned on	Notes
AIRFMFLANT, Headquarters Squadron Aircraft Fleet Marine Force Atlantic	4 August 1948, U.S. Navy Letter ACL 69-48	Code changed to "BZ" in 1957.
VP-94	November 1970	Disestablished in September 2006.

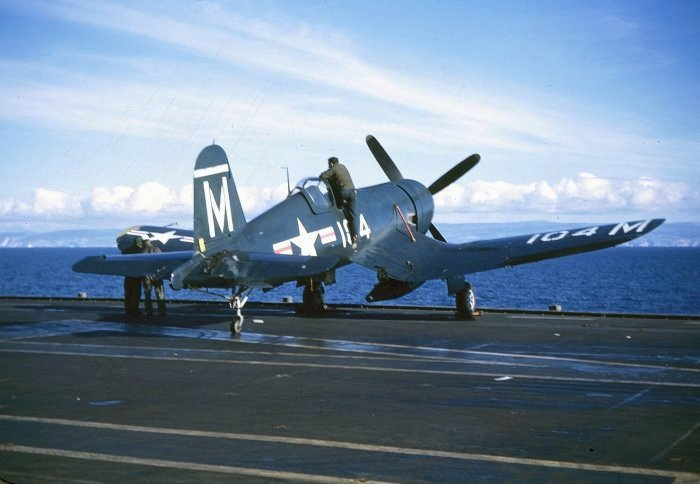
The "M" tail code of this F4U-4 Corsair indicates assignment to Carrier Air Group 1.

M

Assigned to	Assigned on	Notes
USS Enterprise (CV-6)	July 1945	
USS Midway (CV-41)	8 January 1946, U.S. Navy Letter FF12-5	
CVBG-1, Battler Carrier Air Group 1	12 December 1946, U.S. Navy Letter ACL 165-46	
Navy Air Reserve units at NAS Memphis	November 1946	The "M" code issued to this NAS was a controlled duplicate of the same code letter given to CVG-2. Code changed to "6M" in 1956.
CVG-2, Carrier Air Group 2	July 1953	Tail code changed to "NE" in November 1956.

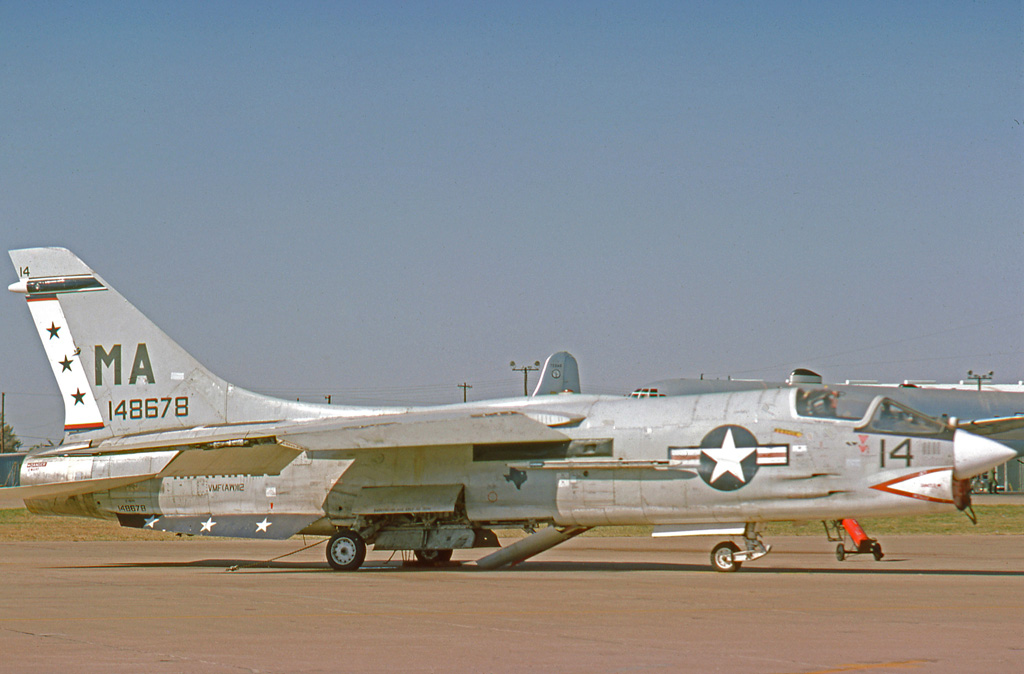
An F-8H Crusader of VMF(AW)-112 in 1975.

MA

Assigned to	Assigned on	Notes
VP-MS-1 Re-designated VP-ML-8	7 November 1946, U.S. Navy Letter ACL 156-46	Tail code changed to "HD" in August 1948.
ATU-1, Advanced Training Unit 1	November 1947	
VP-MS-11 Re-designated VP-41	4 August 1948, U.S. Navy Letter ACL 69-48	Disestablished in April 1949.
VP-23	July 1950	Tail code changed to "LJ" in 1957.
VS-27	1957	
VMF(AW)-112 Re-designated VMFA-112	January 1972	

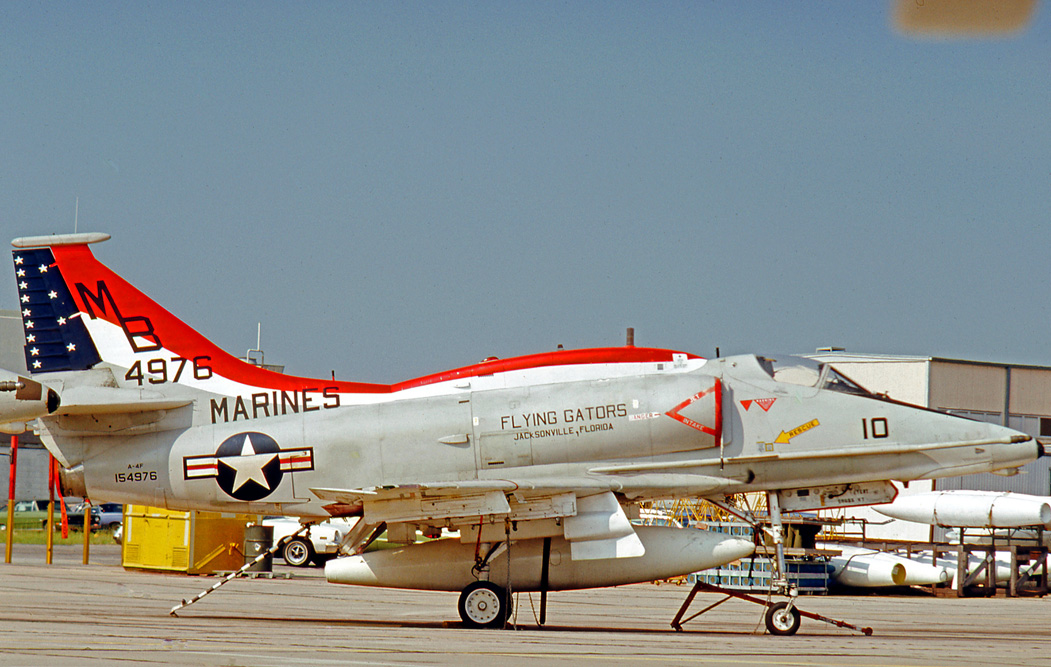
A brightly painted A-4F Skyhawk of VMA-142 in 1976.

MB

Assigned to	Assigned on	Notes
VP-MS-8 Re-designated VP-48	7 November 1946, U.S. Navy Letter ACL 156-46	Disestablished in December 1949.
ATU-2, Advanced Training Unit 2	November 1947	
VP-3	July 1950	Disestablished in November 1955.
VS-30	1957	
VMF-142 Subsequently, re-designated VMA-142 and VMFA-142	January 1972	Disestablished in July 2008.

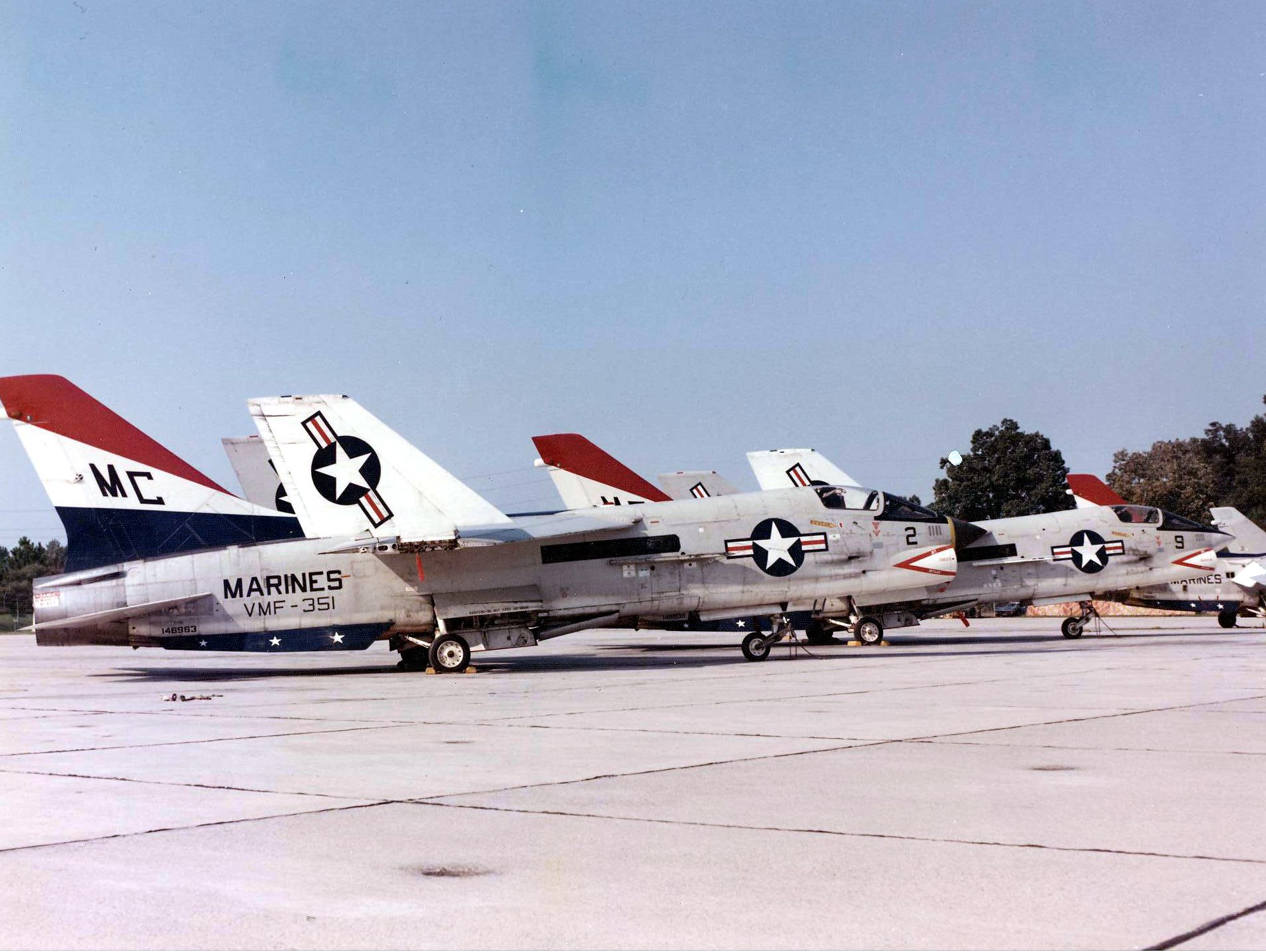
F-8K Crusaders from Marine Fighter Squadron 351.

MC

Assigned to	Assigned on	Notes
ATU-4, Advanced Training Unit 4	November 1947	
VP-ML-5 Re-designated VP-5	4 August 1948, U.S. Navy Letter ACL 69-48	Tail code changed to "LA" in 1957.
VS-31	1957	
VMF-351	January 1972	Disestablished in May 1976.

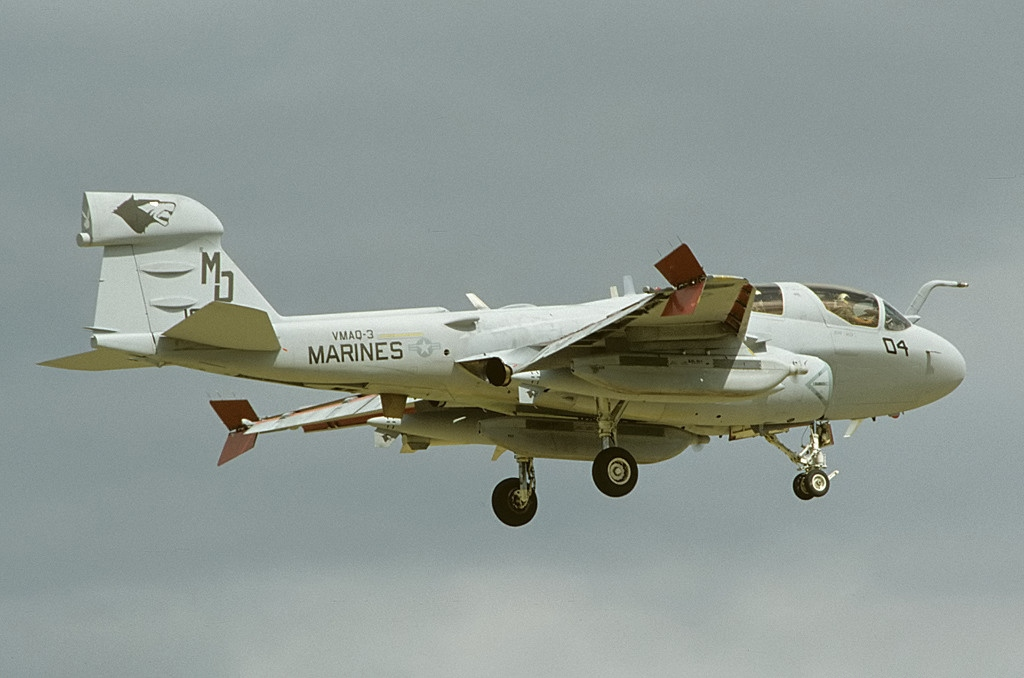
An EA-6B Prowler carries the "MD" code of VMAQ-3.

MD

Assigned to	Assigned on	Notes
ATU-5, Advanced Training Unit 5 ATU-301, Advanced Training Unit 301	November 1947	
VS-32	1957	
VMA-543	January 1972	Disestablished in April 1974.
VMAQ-3	July 1992	

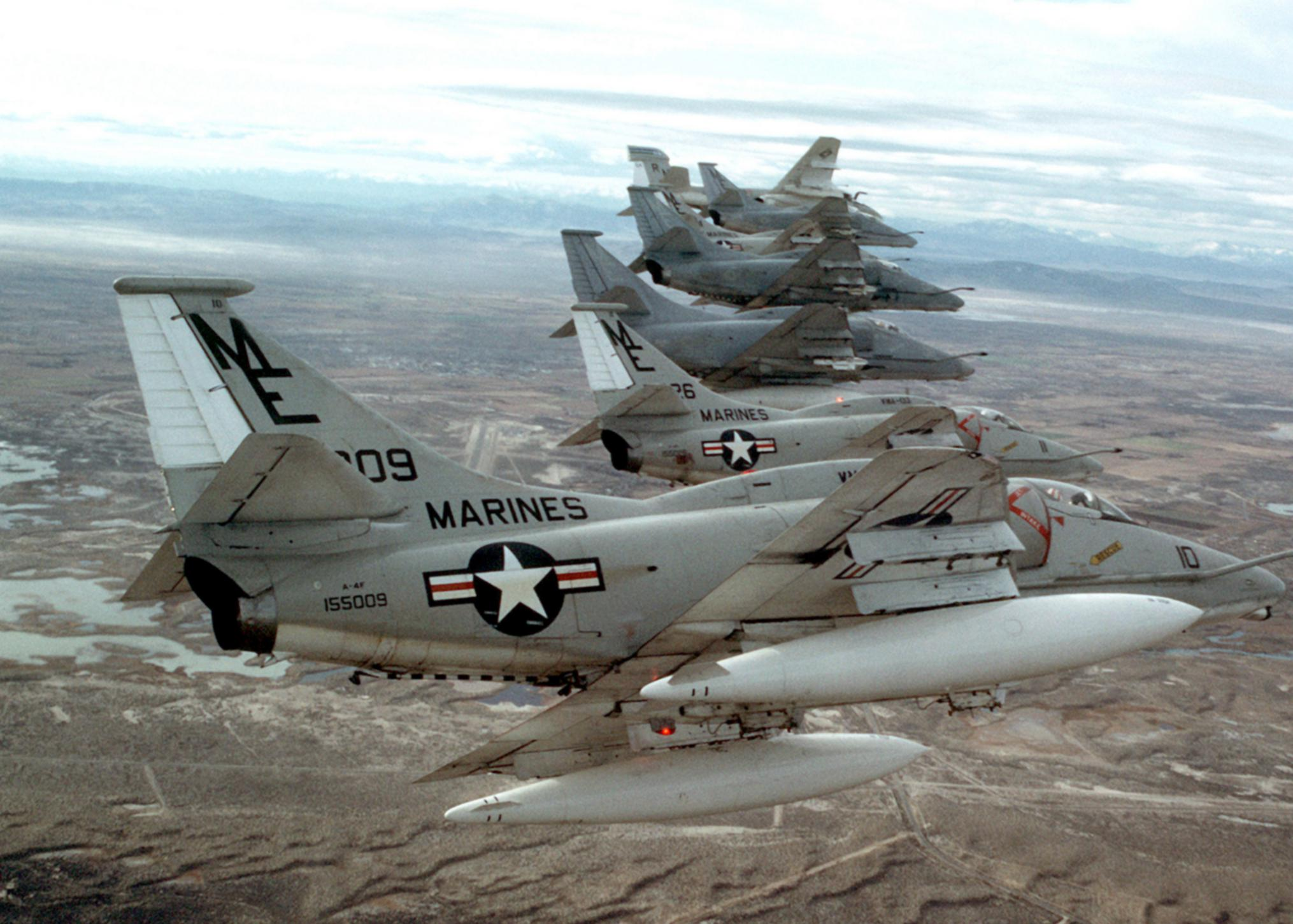
Several A-4F Skyhawk aircraft from VMA-133 fly in formation in 1981.

ME

Assigned to	Assigned on	Notes
VS-36	1957	
VMA-133	January 1972	Disestablished in September 1992.

MF

Assigned to	Assigned on	Notes
VMA-334	May 1952.	Tail code changed to "WU".
VS-39	1957	
VMFA-134	April 1958	

MG

Assigned to	Assigned on	Notes
VW-2	1957	Disestablished in July 1961.
VMF-321 Subsequently, re-designated VMA-321 and VMFA-321	January 1972	Disestablished in September 2004.

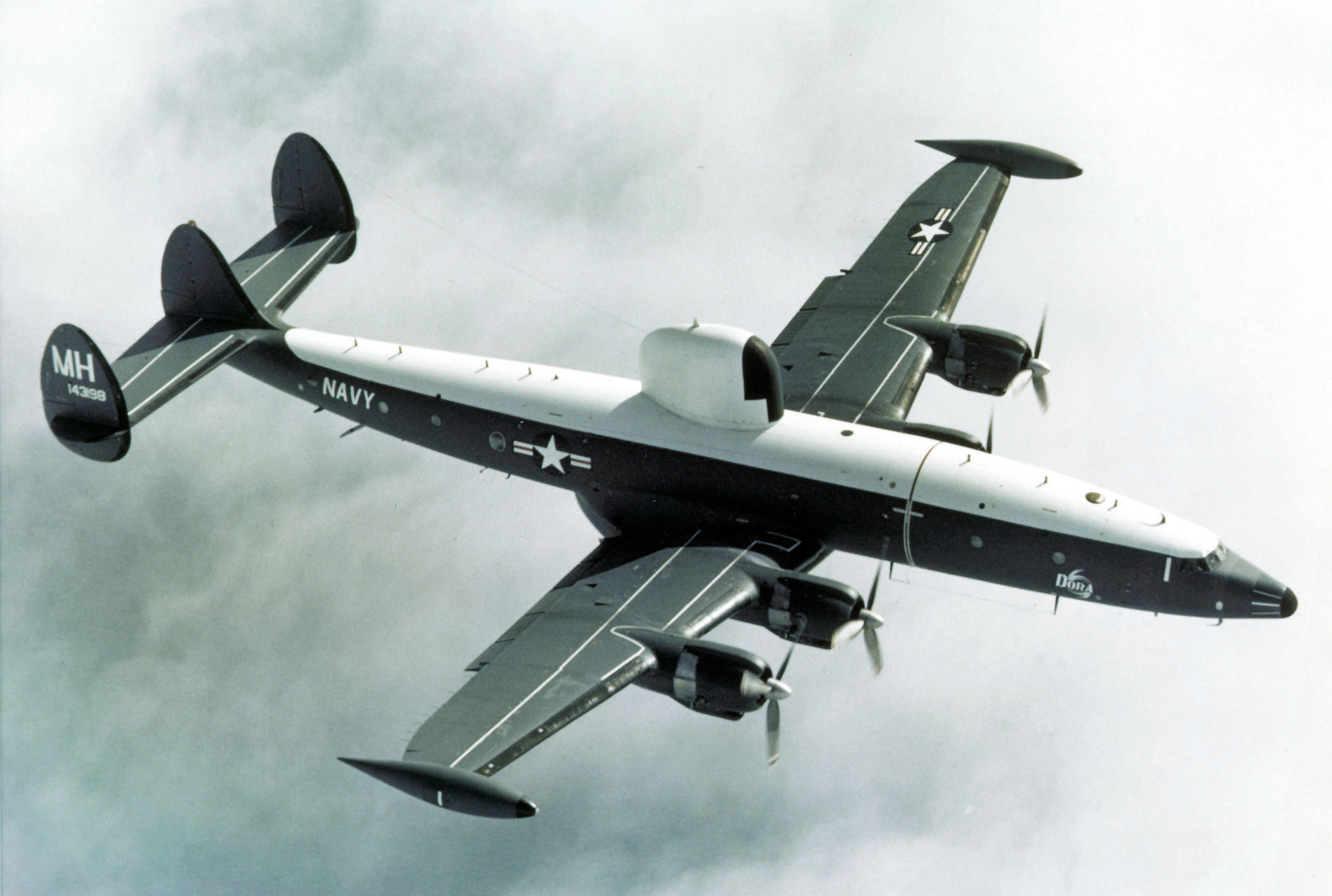
The "MH" tail code of VW-4 is clearly seen on this smartly painted Lockheed WC-121N.

MH

Assigned to	Assigned on	Notes
VW-4	1957	Disestablished June, 1975.

MI

Assigned to	Assigned on	Notes
USS Mindoro (CVE-120)	7 November 1946, U.S. Navy Letter ACL 156-46	
VMF-452	12 December 1946, U.S. Navy Letter ACL 165-46	
VC-23	4 August 1948, U.S. Navy Letter ACL 69-48	
VS-23	29 July 1950, U.S. Navy Letter ACL 43-50	

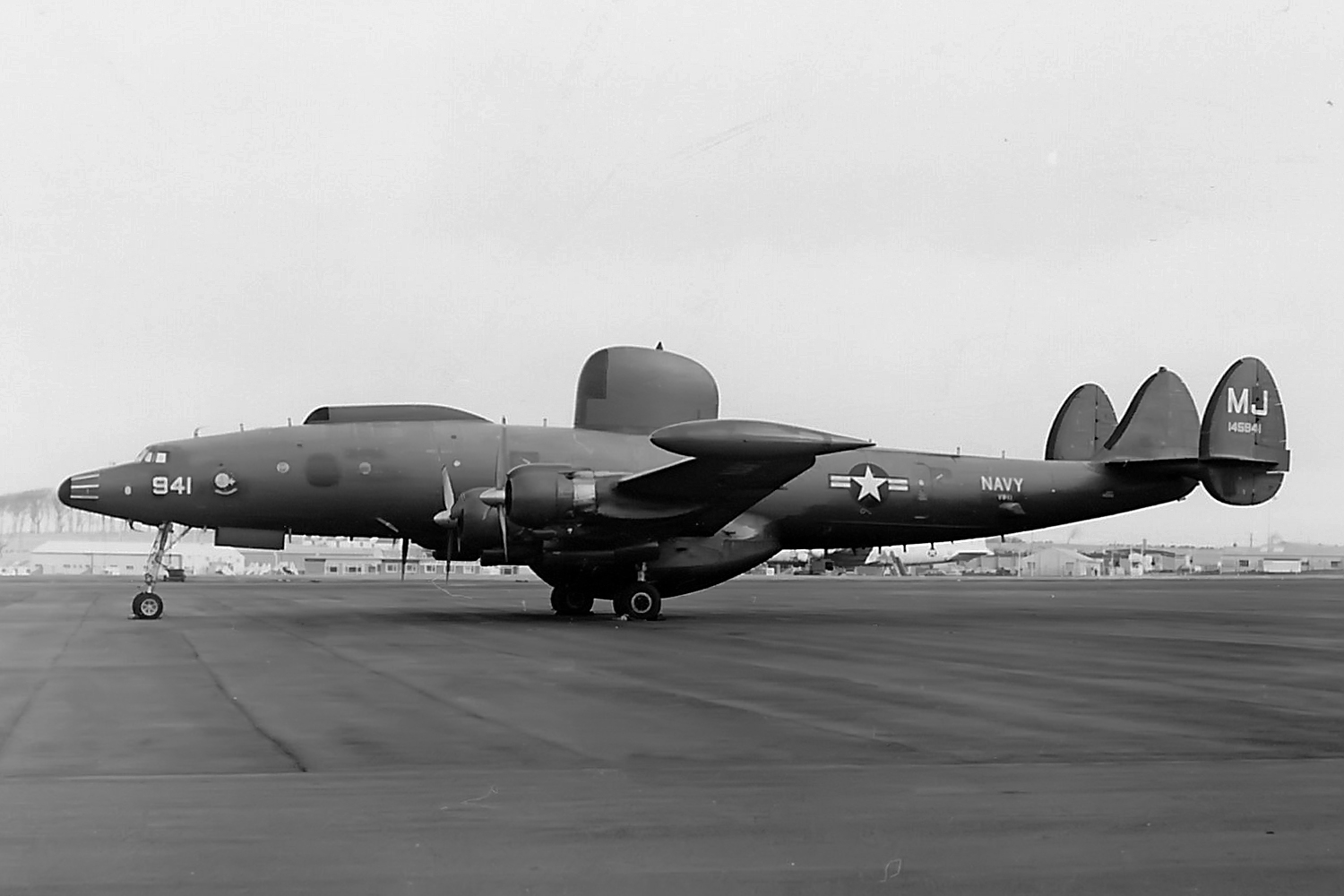
A Lockheed EC-121P Warning Star assigned to airborne early warning squadron VW-11.

MJ

Assigned to	Assigned on	Notes
VW-11	1957	Disestablished in October 1965.
VMCJ-4	January 1972	Disestablished in December 1973.

MK

Assigned to	Assigned on	Notes
HEDRON-45, Headquarters Squadron Marine Air Group 45	June 1952	
VW-13	June 1958	Disestablished in July 1965.
VMF-511	1970	Disestablished in August 1972.

ML

Assigned to	Assigned on	Notes
HEDRON-26, Headquarters Squadron Marine Air Group 26	June 1952	
VW-15	1957	Disestablished in April 1961.
VQ-4	July 1971	
HMM-764 Re-designated VMM-764	1976	

MN

Assigned to	Assigned on	Notes
VMF-333	August 1952	Code changed to "DN" in 1957.
HML-770	1982	Disestablished in 1980.

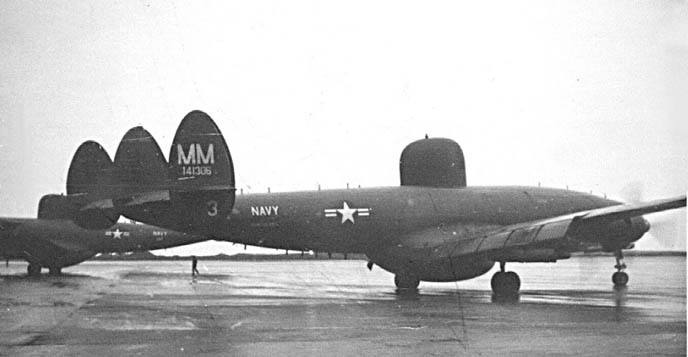
"MM" tail code is seen on this EC-121P Warning Star.

MM

Assigned to	Assigned on	Notes
USS Saratoga (CV-3)	8 January 1946, U.S. Navy Letter FF12-5	Only in effect until December 1946.
HEDRON-35, Headquarters Squadron Marine Air Group 35	April 1952	
AETULANT, Fleet Airborne Electronics Training Unit, Atlantic	1958	
HMLA-767	January 1972	
HMLA-773 Det.A	2009	

MP

Assigned to	Assigned on	Notes
Patrol units of Navy Air Reserve at NAS Memphis	November 1946	A very short-lived assignment.
VMA-331	April 1952	Code changed to "DP" in 1957.
HMR-773 Subsequently, re-designated HMM-773, HMA-773 and HMLA-773	September 1958	

MQ

Assigned to	Assigned on	Notes
HMM-774 Re-designated VMM-774	July 1969	

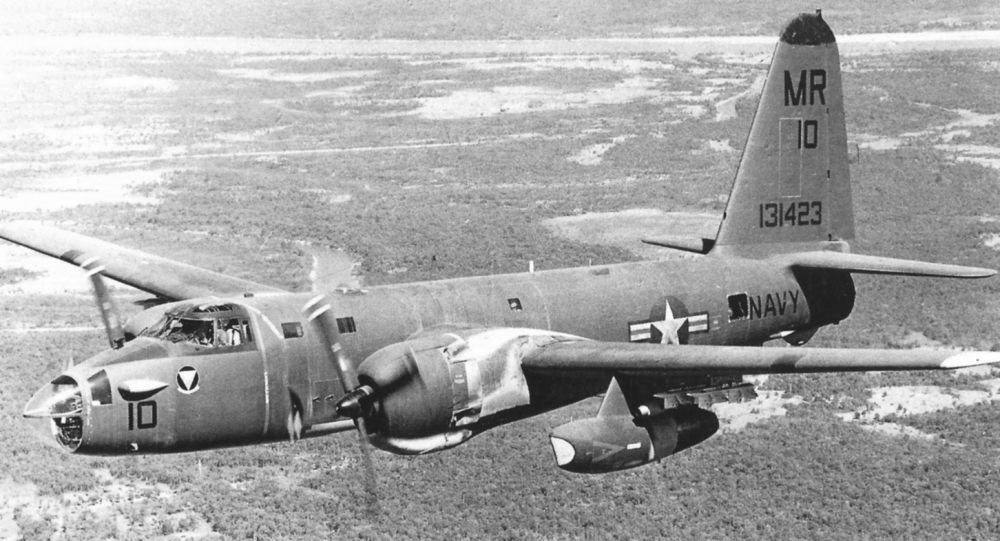
An OP-2E Neptune of the well-known but short-lived Observation Squadron 67 over Laos.

MR

Assigned to	Assigned on	Notes
VMA-332	April 1952	Tail code changed to "EA" in 1957.
VO-67	February 1967	Disestablished in July 1968.
HML-765	January 1972	Disestablished in June 1976.

MS

Assigned to	Assigned on	Notes
HMR-769 Subsequently, re-designated HMM-769 and HMH-769	January 1972	Disestablished in August 2008.

MT

Assigned to	Assigned on	Notes
VMJ-2	1953	
HMR-772 Subsequently, re-designated HMM-772 and HMH-772	April 1958	

MU

Assigned to	Assigned on	Notes
VMJ-3	1953	
VMO-4	September 1962	Disestablished in March 1994.
VMU-4, Marine Unmanned Aerial Vehicle Squadron 4	July 2010	

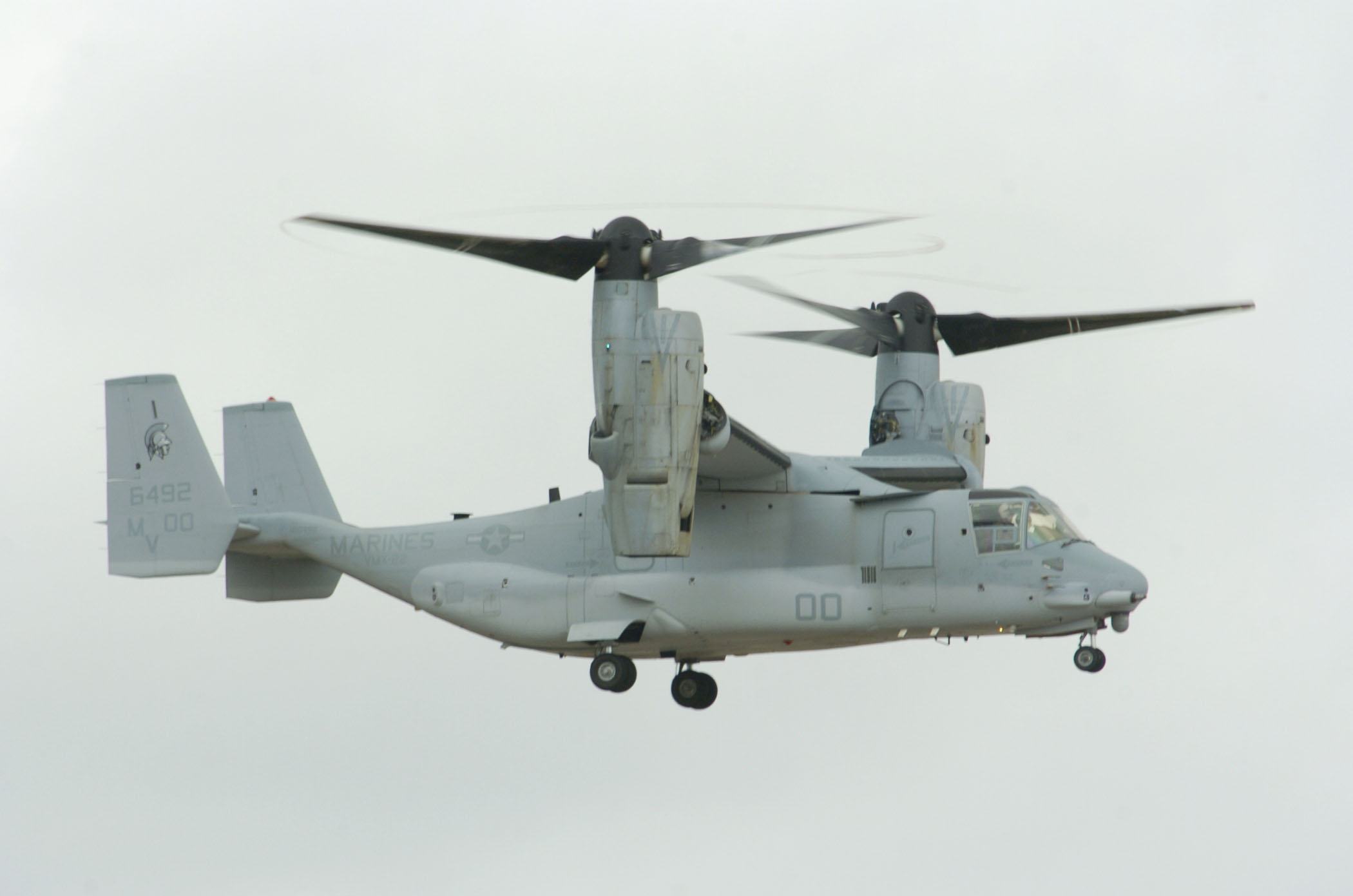
An MV-22B Osprey from VMX-22.

MV

Assigned to	Assigned on	Notes
HEDRON-32, Headquarters Squadron Marine Air Group 32 Re-designated H&MS-32, Headquarters and Maintenance Squadron 32	May 1952	
VMX-22	August 2003	

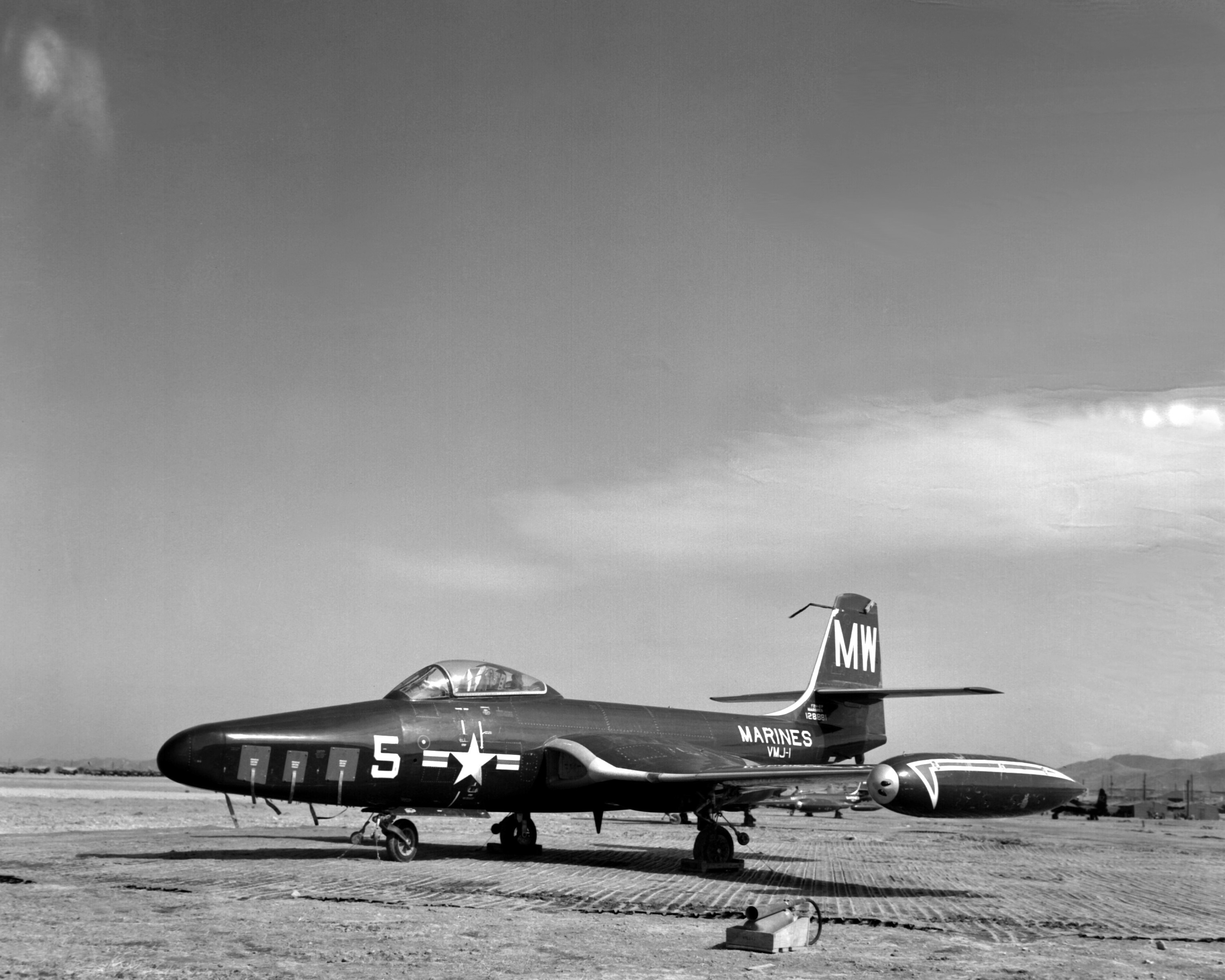
An F2H-2P Banshee of VMJ-1.

MW

Assigned to	Assigned on	Notes
VMJ-1	29 July 1950, U.S. Navy Letter ACL 43-50	Tail code changed to "YW" in 1957.
H&MS-42, Headquarters and Maintenance Squadron 42	January 1972	

MX

Assigned to	Assigned on	Notes
VMF-334 Re-designated VMA-334	May 1952	
HMX-1	September 1958	The squadron's aircraft rarely if ever have their assigned tail code applied.

MY

Assigned to	Assigned on	Notes
H&MS-41, Headquarters and Maintenance Squadron 41	January 1972	

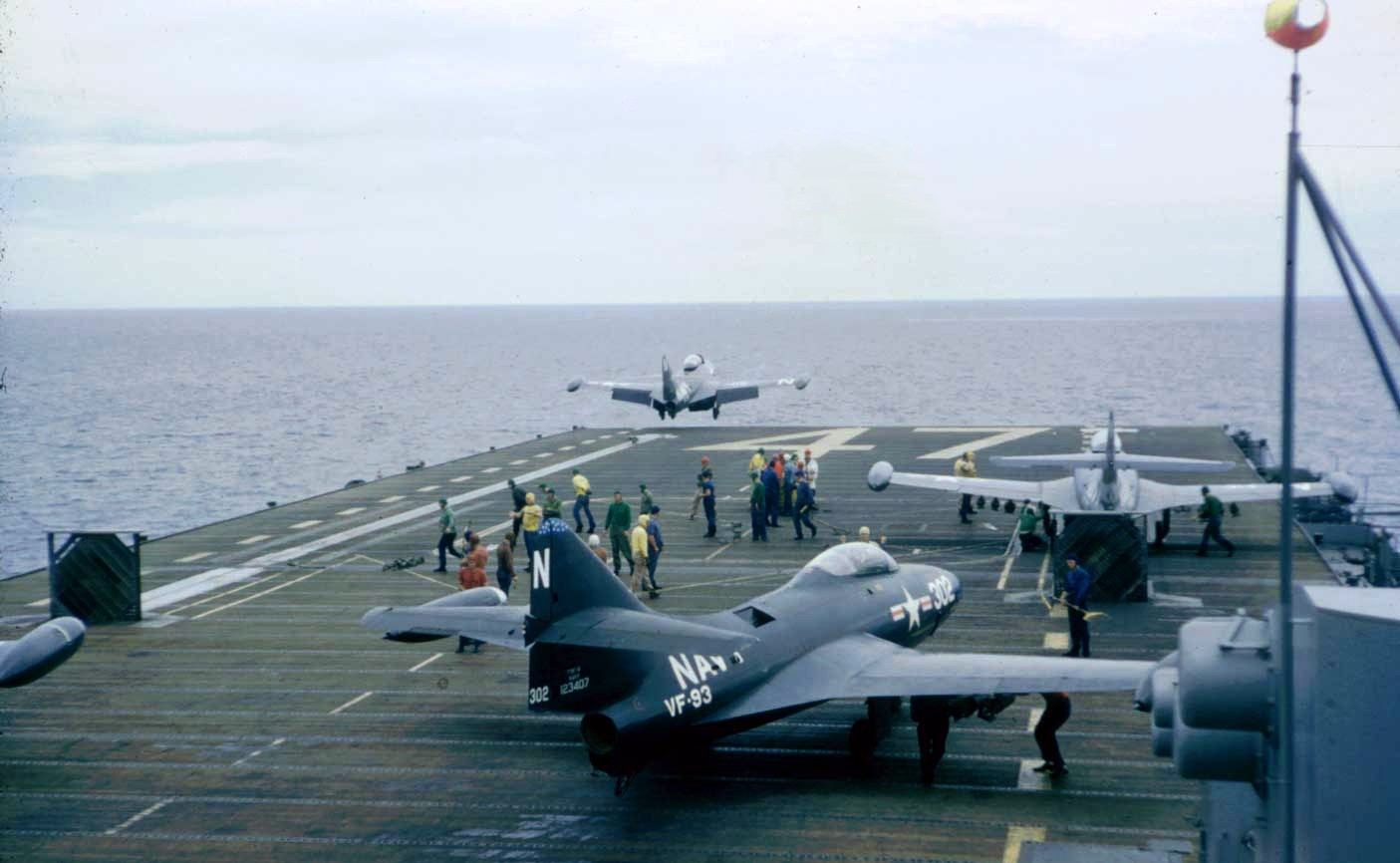
The "N" code on this F9F-2 Panther indicates assignment to CVG-9.

N

Assigned to	Assigned on	Notes
USS Hancock (CV-19)	8 January 1946, U.S. Navy Letter FF12-5	
Navy Air Reserve units at NAS Spokane	September 1948	Code changed to "5N" in 1956.
CVG-9, Carrier Air Group 9	1 July 1953	Tail code changed to "NG" in November 1956.

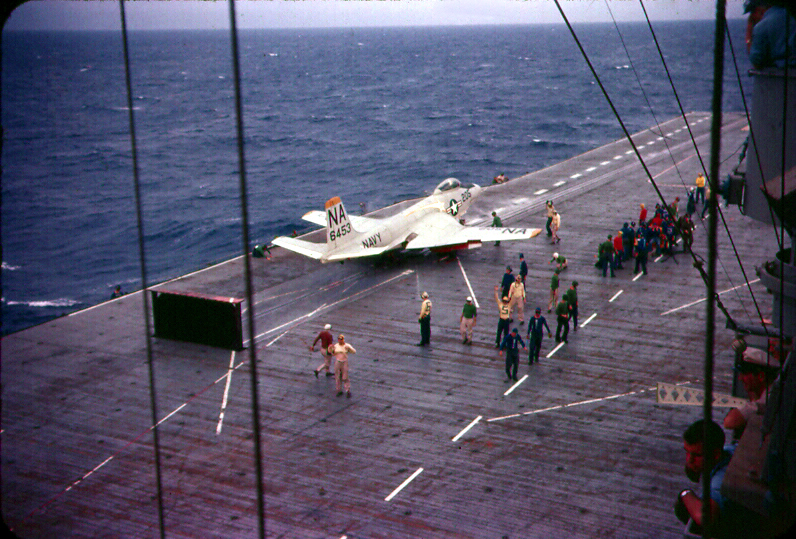
This F2H-3 Banshee of VF-52 is deployed with the ATG-1, hence the "NA" tail code.

NA

Assigned to	Assigned on	Notes
VC-4 Re-designated VF(AW)-4	September 1948	Disestablished in July 1959.
ATG-1, Air Task Group 1	November 1956	Inactivated in 1959.
VSF-1		
CVW-17, Carrier Air Wing 17	2012	

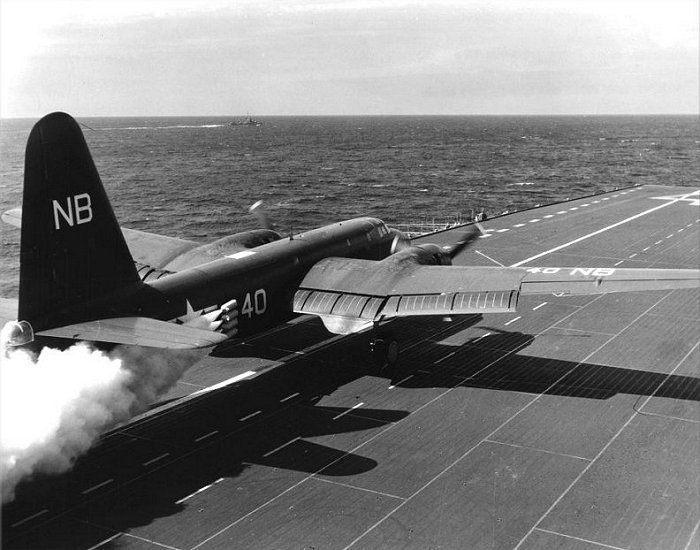
A P2V-3C of VC-5 takes off from the USS Midway in 1949.

NB

Assigned to	Assigned on	Notes
VC-5 Re-designated VAH-5	4 August 1948, U.S. Navy Letter ACL 69-48	
ATG-2, Air Task Group 2	November 1956	Inactivated in 1958.

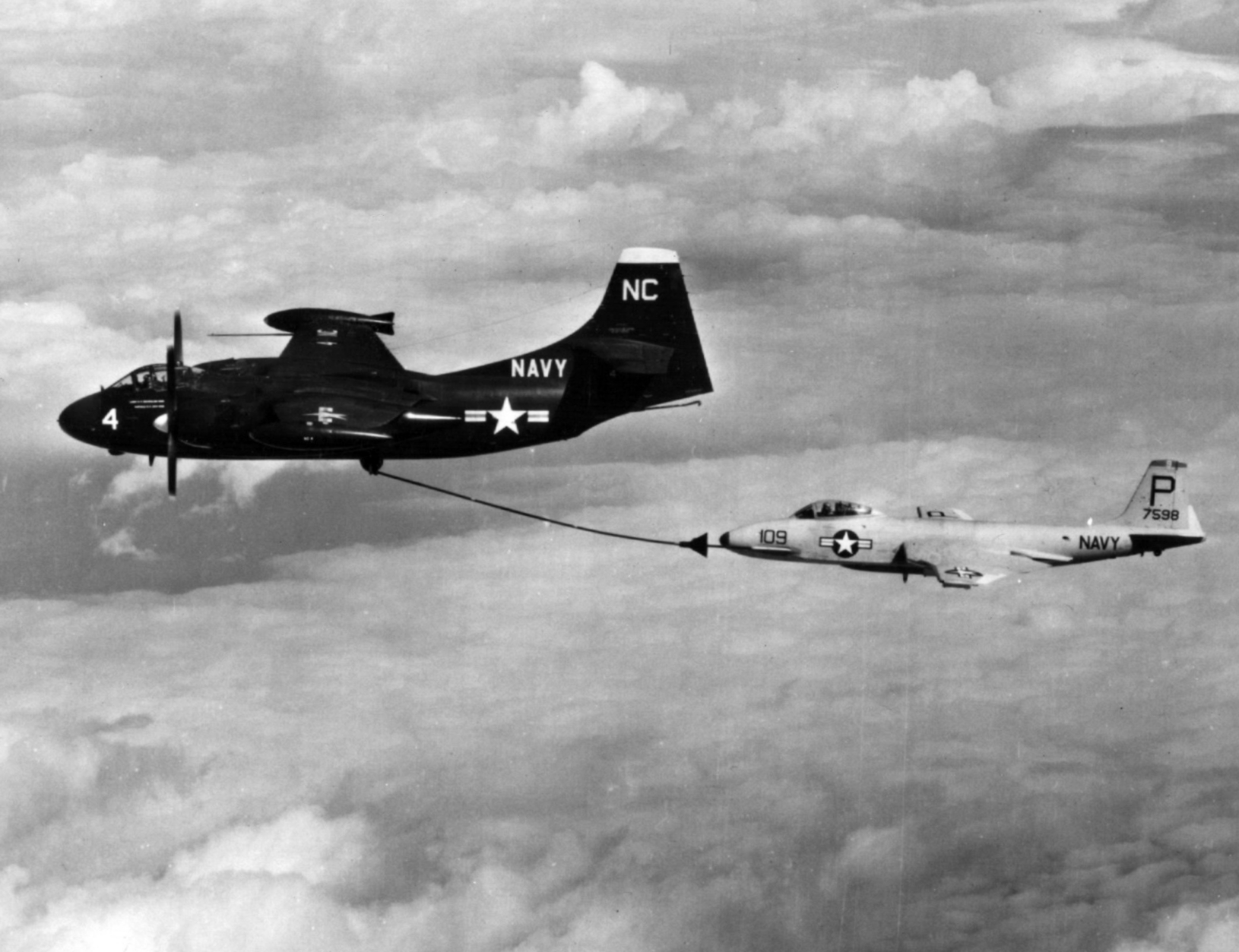
The AJ-2 Savage on this photograph shows the "NC" tail code of VC-8.

NC

Assigned to	Assigned on	Notes
VC-11	4 August 1948, U.S. Navy Letter ACL 69-48	
VC-8 Re-designated VAH-11	1951	
ATG-3, Air Task Group 3	November 1956	Inactivated in 1958.

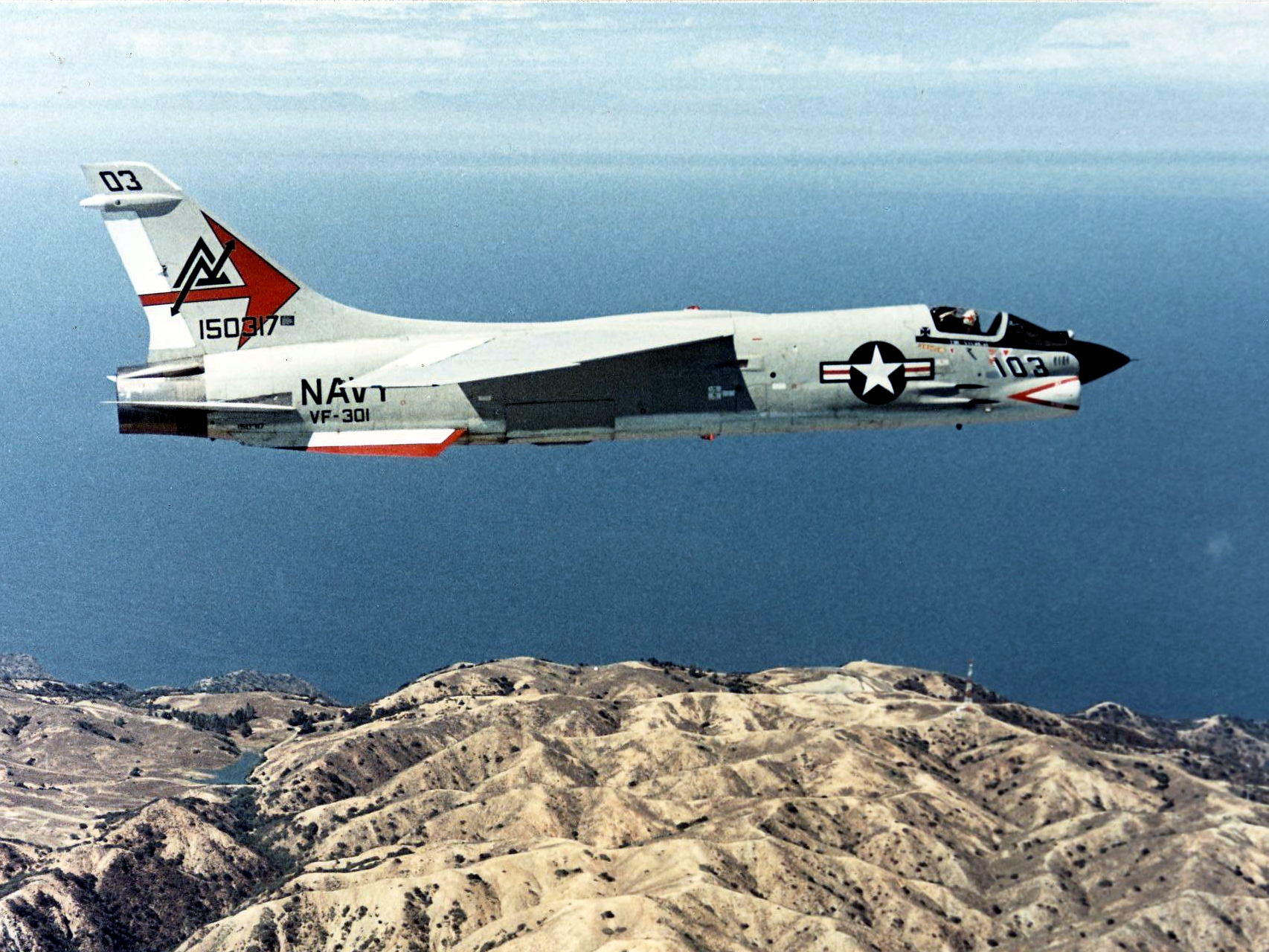
This F-8J Crusader of VF-301 sports a highly stylized "ND" code.

ND

Assigned to	Assigned on	Notes
VC-12	4 August 1948, U.S. Navy Letter ACL 69-48	
VC-11 Re-designated VAW-11	July 1948	
ATG-4, Air Task Group 4	November 1956	Inactivated in 1959.
CVWR-30, Reserve Carrier Air Wing 30	April 1970	

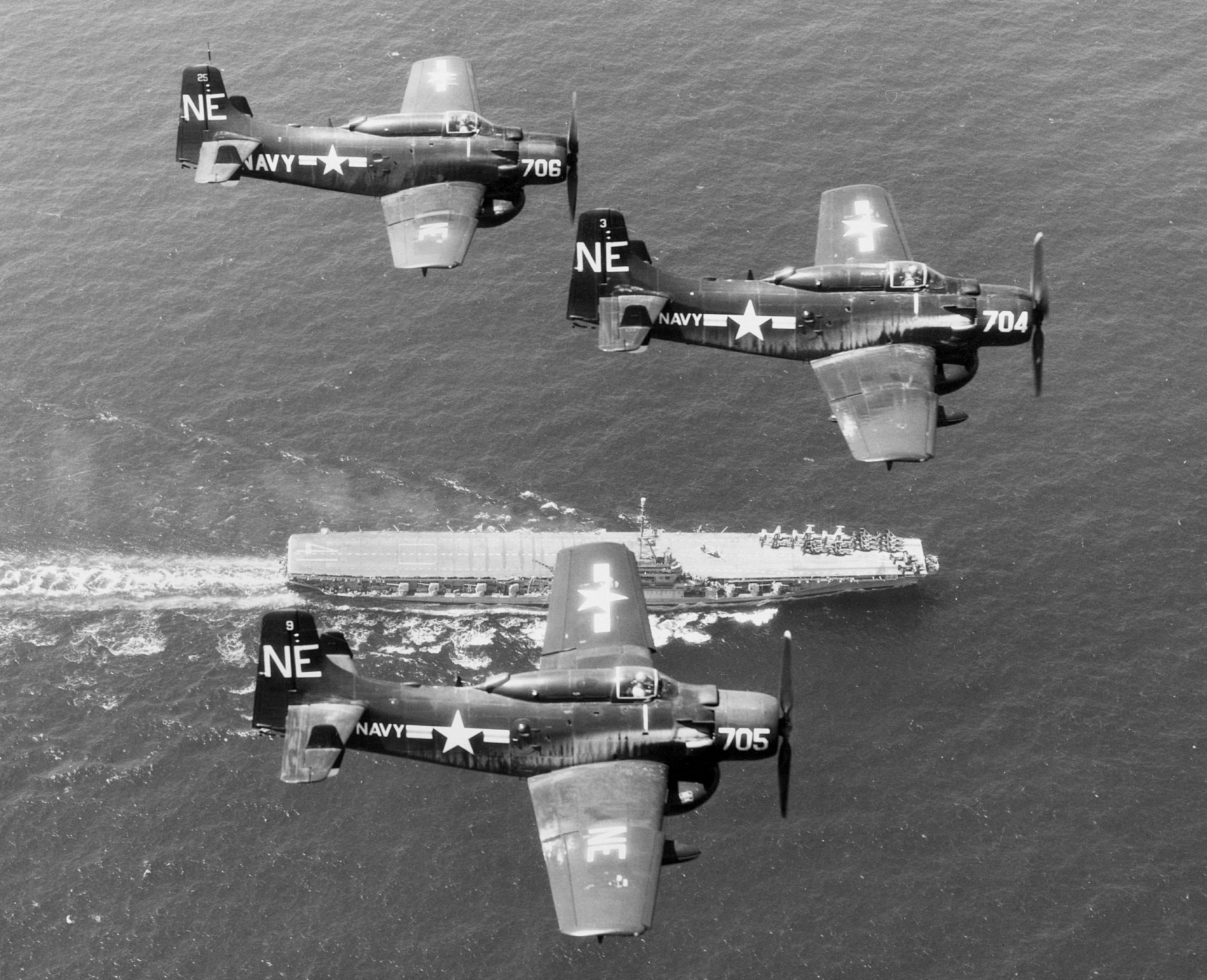
AD-4W Skyaiders from VC-12.

NE

Assigned to	Assigned on	Notes
VC-12 Re-designated VAW-11	July 1953	Decommissioned in September 1953.
CVG-2, Carrier Air Group 2 Re-designated CVW-2, Carrier Air Wing 2	November 1956	

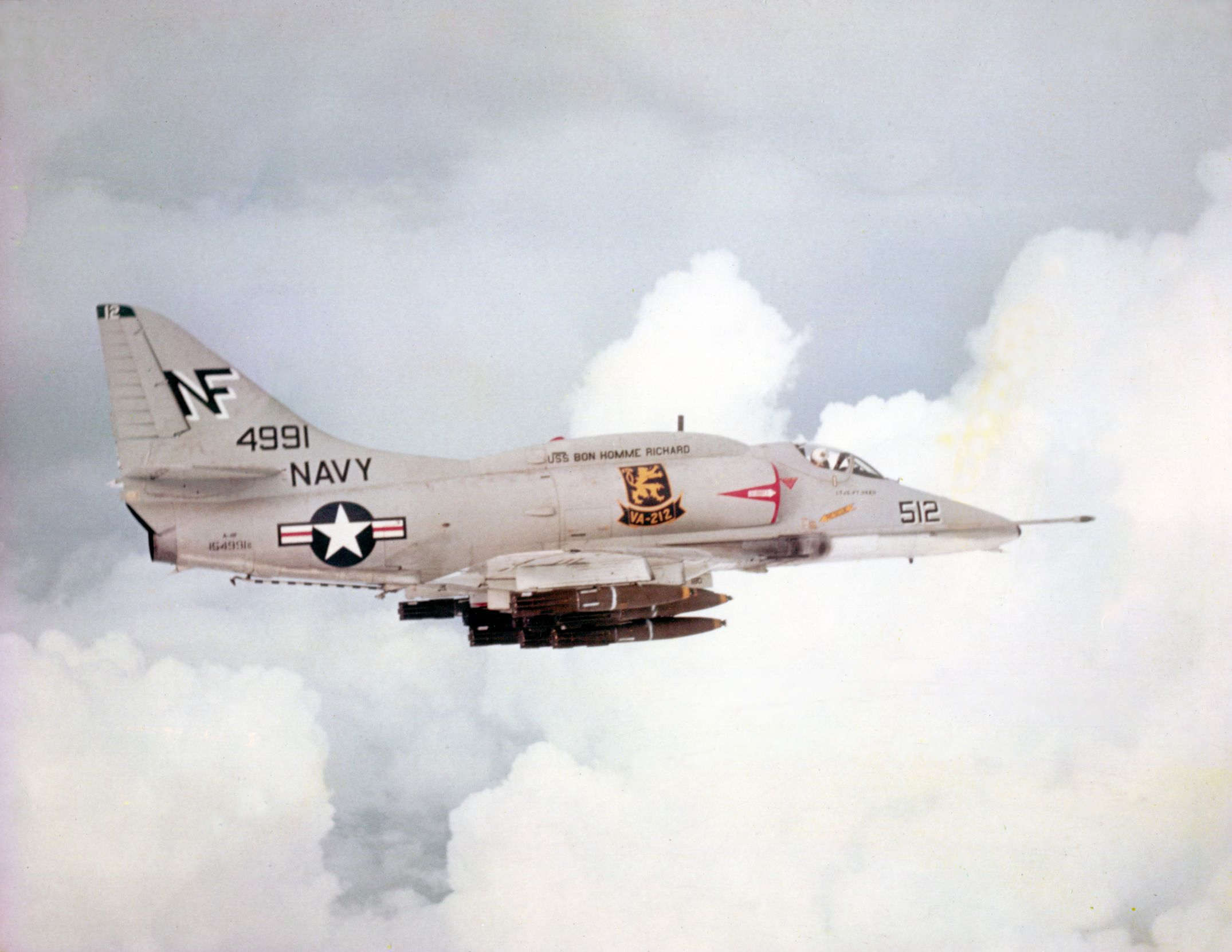
An A-4F Skyhawk of VA-212 on a combat mission.

NF

Assigned to	Assigned on	Notes
VC-6 Re-designated VAH-6	29 July 1950, U.S. Navy Letter ACL 43-50	
CVG-5, Carrier Air Group 5 Re-designated CVW-5, Carrier Air Wing 5	November 1956	

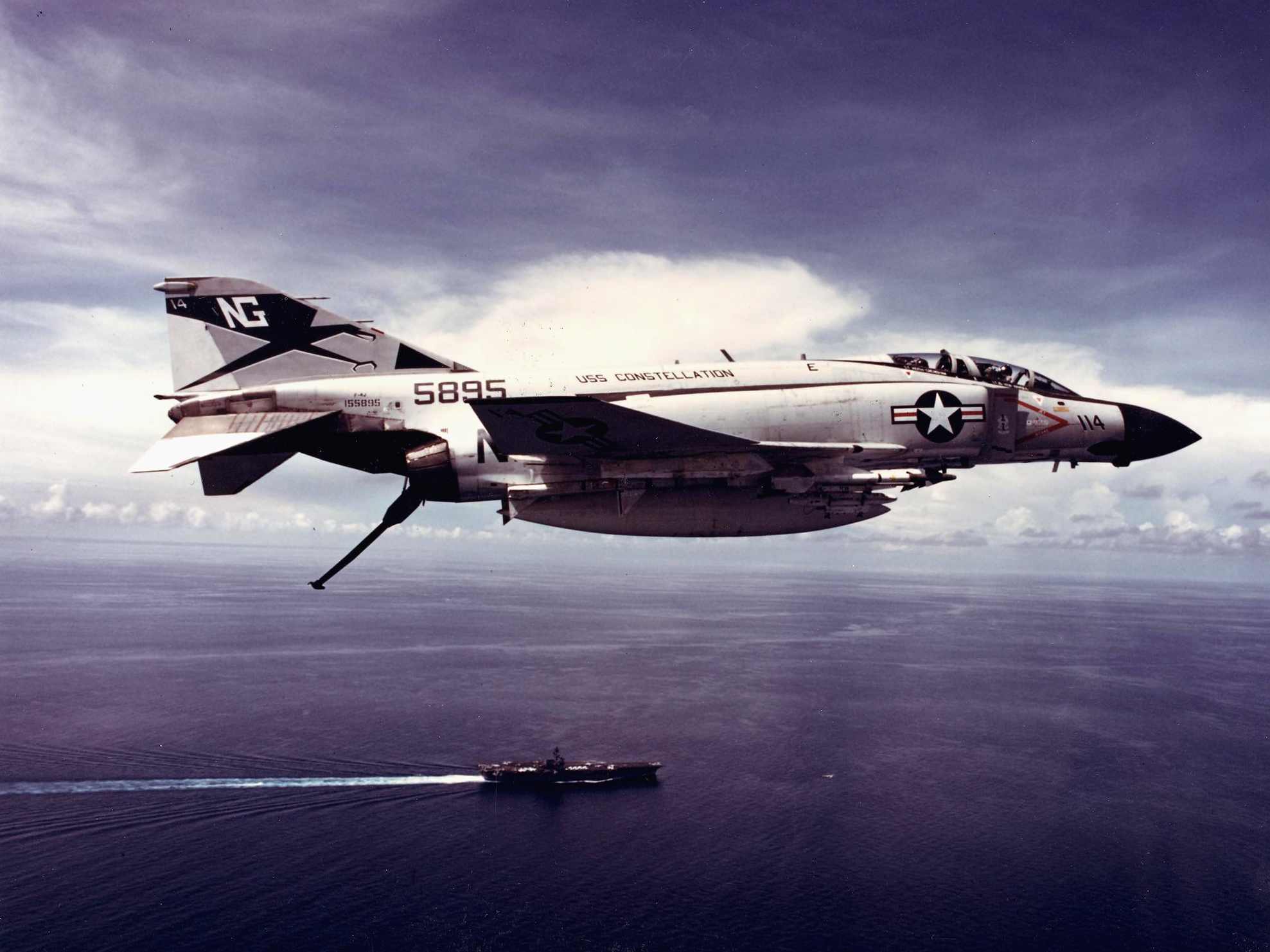
An F-4J Phantom II of VF-96 shows the "NG" tail code of CVW-9.

NG

Assigned to	Assigned on	Notes
CVG-9, Carrier Air Group 9 Re-designated CVW-9, Carrier Air Wing 9	November 1956	

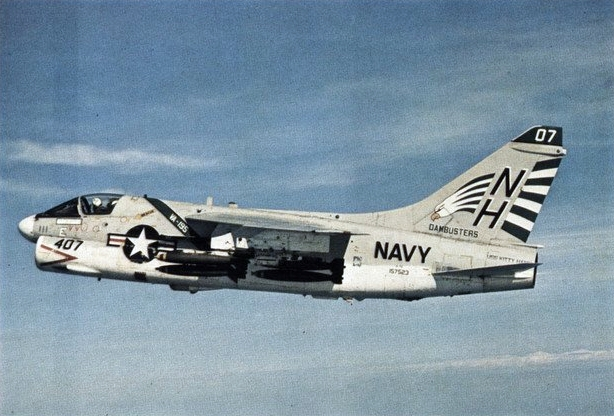
An A-7E Corsair II of VA-195 in 1972.

NH

Assigned to	Assigned on	Notes
VC-7 Re-designated VAH-7	July 1953	
CVG-11, Carrier Air Group 11 Re-designated CVW-11, Carrier Air Wing 11	November 1956	

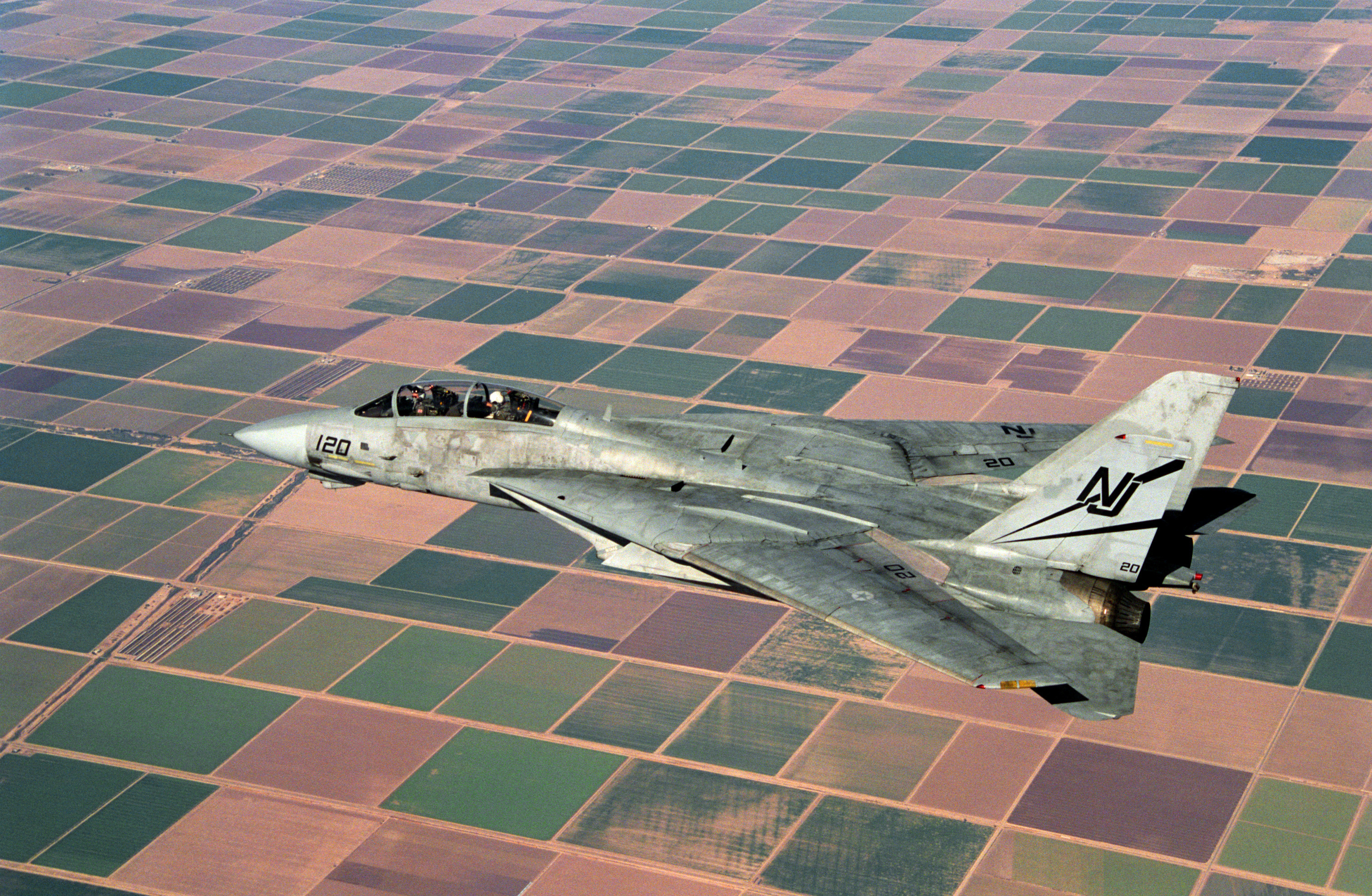
An F-14A Tomcat of VF-124.

NJ

Assigned to	Assigned on	Notes
RCVG-12, Replacement Carrier Air Group 12 Re-designated RCVW-12, Reserve Carrier Air Wing 12	April 1958	Disestablished in July 1970. RCVW-12 tail codes retained by VF-121, VF-124, VF-126, VA-122, VA-125, VA-127, VA-128.

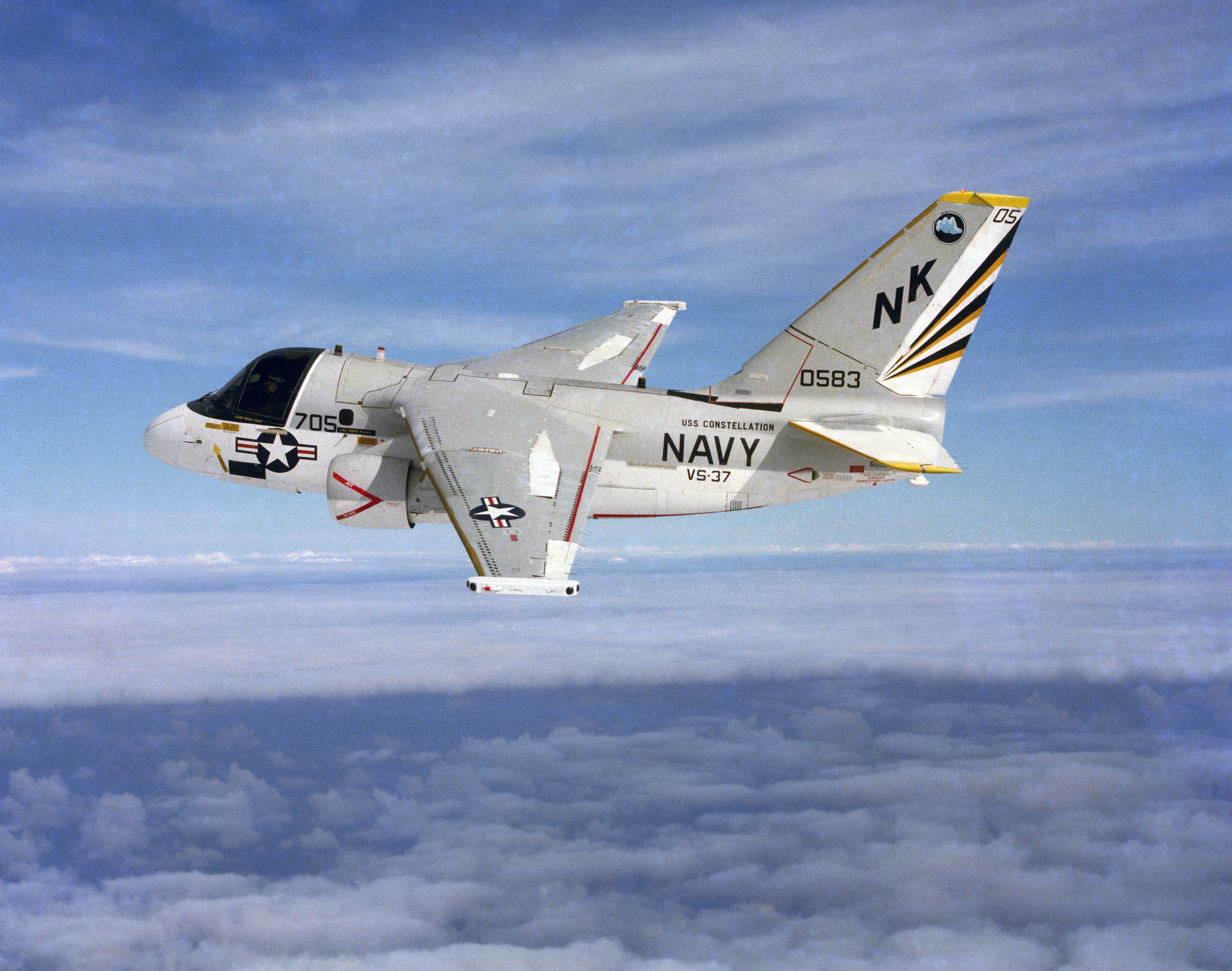
CVW-14 tail code is prominently displayed on this S-3A Viking of VS-37.

NK

Assigned to	Assigned on	Notes
CVG-14, Carrier Air Group 14 Re-designated CVW-14, Carrier Air Wing 14	November 1956	Disestablished in 2013.

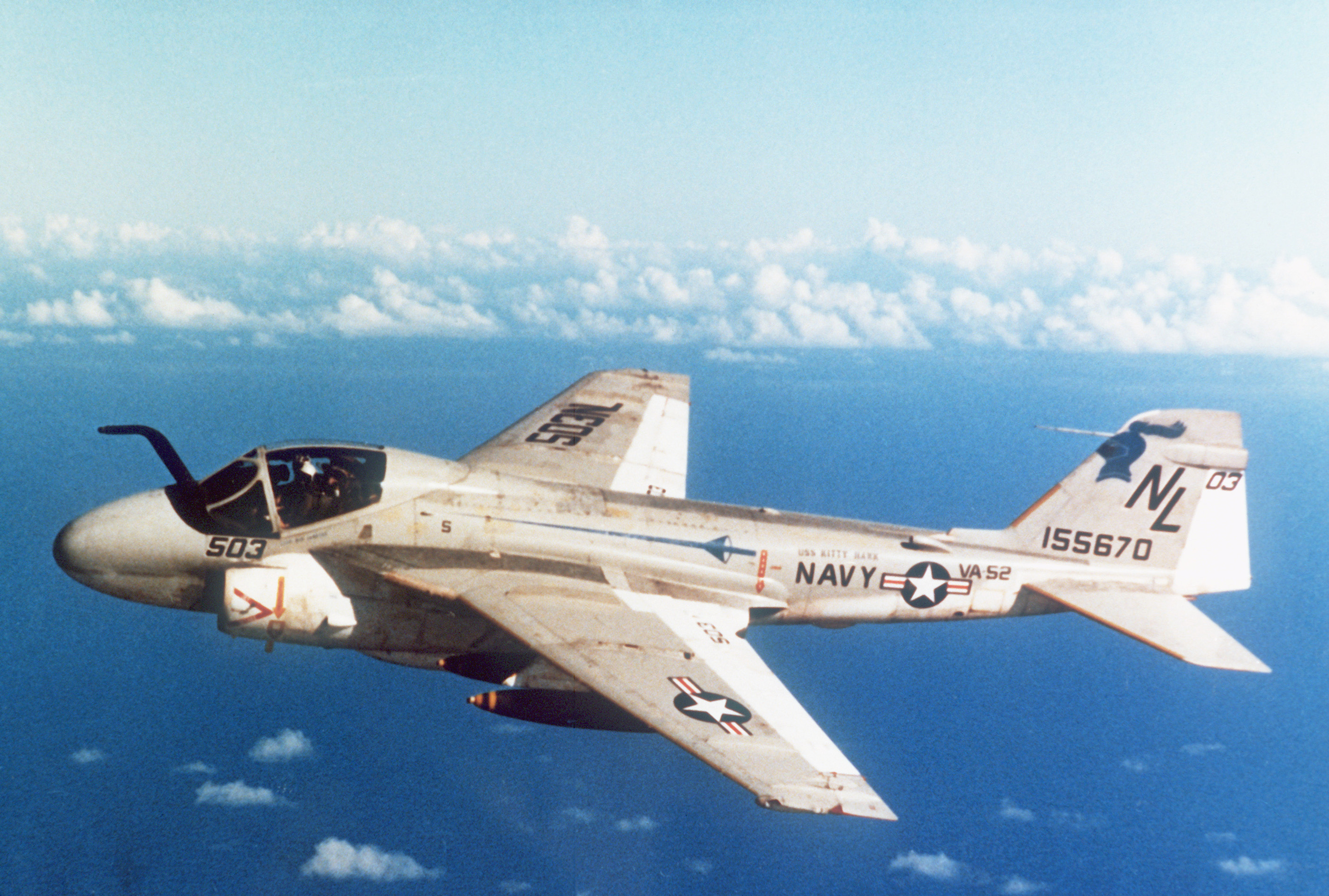
An A-6E Intruder of VA-52 shows the "NL" tail code of CVW-15.

NL

Assigned to	Assigned on	Notes
CVG-15, Carrier Air Group 15 Re-designated CVW-15, Carrier Air Wing 15	November 1956	Disestablished.
Electronic Combat Wing Pacific's Expeditionary (land based) Electronic Attack Squadrons (VAQ)	Upon CVW-15's disestablishment on 31 March 1995	The first VAQ squadron to be assigned the expeditionary (land based) role was VAQ-134 when the CVW it was assigned to (CVW-15) was disestablished. VAQ-134's aircraft retained the NL tail code and as more VAQ squadrons were assigned to the expeditionary squadron role the NL tail code was assigned to them as well.

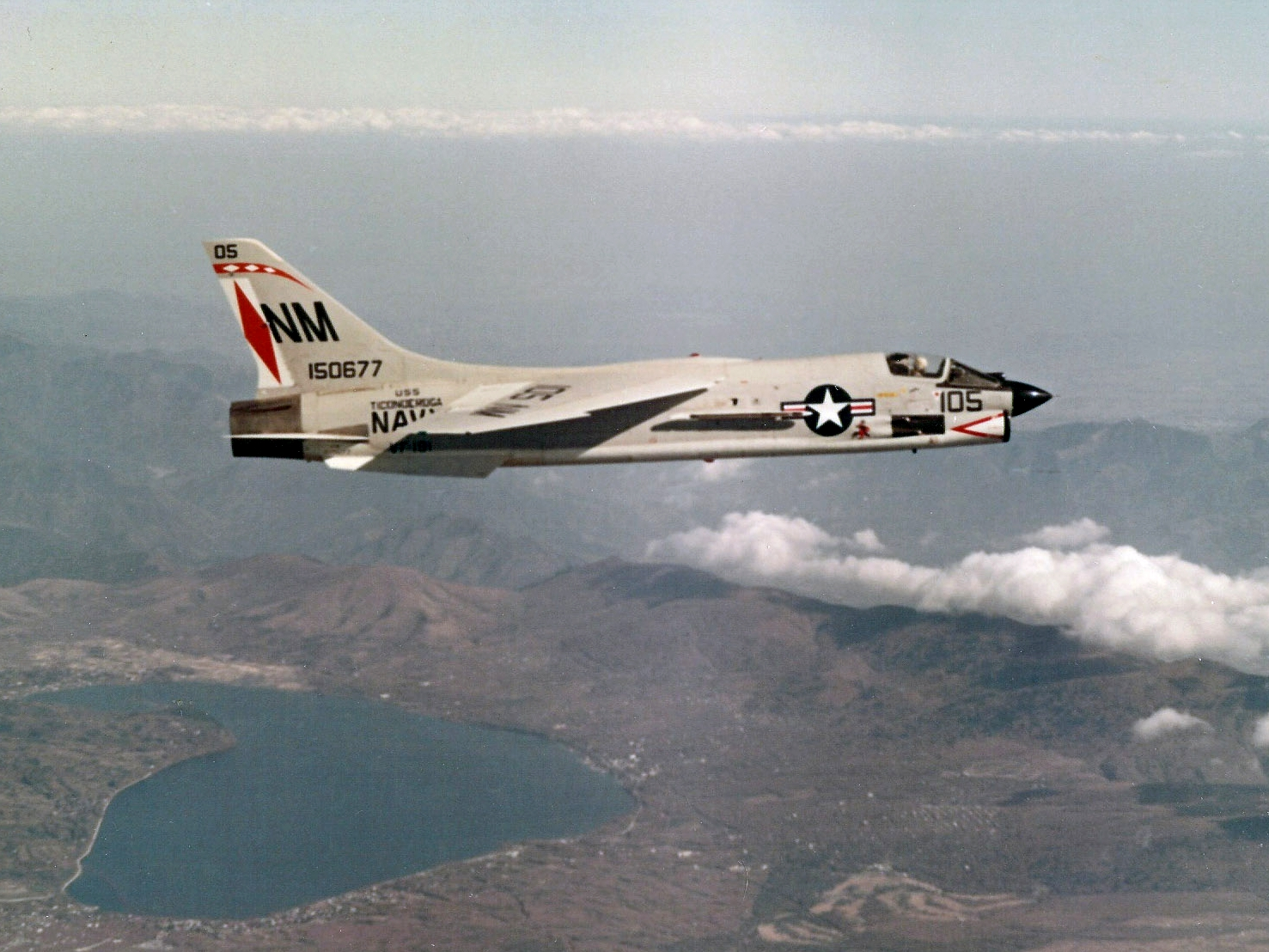
An F-8E Crusader of VF-191 in 1968.

NM

Assigned to	Assigned on	Notes
CVG-19, Carrier Air Group 19 Re-designated CVW-19, Carrier Air Wing 19	November 1956	Disestablished.

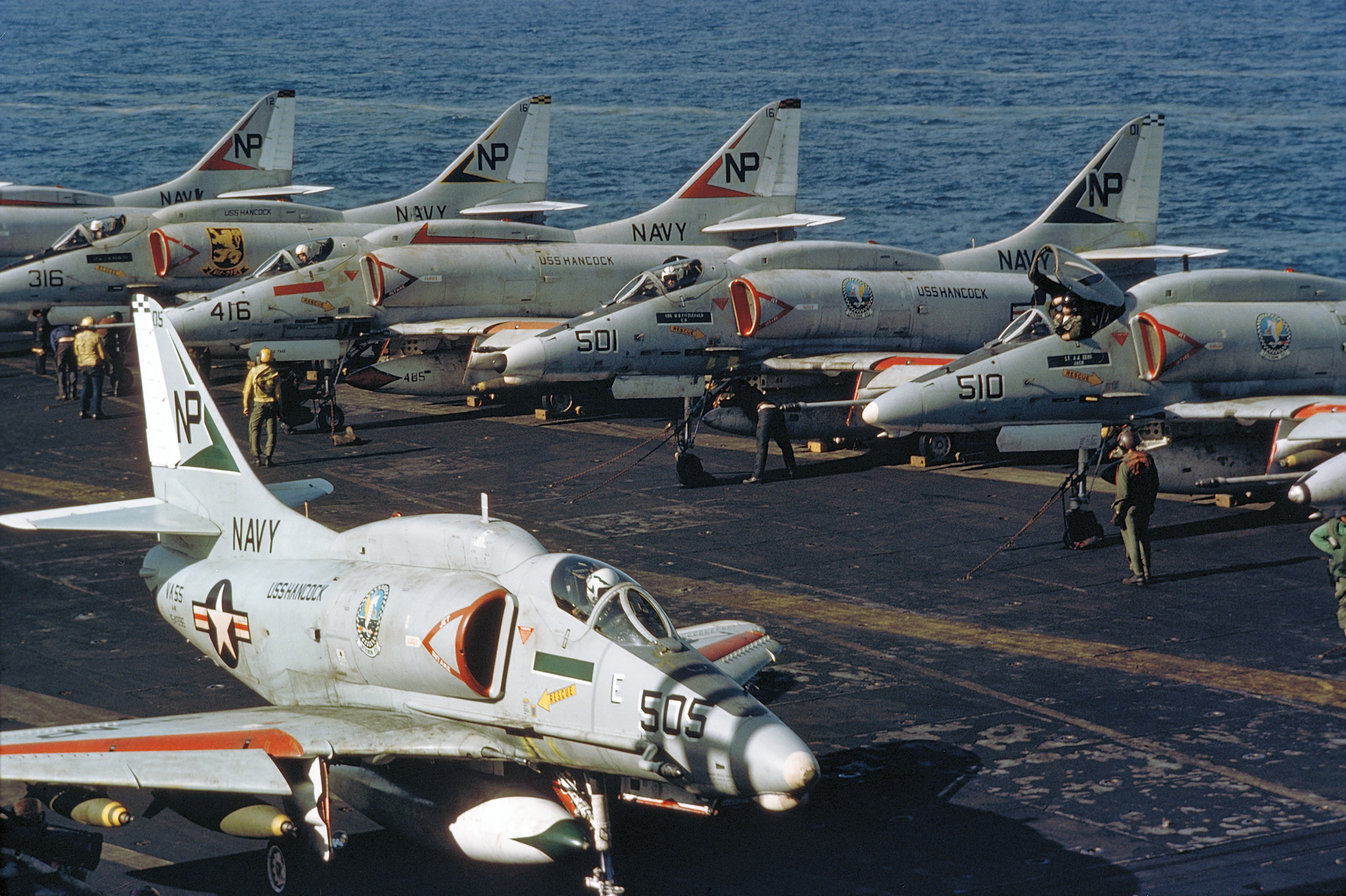
A-4 Skyhawks of CVW-21.

NP

Assigned to	Assigned on	Notes
VC-3 Re-designated VF(AW)-3	May 1949	Disestablished in May 1958
CVG-21, Carrier Air Group 21 Re-designated CVW-21, Carrier Air Wing 21	November 1956	Disestablished in December 1975.

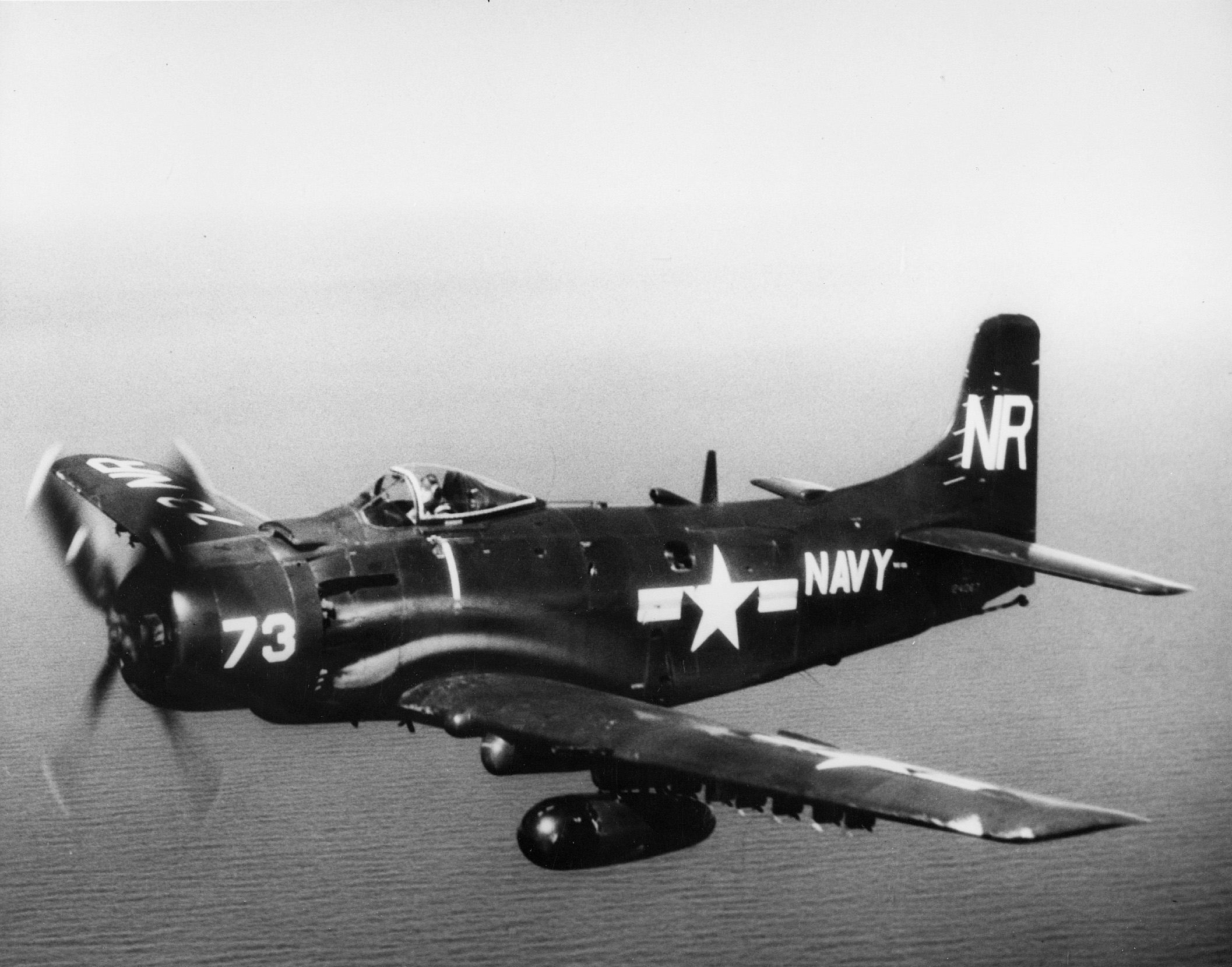
An AD-4Q Skyraider from VC-35.

NR

Assigned to	Assigned on	Notes
VC-35 Re-designated VA(AW)-35	May 1950	Code changed to "VV" in 1957.

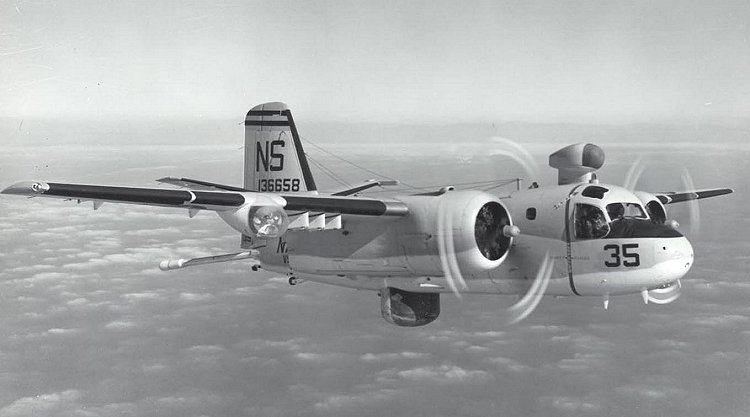
A Grumman S-2A Tracker of VS-29, assigned to CVGS-53.

NS

Assigned to	Assigned on	Notes
CVGS-53, Carrier Antisubmarine Warfare Air Group 53	1960	Disestablished in June 1973.

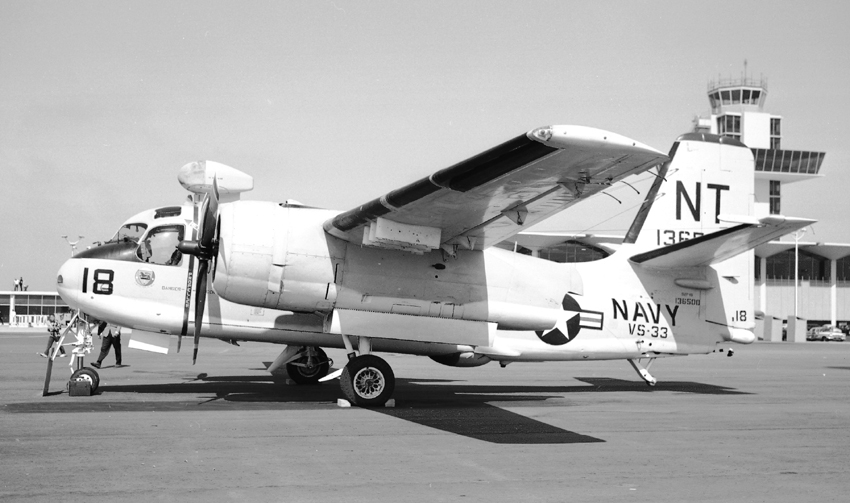
An S-2A Tracker of VS-33, assigned to CVGS-59.

NT

Assigned to	Assigned on	Notes
CVGS-59, Carrier Antisubmarine Warfare Air Group 59	1960	Disestablished in September 1968.

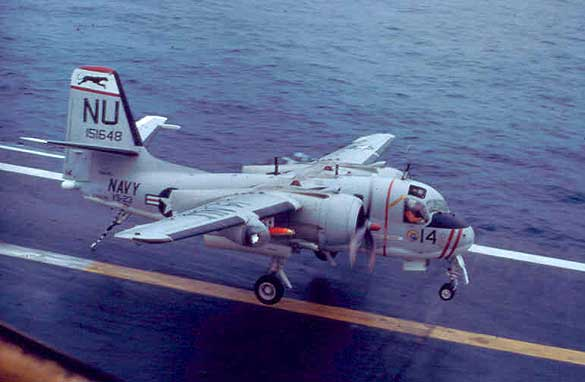
An S-2E Tracker of VS-23, assigned to CVGS-55.

NU

Assigned to	Assigned on	Notes
CVGS-55, Carrier Antisubmarine Warfare Air Group 55	September 1960	Disestablished in September 1968.

NV

Assigned to	Assigned on	Notes
CVGS-57, Carrier Antisubmarine Warfare Air Group 57	June 1960	Disestablished in September 1969.

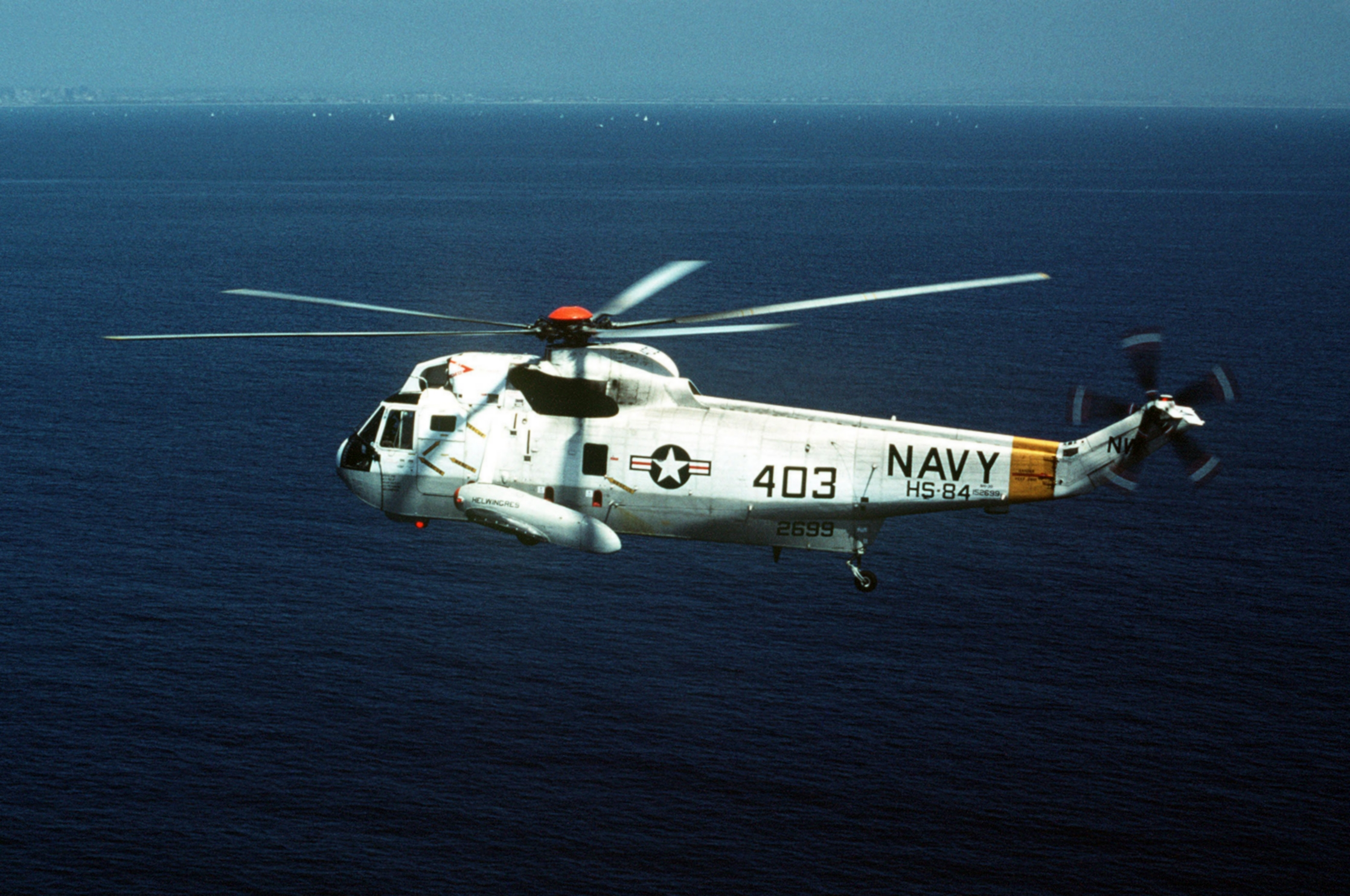
An SH-3D Sea King of HS-84 in 1983.

NW

Assigned to	Assigned on	Notes
CVSR-80, Reserve Carrier Antisubmarine Warfare Air Group 80	1970	Disestablished. CVSR-80 tail codes were retained by its squadrons.
Antisubmarine Helicopter Wing, Reserve	1989	Comprised HCS-4, HCS-5, HM-18, HM-19, HS-75, HS-85, HSL-74, HSL-84 and HSL-94. Disestablished.
Navy Reserve Helicopter Squadrons		Though the wing disestablished, Navy Reserve Helicopter Squadrons continue to display NW

NY

Assigned to	Assigned on	Notes
VMGR-452	September 1988	Deactivated December 2022

O

Assigned to	Assigned on	Notes
ATG-182, Air Task Group 182	1955	Inactivated in 1959.

P

Assigned to	Assigned on	Notes
USS Belleau Wood (CVL-24)	July 1945	
USS Princeton (CV-37)	8 January 1946, U.S. Navy Letter FF12-5	
Headquarters Squadron Aircraft Fleet Marine Force Pacific	7 November 1946, U.S. Navy Letter ACL 156-46	
CVG-13, Carrier Air Group 13	12 December 1946, U.S. Navy Letter ACL 165-46	
Navy Air Reserve units at NAS Denver	November 1946	The "P" code issued to this NAS was a controlled duplicate of the same code letter given to CVG-10. Code changed to "7P" in 1956.
CVG-13, Carrier Air Group 10	July 1953	Tail code changed to "AK" in November 1956.

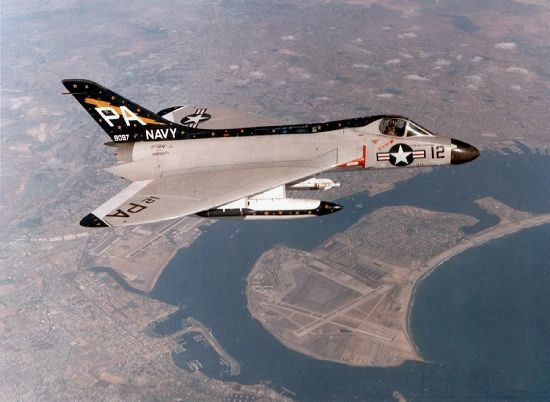
A VF(AW)-3 F4D-1 Skyray carries the squadron's "PA" tail code.

PA

Assigned to	Assigned on	Notes
USS Palau (CVE-122)	7 November 1946, U.S. Navy Letter ACL 156-46	
HEDRON-15, Headquarters Squadron Marine Air Group 15	7 November 1946, U.S. Navy Letter ACL 156-46	
Night Development Squadron Pacific Subsequently, re-designated VCN-1, FAWTUPAC (Fleet All Weather Training Unit Pacific) and VF(AW)-3	7 November 1946, U.S. Navy Letter ACL 156-46	Disestablished in March 1963.
VMF-461	12 December 1946, U.S. Navy Letter ACL 165-46	Disestablished in September 1950.
Attack units of Navy Air Reserve at NAS Denver	November 1946	A very short-lived assignment.
IBTU, Instructor Basic Training Unit	August 1950	

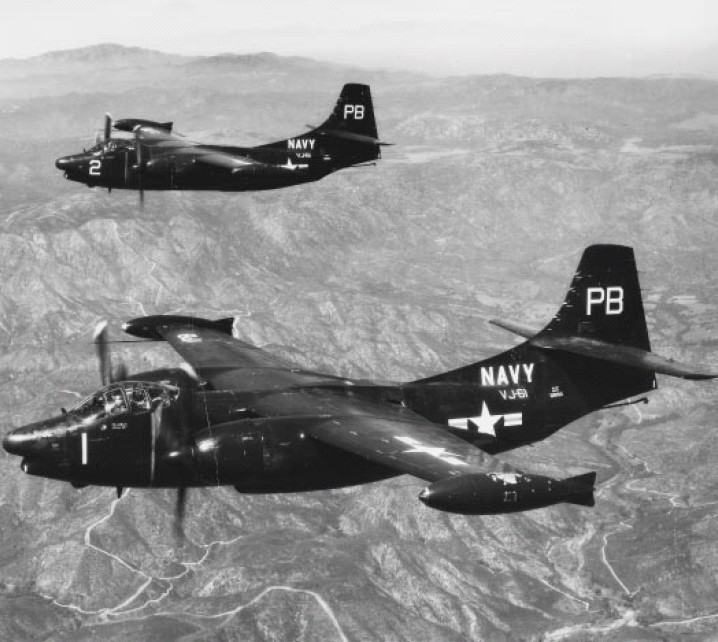
A pair of AJ-2P Savages assigned to VAP-61.

PB

Assigned to	Assigned on	Notes
VMR-352	7 November 1946, U.S. Navy Letter ACL 156-46	
VJ-61 Re-designated VAP-61	1953	Tail code changed to "SS" in 1957.
FAETUPAC, Fleet Airborne Electronics Training Unit Pacific	1957	Disestablished in 1959.

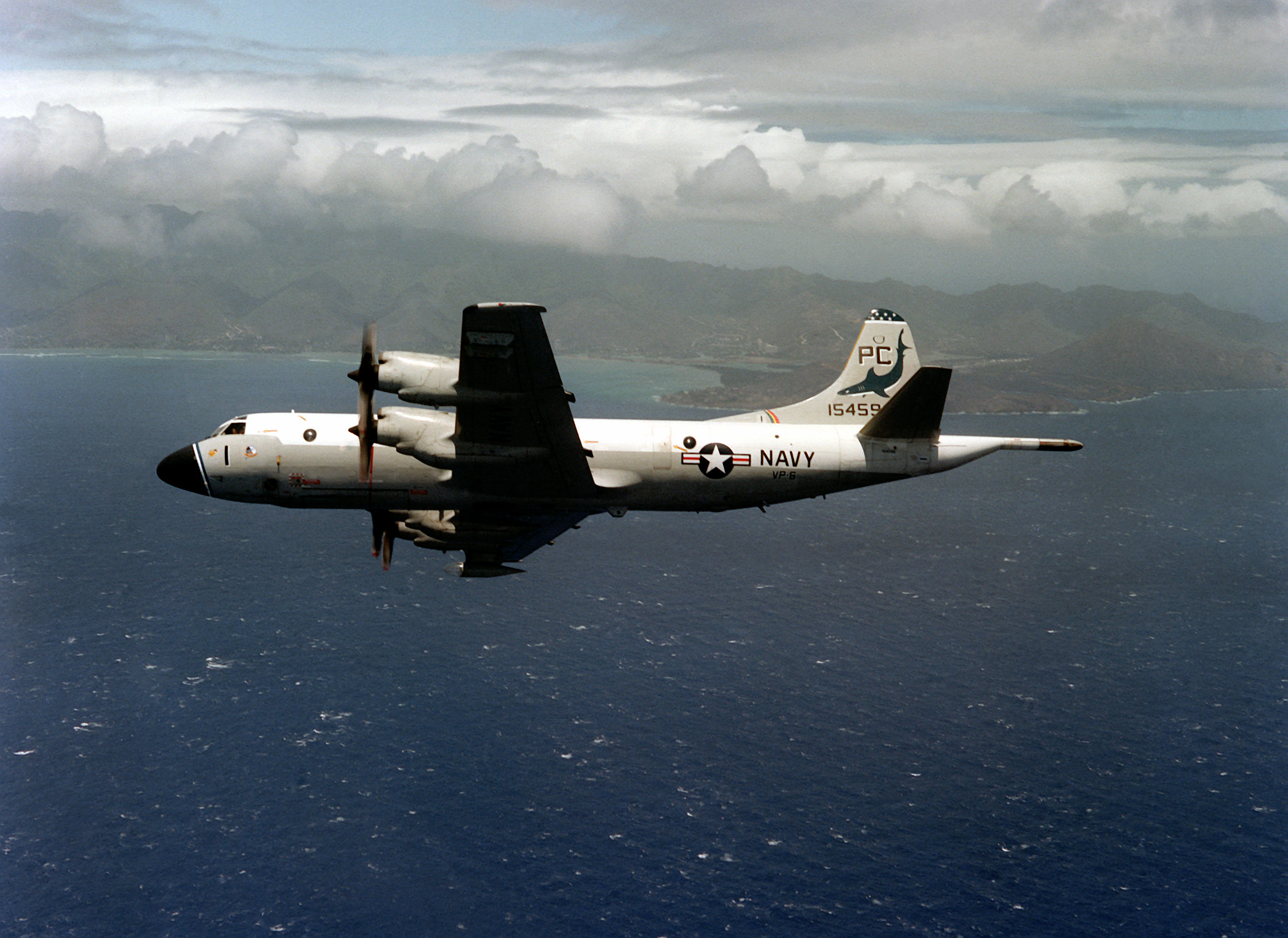
A P-3B Orion assigned to VP-6.

PC

Assigned to	Assigned on	Notes
VMR-953	7 November 1946, U.S. Navy Letter ACL 156-46	Disestablished in May 1947.
VP-6	1957	Disestablished in May 1993.

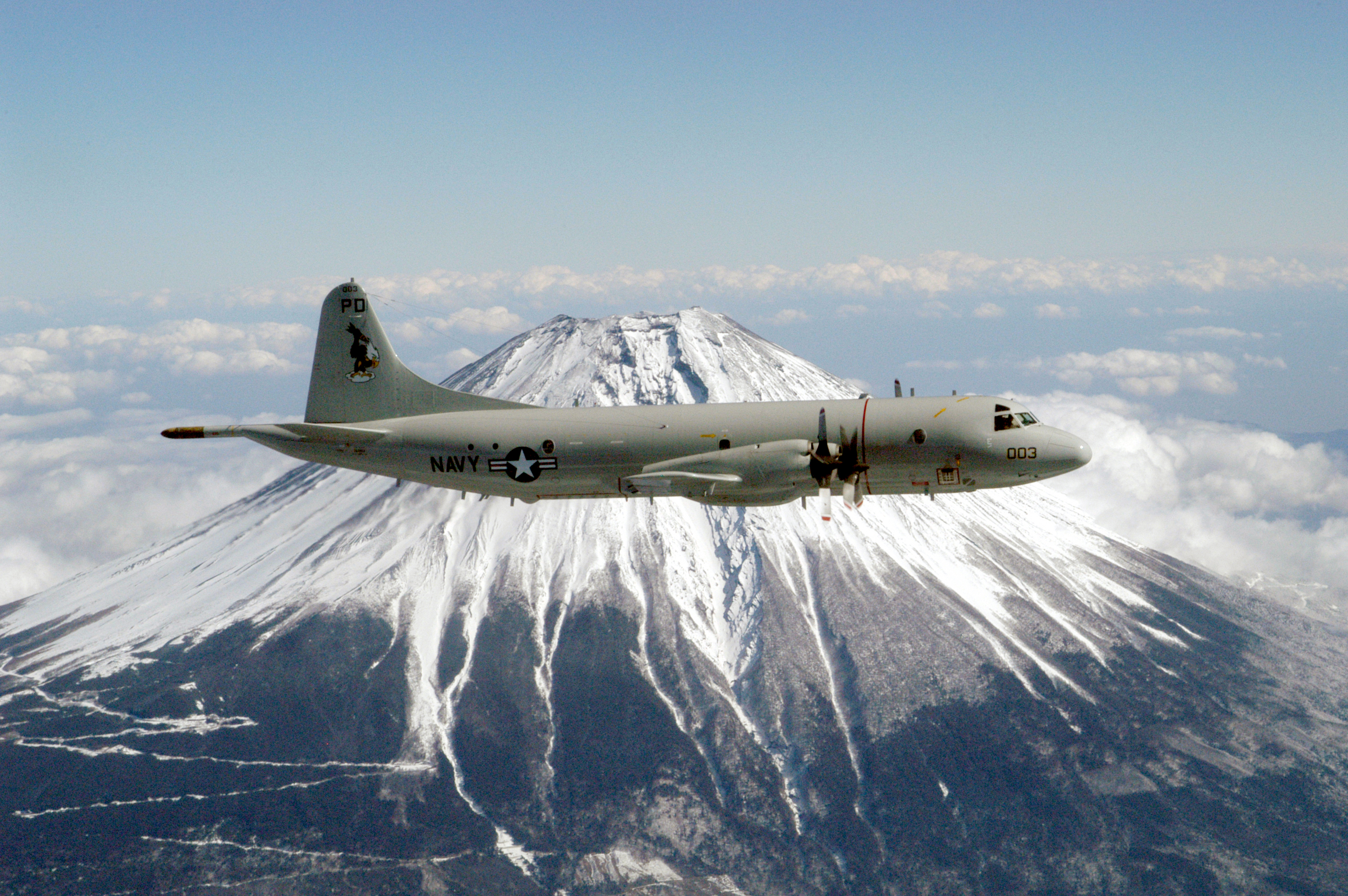
A P-3B Orion assigned to VP-9.

PD

Assigned to	Assigned on	Notes
VMF-322	7 November 1946, U.S. Navy Letter ACL 156-46	
VP-9	1957	

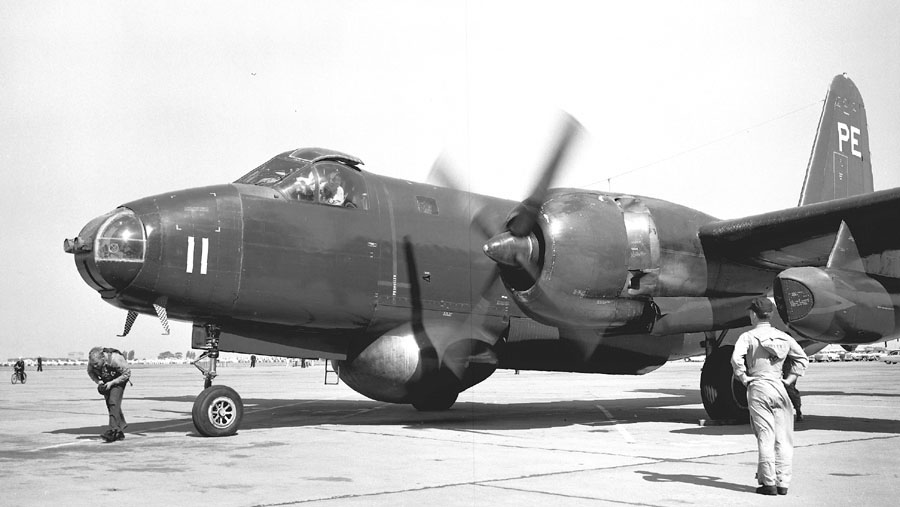
A P2V-7 assigned to VP-19.

PE

Assigned to	Assigned on	Notes
VP-19	1957	Disestablished in August 1991.
VUP-19	2016	

PF

Assigned to	Assigned on	Notes
VS-23	1957	
HML-364 Subsequently, re-designated HMM-364 and VMM-364	1961	

PG

Assigned to	Assigned on	Notes
VP-65	November 1970	Disestablished in March 2006.

PH

Assigned to	Assigned on	Notes
VMM-561	December 2010	Disestablished in July 2012.

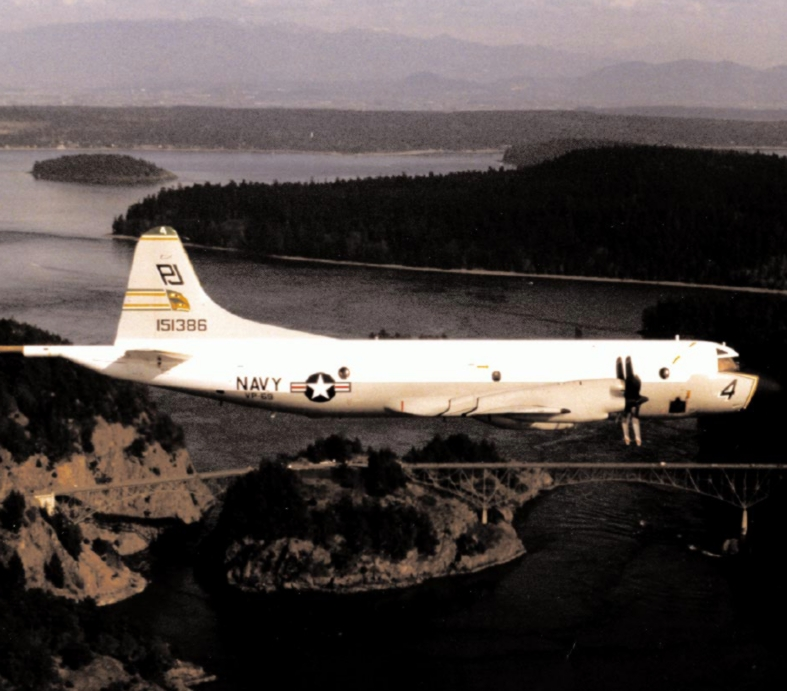
A P-3A Orion assigned to VP-69.

PJ

Assigned to	Assigned on	Notes
VP-69	November 1970	

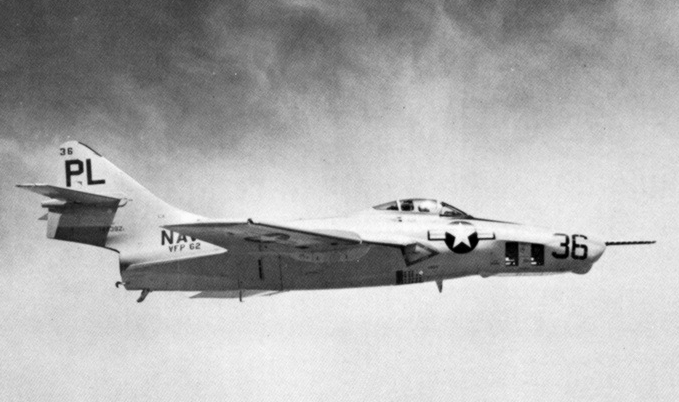
An F9F-8P Cougar of VFP-62 in flight.

PL

Assigned to	Assigned on	Notes
VC-62 Re-designated VFP-62	January 1949	Disestablished in January 1968.
VP-67	November 1970	Disestablished in September 1994.

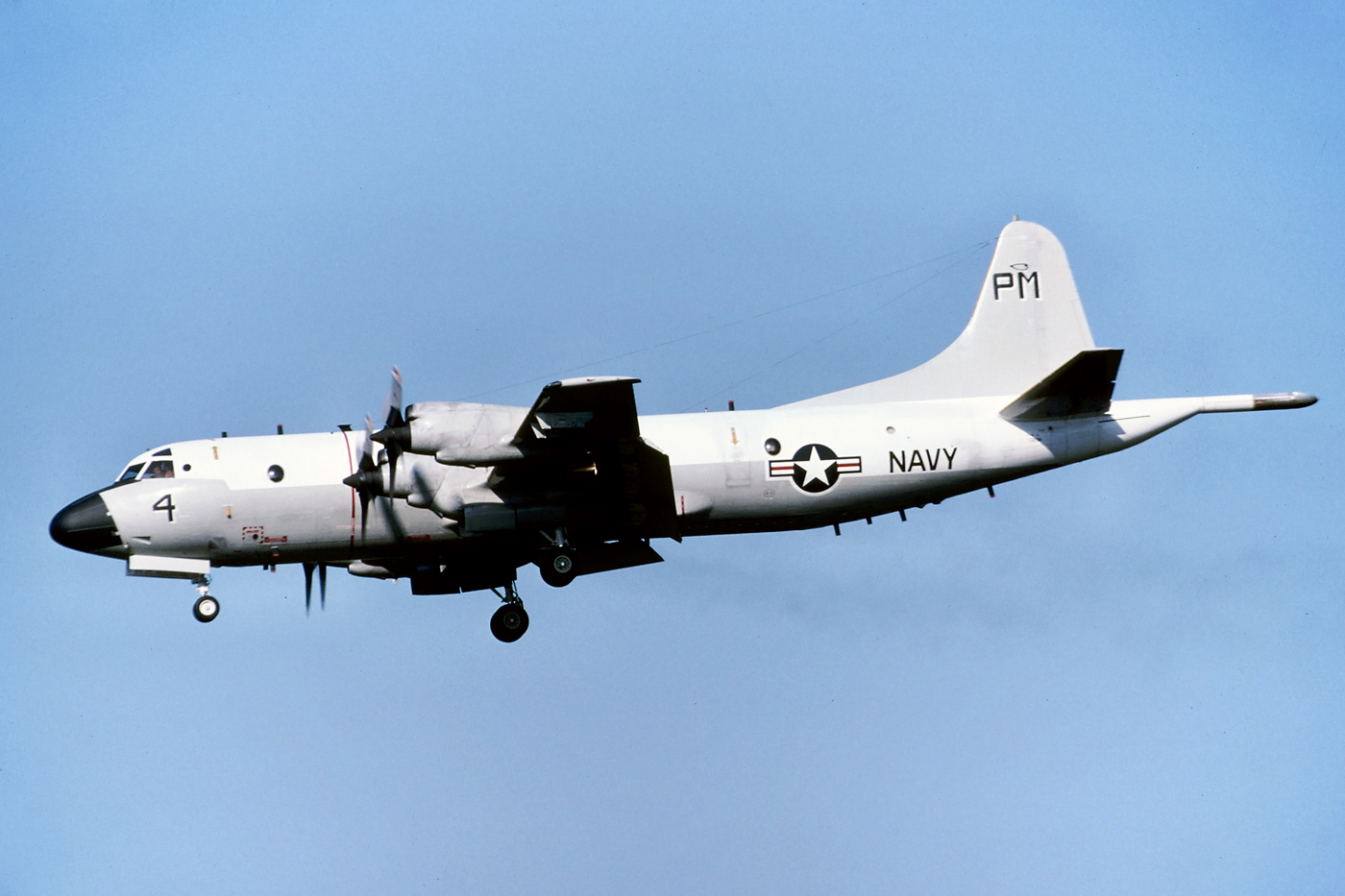
A P-3C Orion of VP-91.

PM

Assigned to	Assigned on	Notes
VJ-1 Re-designated VW-3	March 1952	
VP-91	November 1970	Disestablished in March 1999.

PN

Assigned to	Assigned on	Notes
VJ-2 Re-designated VW-4	March 1952	Tail code changed to "TH" in mid 1950s.

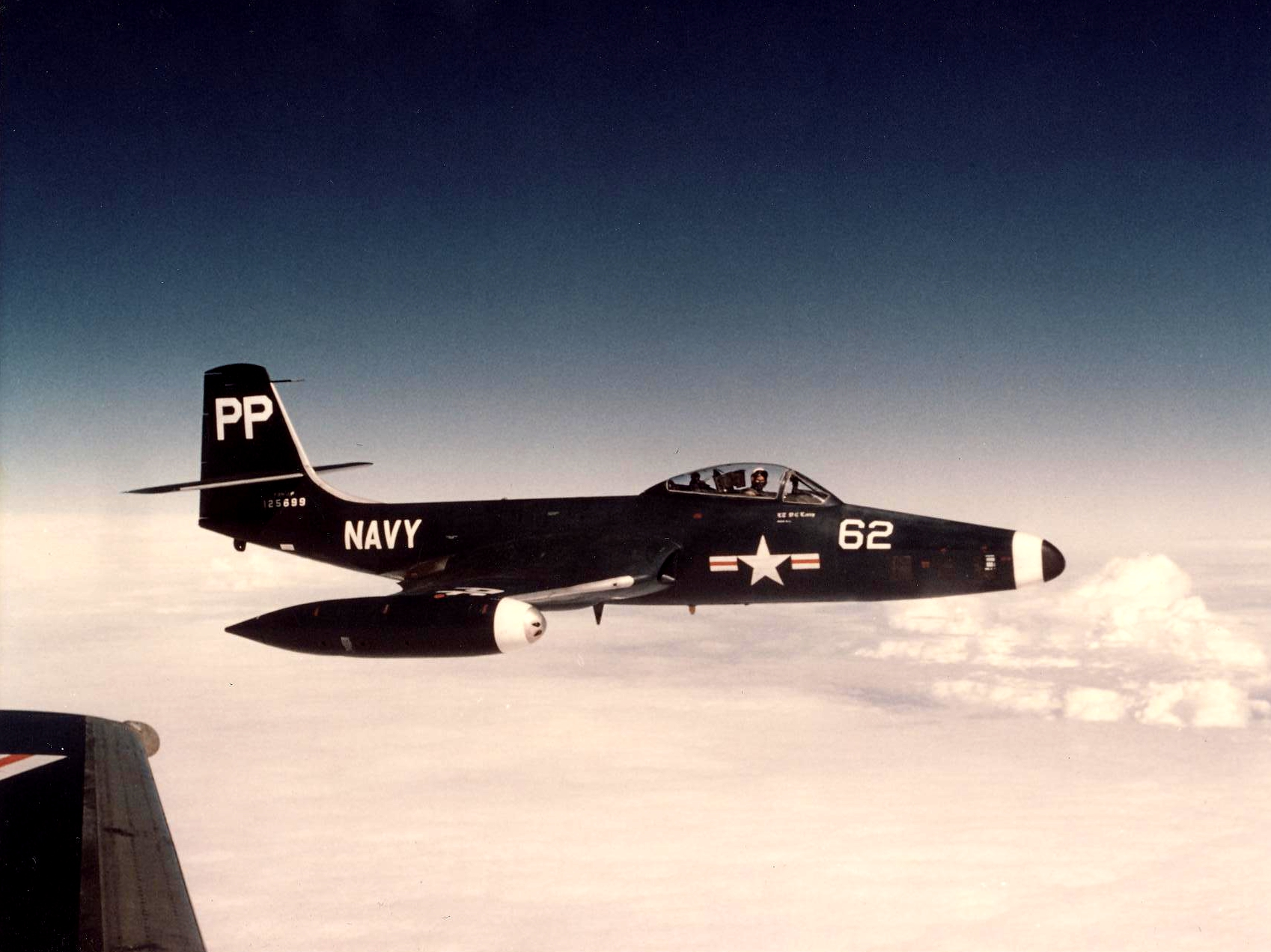
An F2H-2P Banshee of VC-61 in flight.

PP

Assigned to	Assigned on	Notes
USS Ranger (CV-4)	July 1945	
USS Langley (CVL-27)	8 January 1946, U.S. Navy Letter FF12-5	
VC-61 Subsequently, re-designated VFP-61, VCP-63 and VFP-63	1949	Disestablished in September 1982.

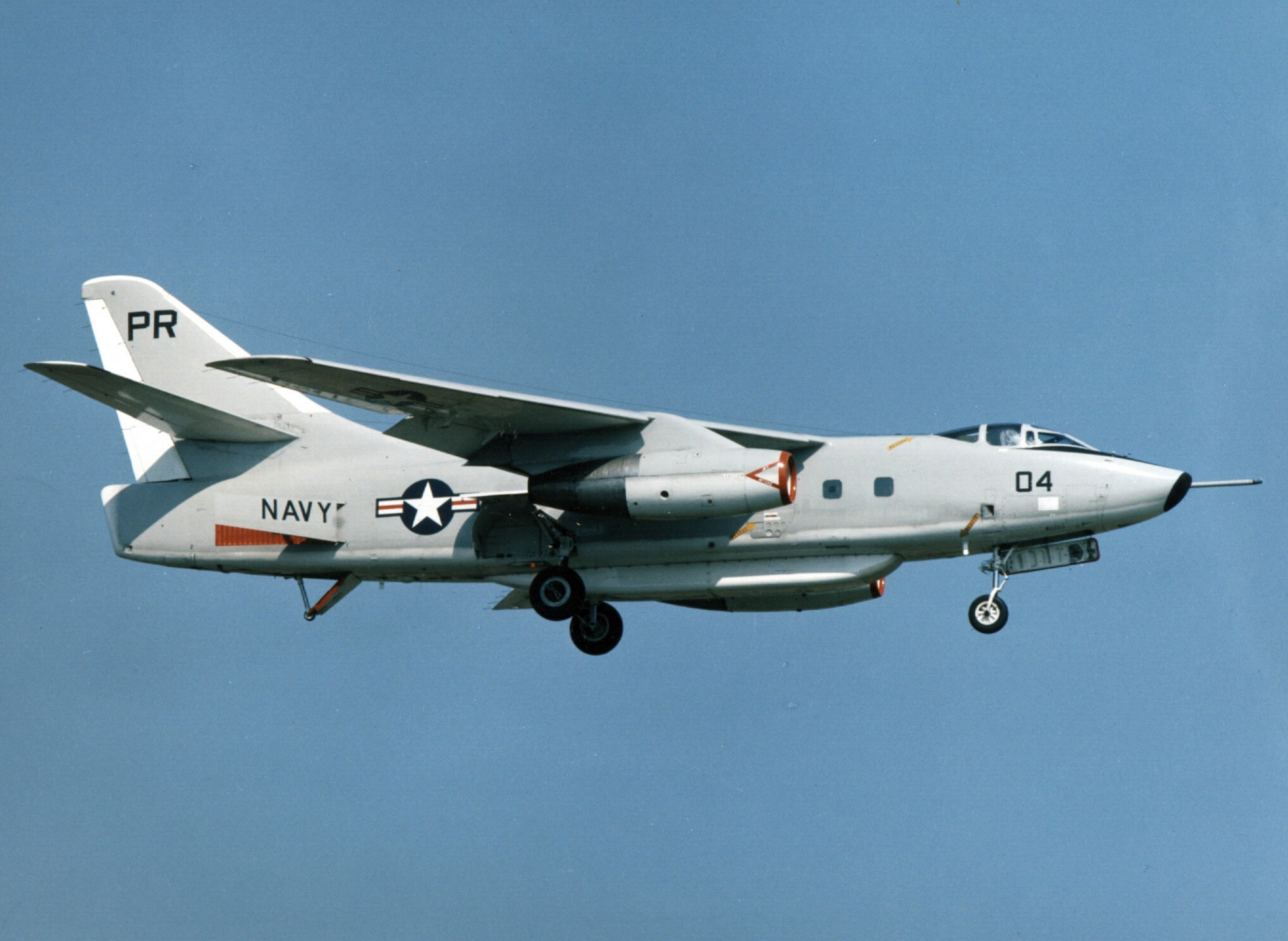
VQ-1 tail code "PR" is prominently displayed on this EA-3B Skywarrior.

PR

Assigned to	Assigned on	Notes
VQ-1	1955	Disestablished in March 2025

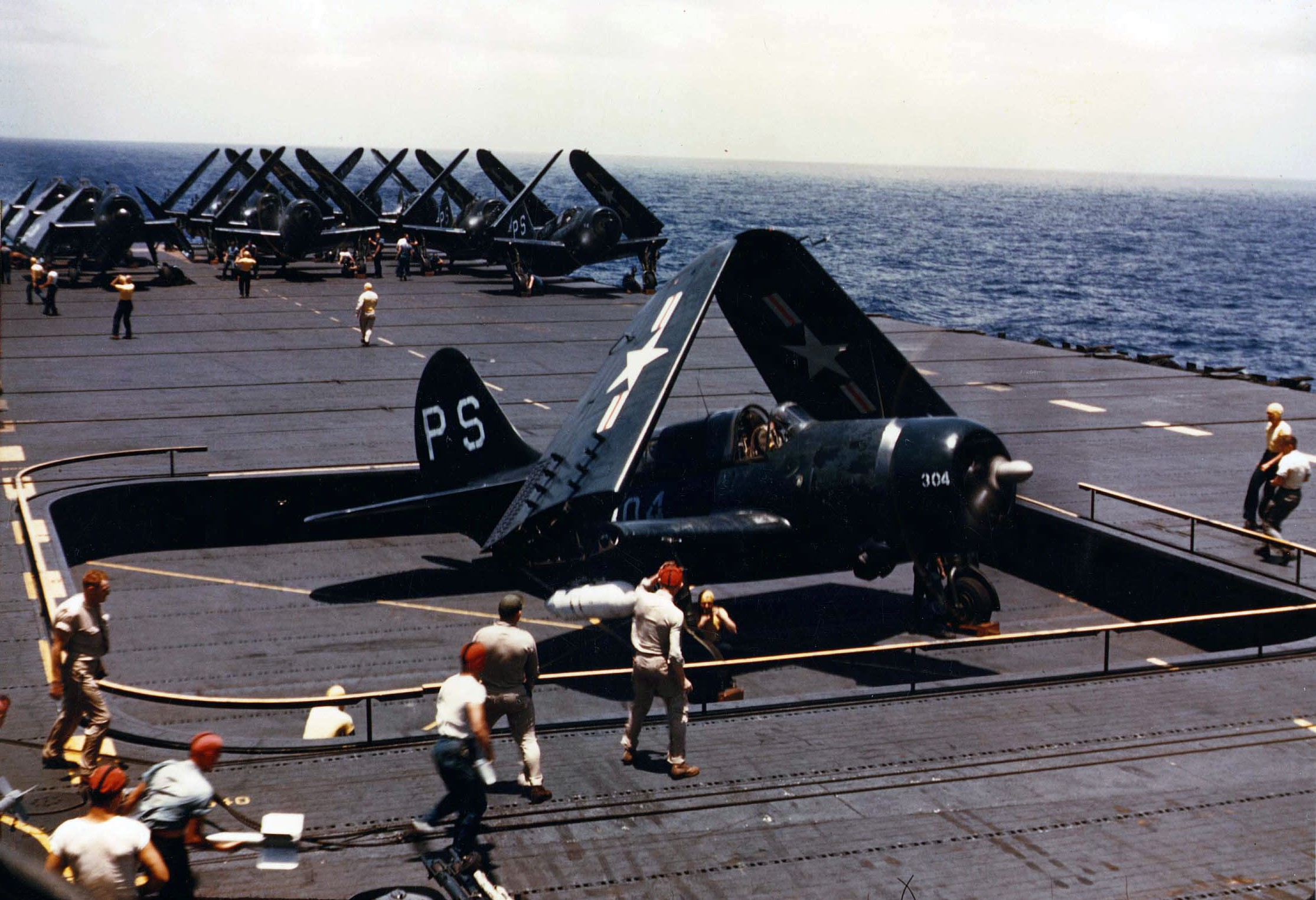
The "PS" tail code on this SB2C Helldiver indicates assignment to Carrier Air Group 9.

PS

Assigned to	Assigned on	Notes
USS Philippine Sea (CV-47)	7 November 1946, U.S. Navy Letter ACL 156-46	
CVG-9, Carrier Air Group 9	12 December 1946, U.S. Navy Letter ACL 165-46	Tail code changed to "D" in August 1948.

PZ

Assigned to	Assigned on	Notes
USS Point Cruz (CVE-119)	7 November 1946, U.S. Navy Letter ACL 156-46	Only in effect until December 1946.

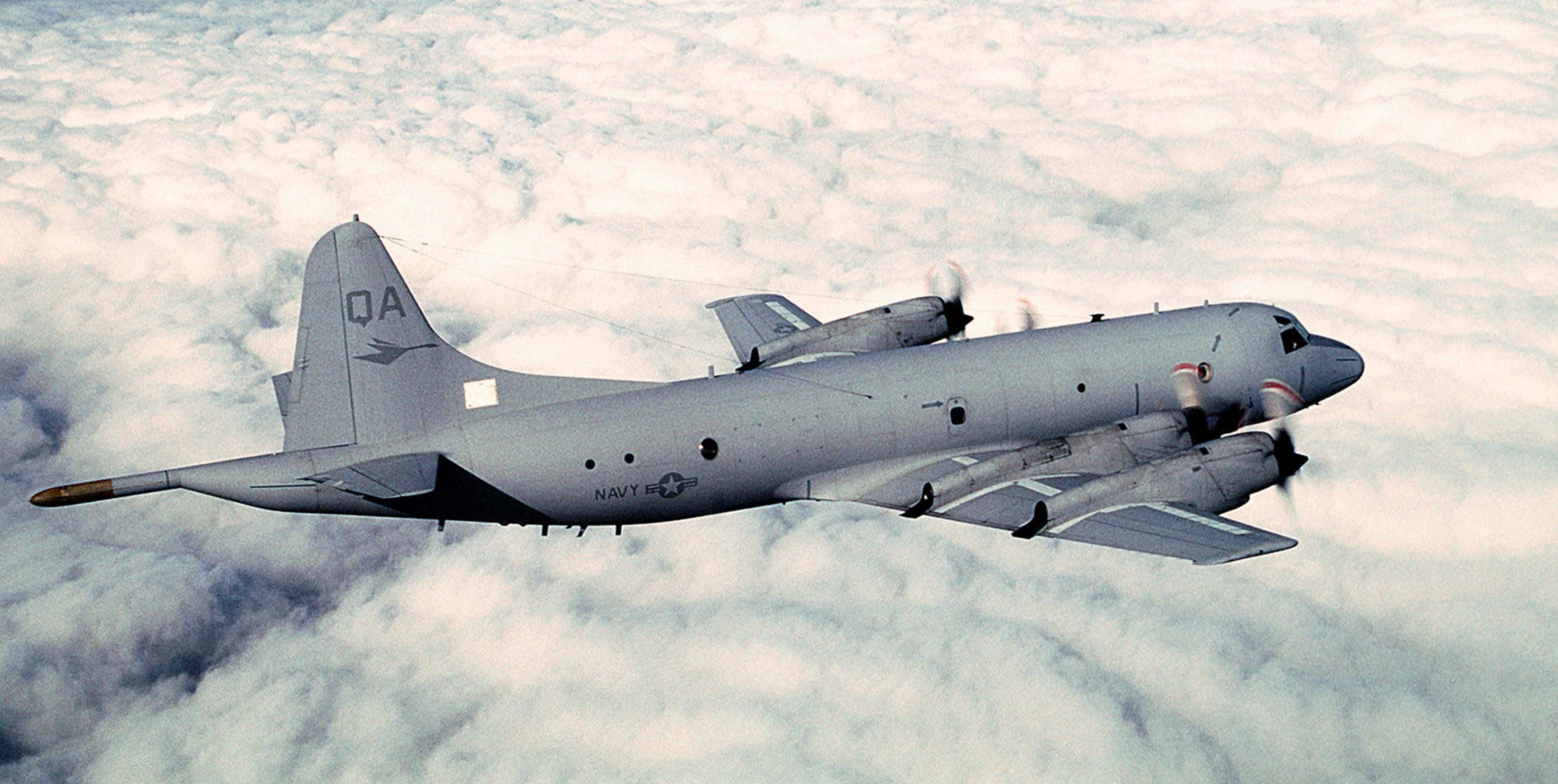
A P-3C Orion of VP-22 shows the squadron's "QA" tail code.

QA

Assigned to	Assigned on	Notes
VP-22	1957	Disestablished in March 1994.

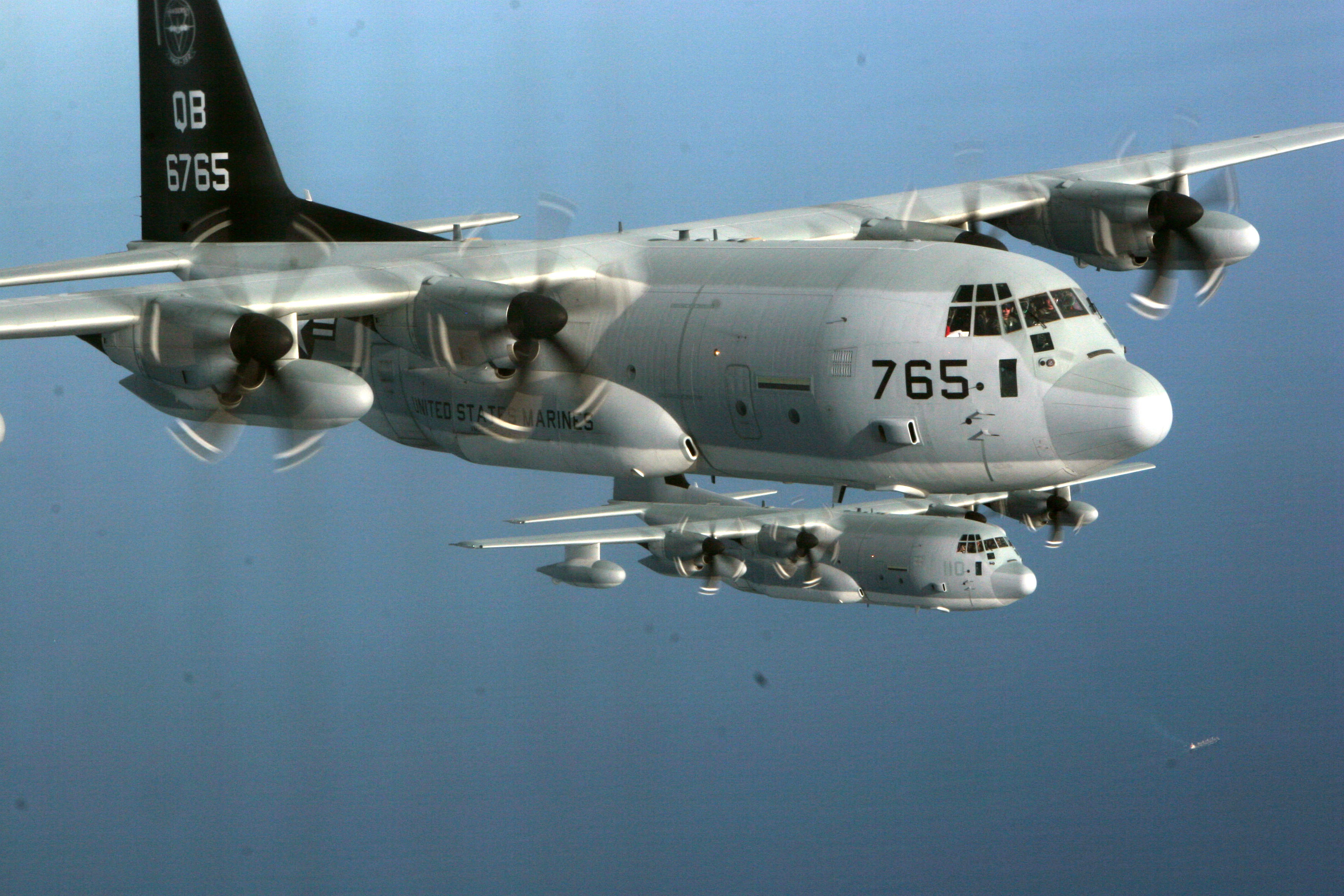
A pair of VMGR-352 KC-130J aircraft in flight.

QB

Assigned to	Assigned on	Notes
VMR-352 Re-designated VMGR-352	1957	

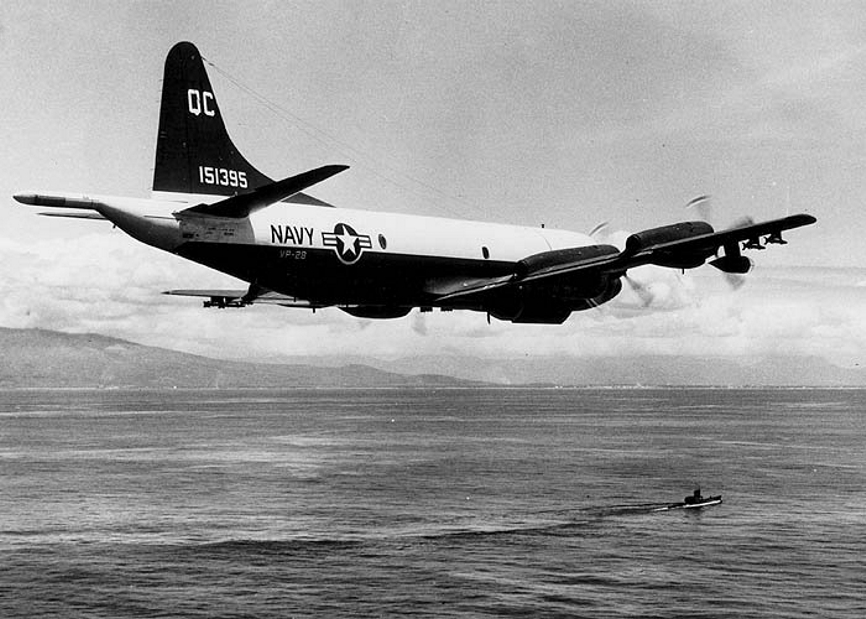
A P-3A Orion of VP-28.

QC

Assigned to	Assigned on	Notes
VP-28	1957	Disestablished in October 1969.

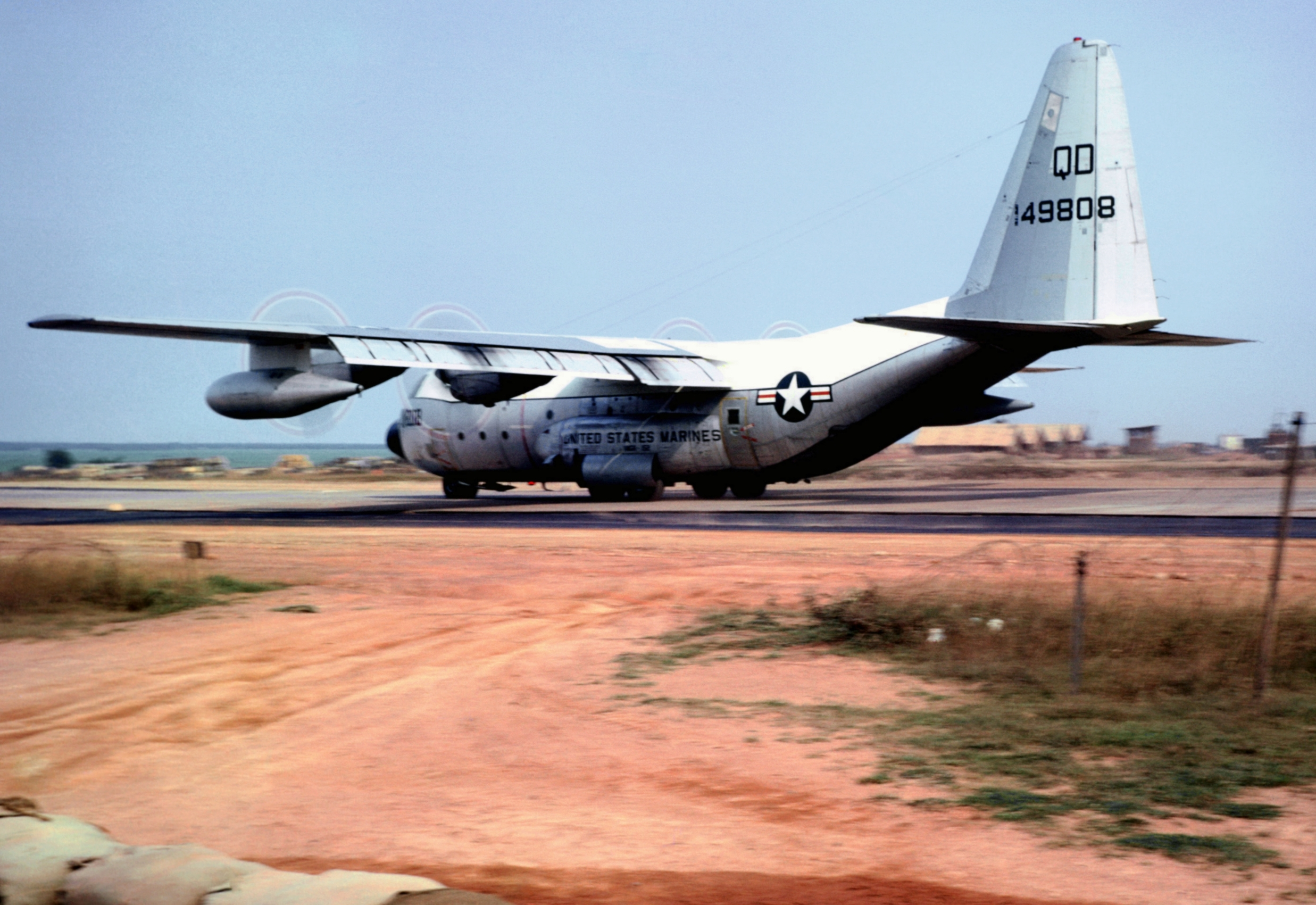
A VMGR KC-130F Hercules as seen in 1967.

QD

Assigned to	Assigned on	Notes
VMR-253 Re-designated VMGR-152	1957	

QE

Assigned to	Assigned on	Notes
VP-40	1957	

QF

Assigned to	Assigned on	Notes
MARS-37, Maintenance and Repair Squadron 37 Re-designated H&MS-37, Headquarters and Maintenance Squadron 37	1957	Disestablished.

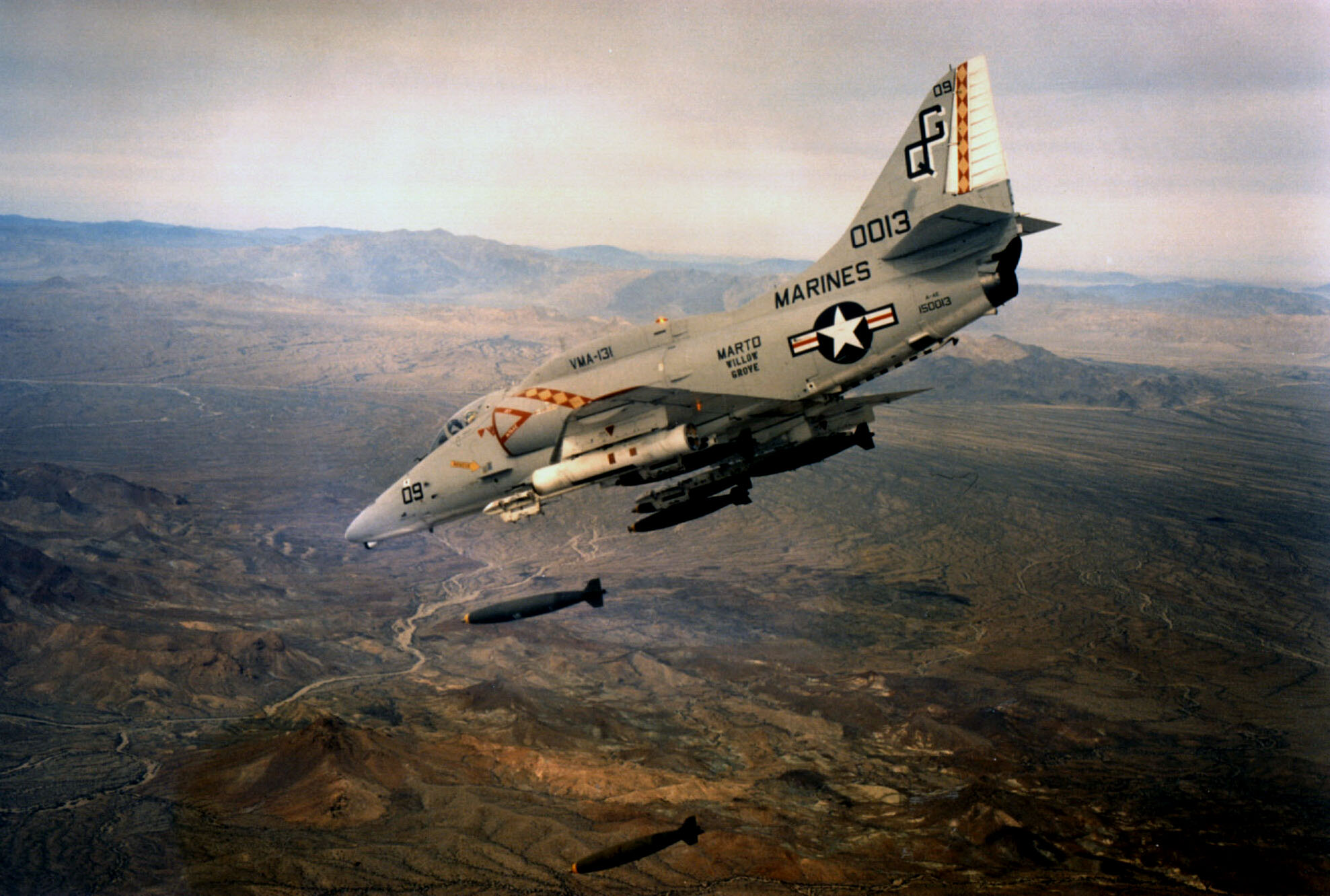
The squadron's "QG" tail code is clearly seen on this VMA-131 A-4E Skyhawk.

QG

Assigned to	Assigned on	Notes
VMA-131	January 1972	Disestablished in December 1998.

QH

Assigned to	Assigned on	Notes
VMGR-234	January 1972	

QJ

Assigned to	Assigned on	Notes
HMM-768	January 1972	Disestablished in 1976.

QK

Assigned to	Assigned on	Notes
HML-771	January 1972	

QL

Assigned to	Assigned on	Notes
HMH-776 Re-designated HML-776	1959	Disestablished in July 1994.

QM

Assigned to	Assigned on	Notes
HMM-777	January 1972	Disestablished in October 1976.

QN

Assigned to	Assigned on	Notes
VMO-8	January 1972	Disestablished in July 1976

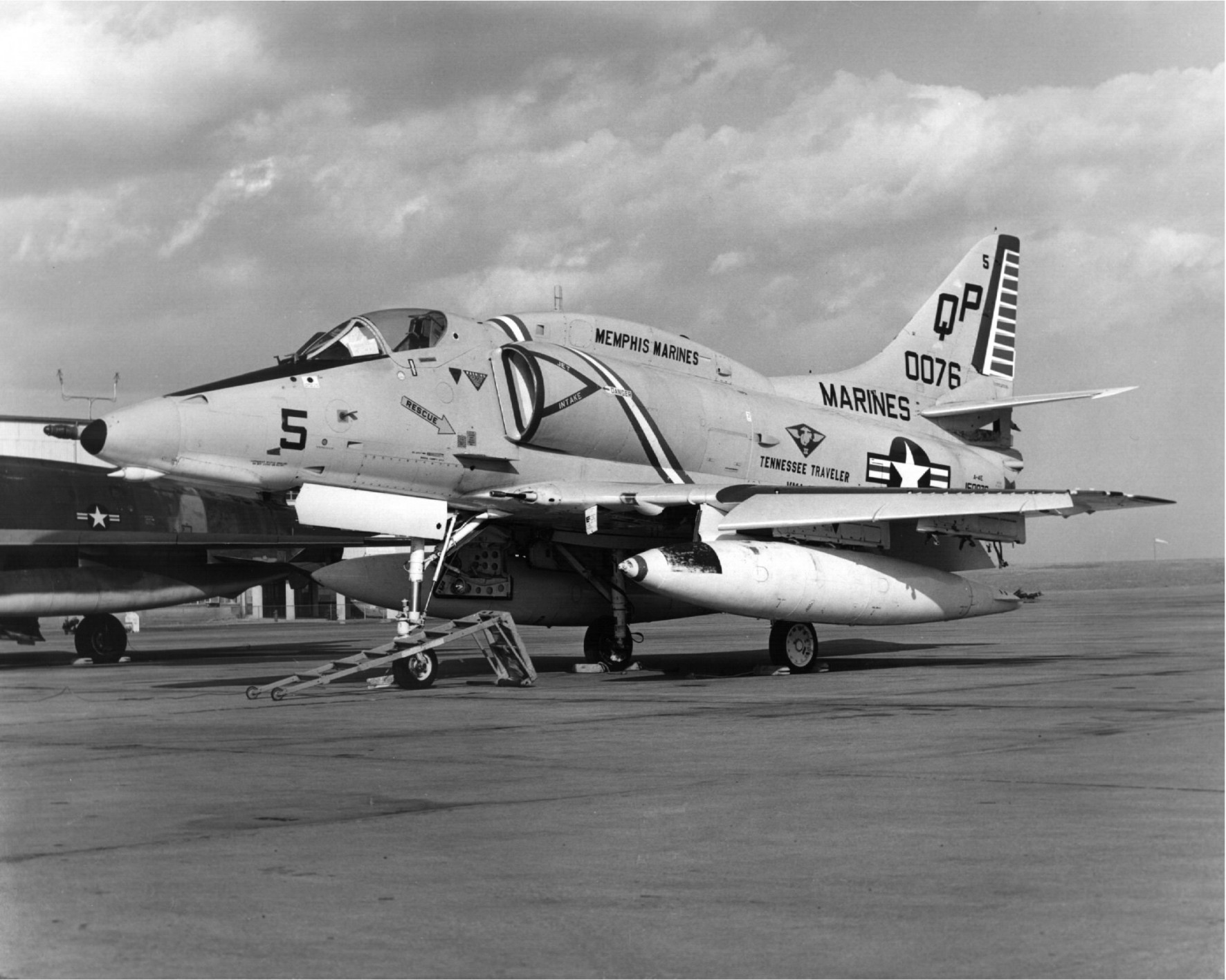
An A-4E Skyhawk of VMA-124.

QP

Assigned to	Assigned on	Notes
VMA-124	January 1972	Disestablished in 1996.

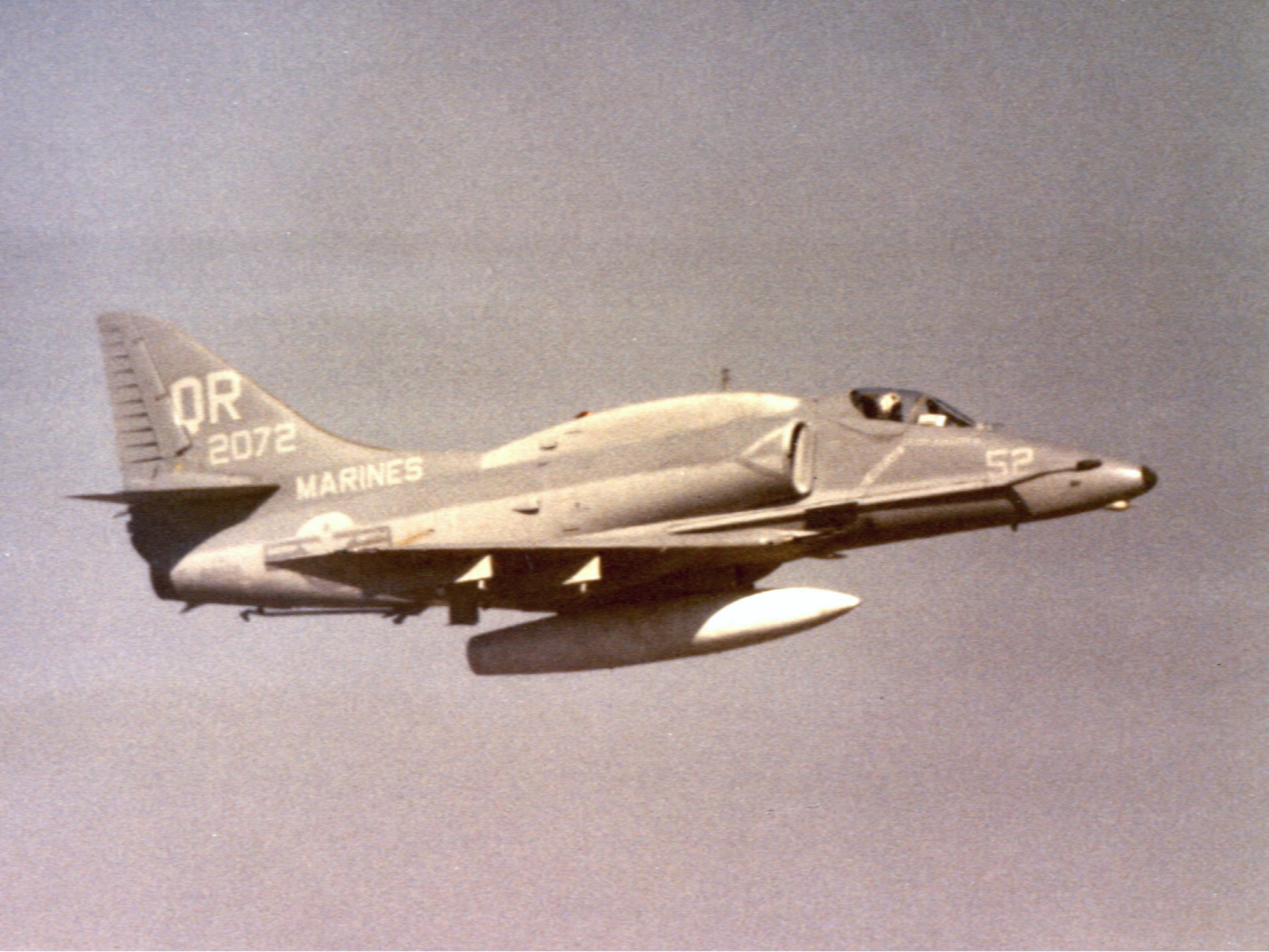
A subdued squadron's tail code is seen on this VMA-322 A-4E Skyhawk.

QR

Assigned to	Assigned on	Notes
VMA-322	January 1972	Disestablished in June 1992.

QS

Assigned to	Assigned on	Notes
HMM-776	January 1972	Disestablished in October 1976.

QT

Assigned to	Assigned on	Notes
HMLAT-303	April 1982	

QY

Assigned to	Assigned on	Notes
H&MS-46, Headquarters and Maintenance Squadron 46	January 1972	

QZ

Assigned to	Assigned on	Notes
H&MS-49, Headquarters and Maintenance Squadron 49	July 1971	

R

Assigned to	Assigned on	Notes
USS Cabot (CVL-28)	July 1945	
USS Randolph (CV-15)	8 January 1946, U.S. Navy Letter FF12-5	
CVG-17, Carrier Air Group 17	12 December 1946, U.S. Navy Letter ACL 165-46	Code changed to "AL" in 1957.
NAS New York	November 1946	Code changed to "7R" in 1956.

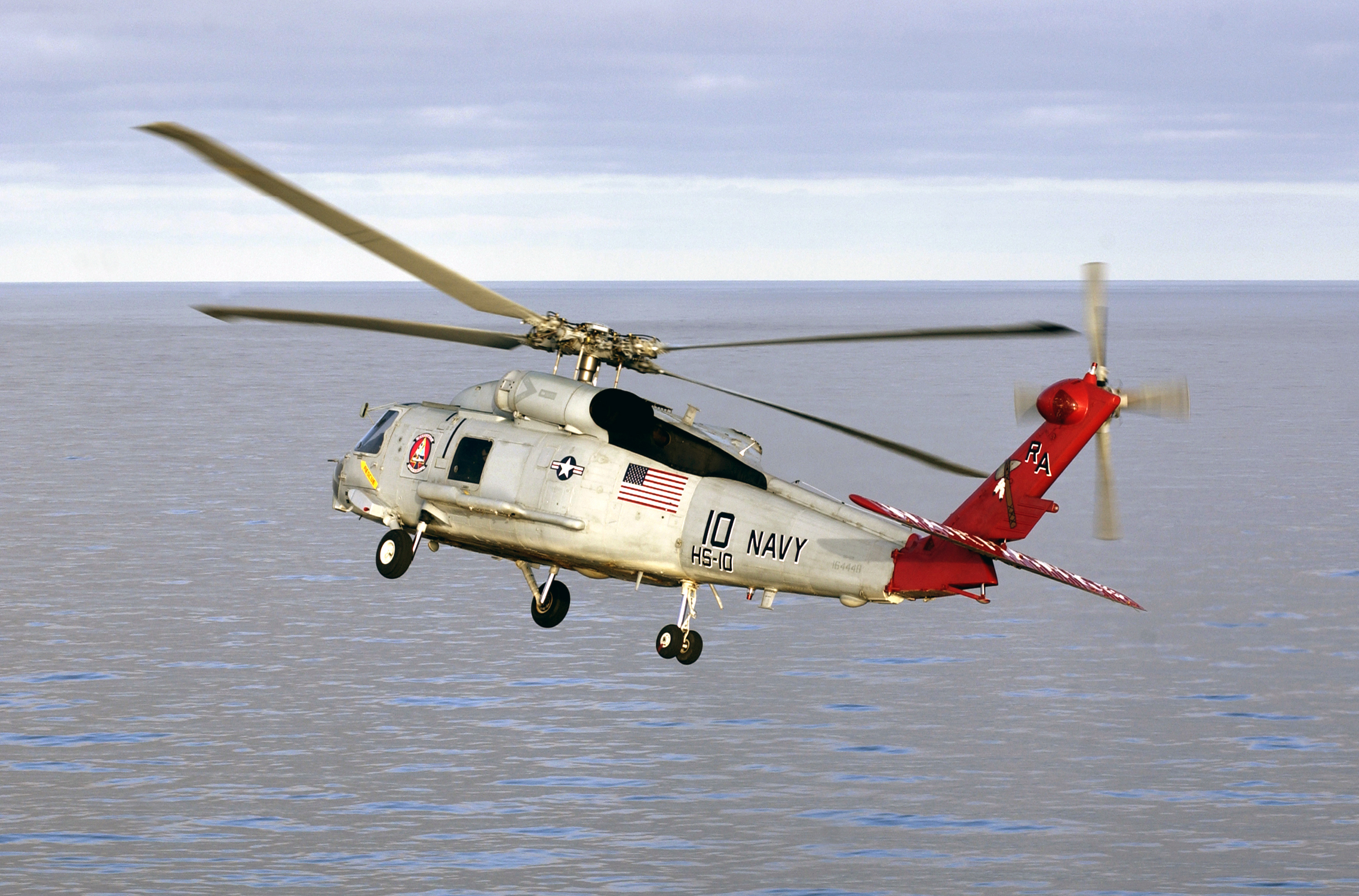
The "RA" tail code of HS-10 is seen on this SH-60F Seahawk.

RA

Assigned to	Assigned on	Notes
VRU-1	7 November 1946, U.S. Navy Letter ACL 156-46	
VR-2	4 August 1948, U.S. Navy Letter ACL 69-48	Disestablished in June 1958.
RCVG-51, Replacement Carrier Antisubmarine Warfare Air Group 51	1960	Disestablished in June 1970. RCVG-51 tail code retained by VS-41 and HS-10.
VS-41	June 1970	Disestablished in 2006.
HS-10	June 1970	Deactivated on 12 July 2012

RB

Assigned to	Assigned on	Notes
VRU-2 Re-designated VR-22	7 November 1946, U.S. Navy Letter ACL 156-46	
VP-42	1957	Disestablished in September 1969.
HC-5 Re-designated HSC-25	1984	

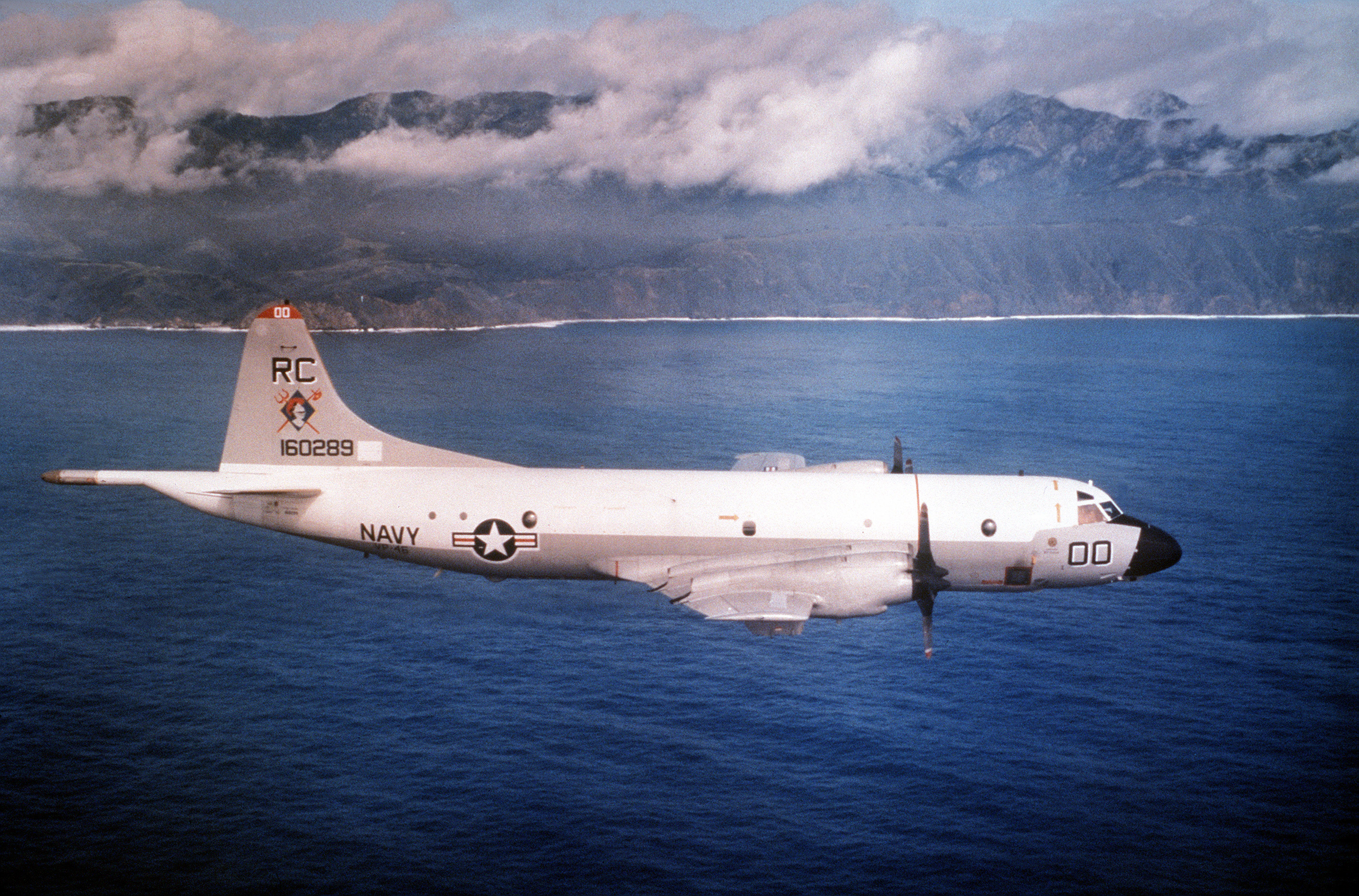
A P-3C Orion of VP-46.

RC

Assigned to	Assigned on	Notes
VRU-3 Re-designated VR-23	7 November 1946, U.S. Navy Letter ACL 156-46	
VP-46	1957	

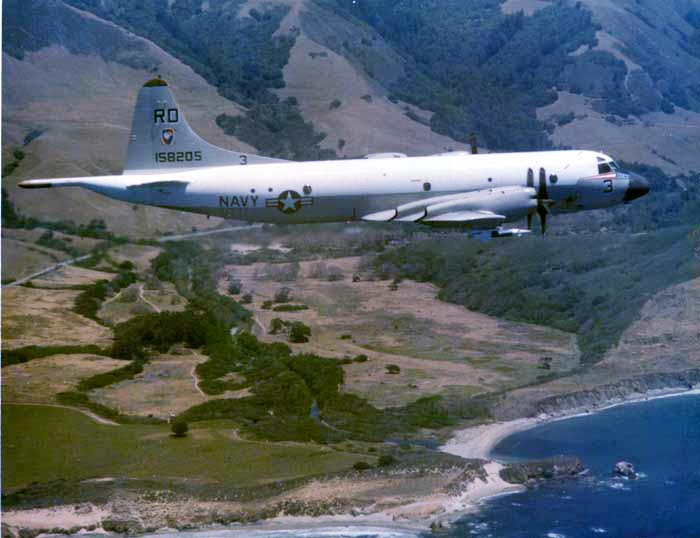
A P-3C Orion of VP-47.

RD

Assigned to	Assigned on	Notes
VRU-4 Re-designated VR-24	7 November 1946, U.S. Navy Letter ACL 156-46	
VP-47	1957	

RE

Assigned to	Assigned on	Notes
USS Rendova (CVE-114)	7 November 1946, U.S. Navy Letter ACL 156-46	
VMF-214	12 December 1946, U.S. Navy Letter ACL 165-46	
VR-31	4 August 1948, U.S. Navy Letter ACL 69-48	

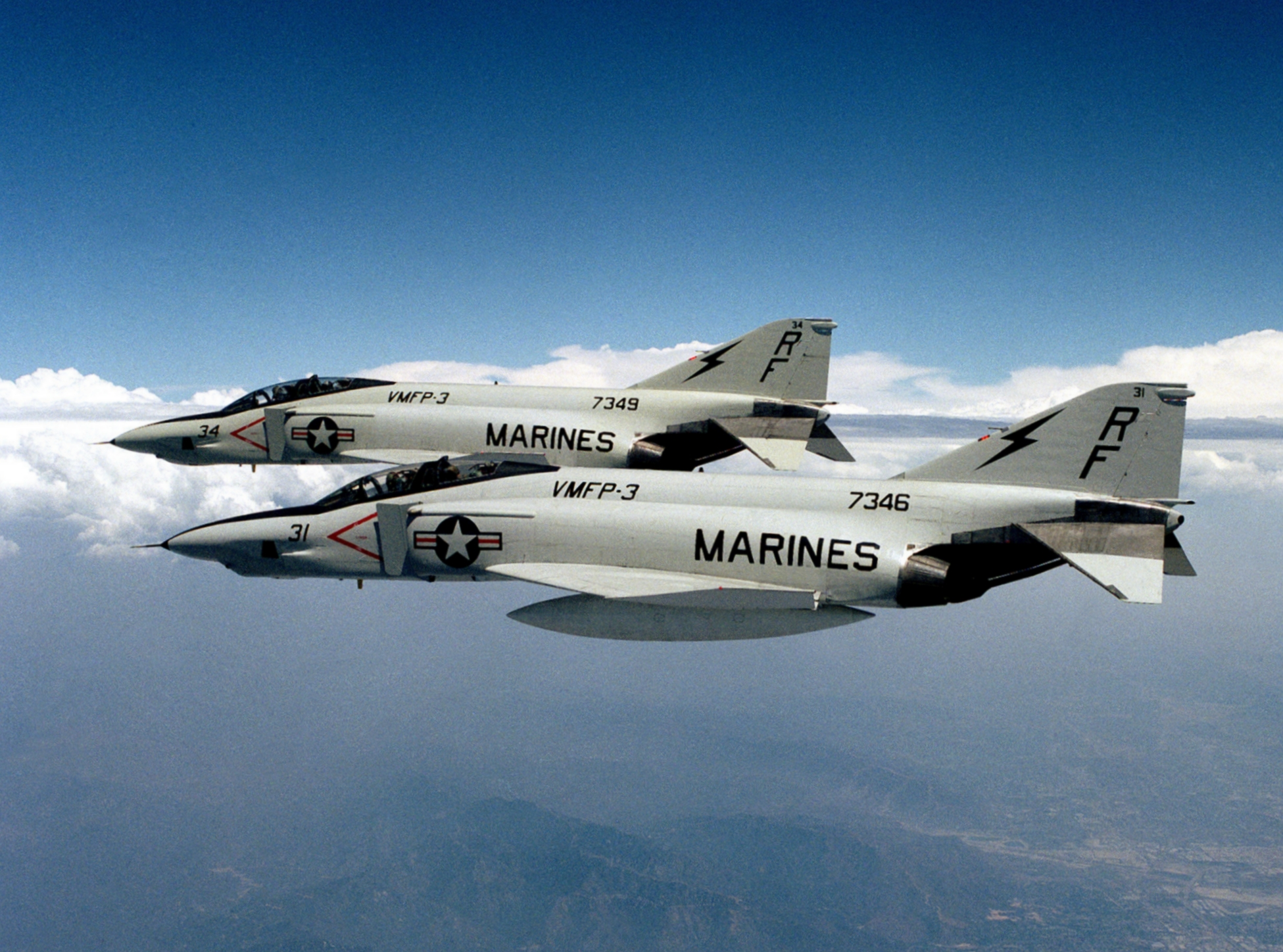
A pair of VMFP-3 RF-4B Phantoms show off their "RF" tail codes.

RF

Assigned to	Assigned on	Notes
Fighter units of Navy Air Reserve at NAS New York	November 1946	A very short-lived assignment.
VR-32	4 August 1948, U.S. Navy Letter ACL 69-48	
VMFP-3	July 1975	Disestablished in September 1990.

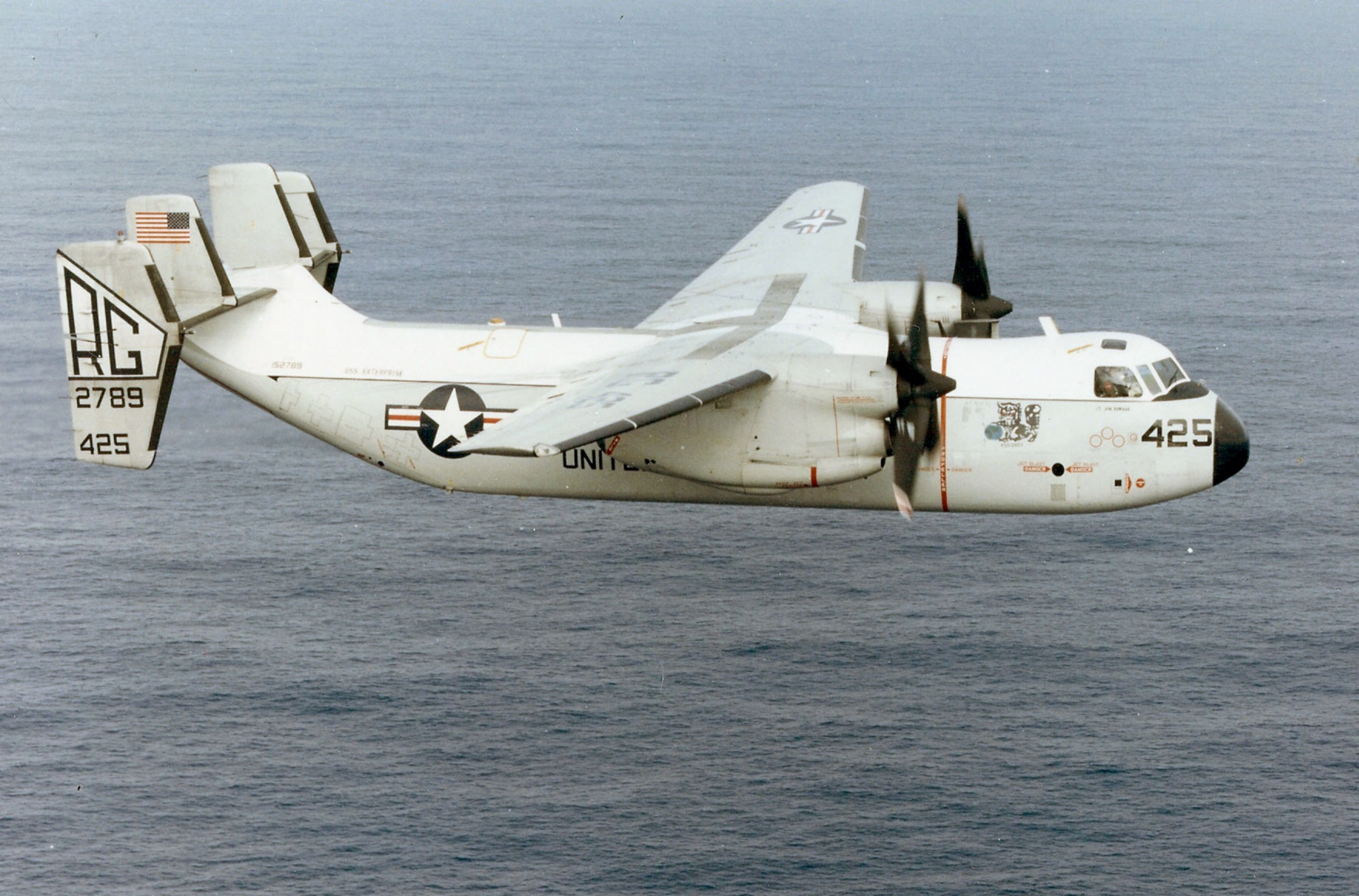
A C-2A Greyhound of VRC-50.

RG

Assigned to	Assigned on	Notes
VRC-50	October 1966	Disestablished in October 1994.
VR-51	1 June 1997	

RH

Assigned to	Assigned on	Notes
VR-8	4 August 1948, U.S. Navy Letter ACL 69-48	Disestablished in 1957.

RI

Assigned to	Assigned on	Notes
USS Oriskany (CV-34)	7 November 1946, U.S. Navy Letter ACL 156-46	
CVG-21, Carrier Air Group 21	12 December 1946, U.S. Navy Letter ACL 165-46	Tail code changed to "G" in 1955.

RL

Assigned to	Assigned on	Notes
VXS-1, Scientific Development Squadron 1	December 2004	

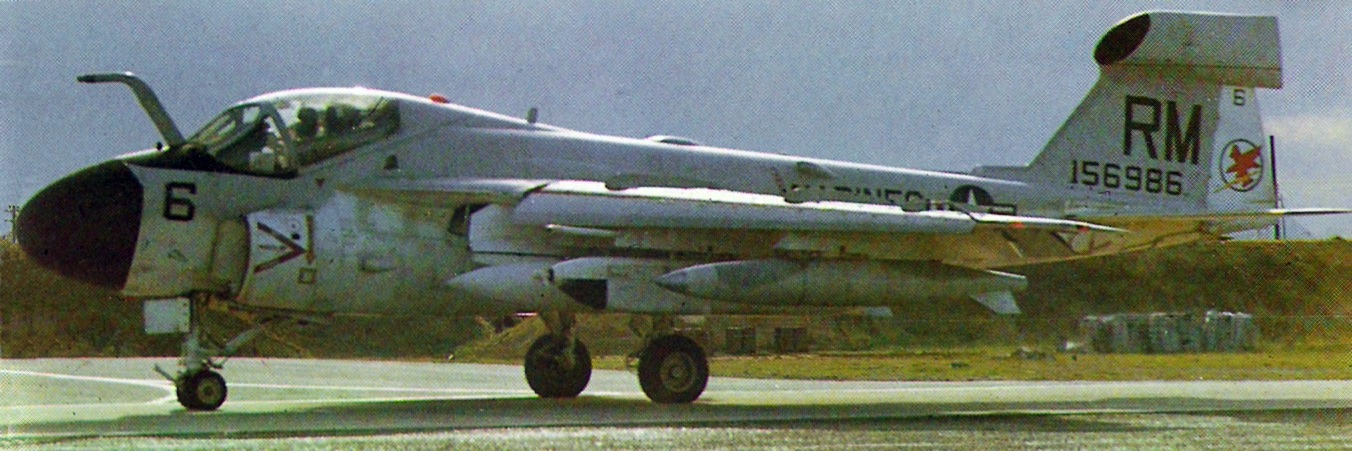
An EA-6A Intruder assigned to VMCJ-1.

RM

Assigned to	Assigned on	Notes
VR-44	4 August 1948, U.S. Navy Letter ACL 69-48	
VMC-1 Subsequently, re-designated VMCJ-1 and later VMAQ-4		

RN

Assigned to	Assigned on	Notes
VR-7	1957	

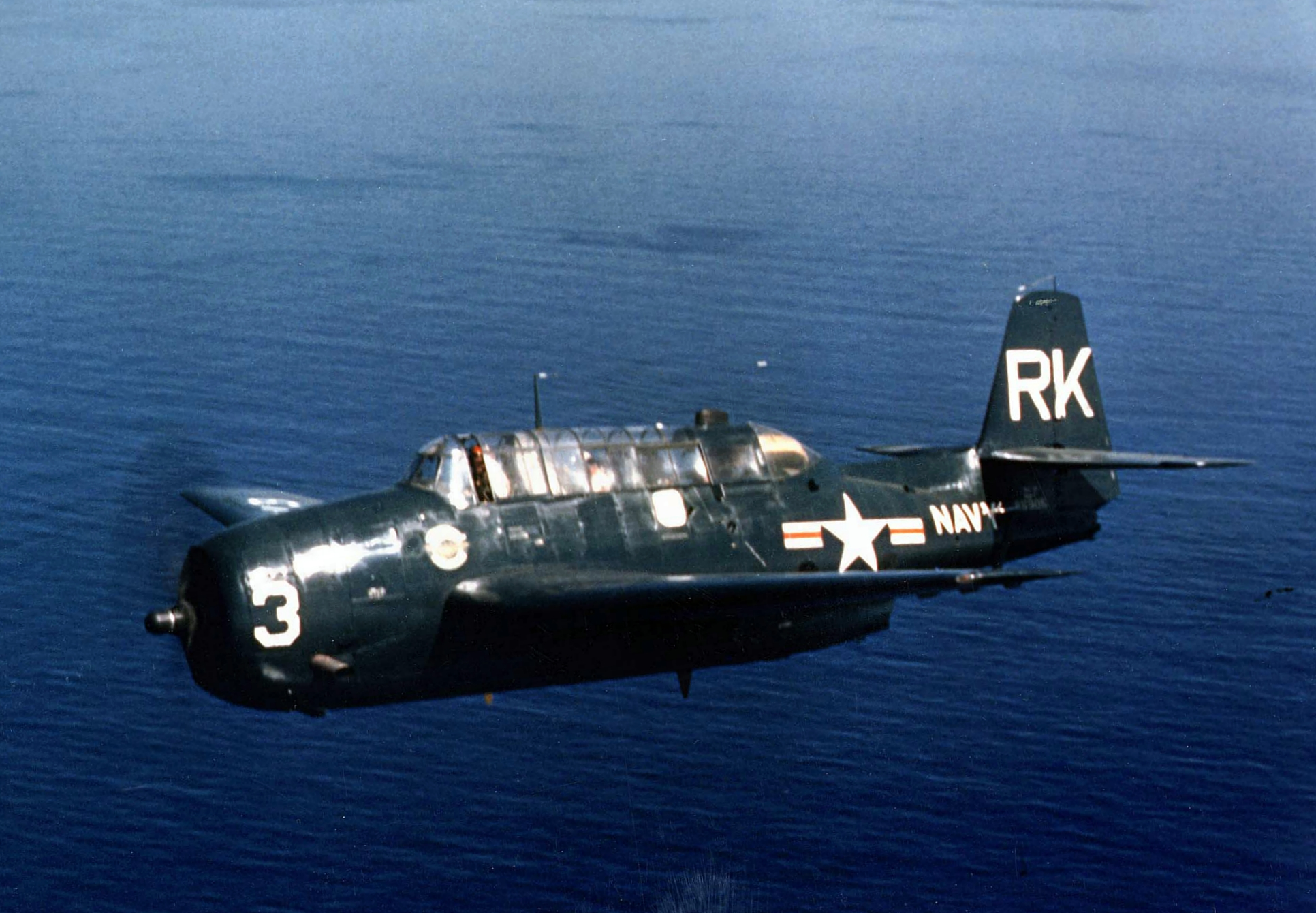
The squadron's tail code is seen clearly on this VR-23 TBM-3R Avenger COD aircraft.

RK

Assigned to	Assigned on	Notes
VR-23	August 1951	Disestablished in 1957.

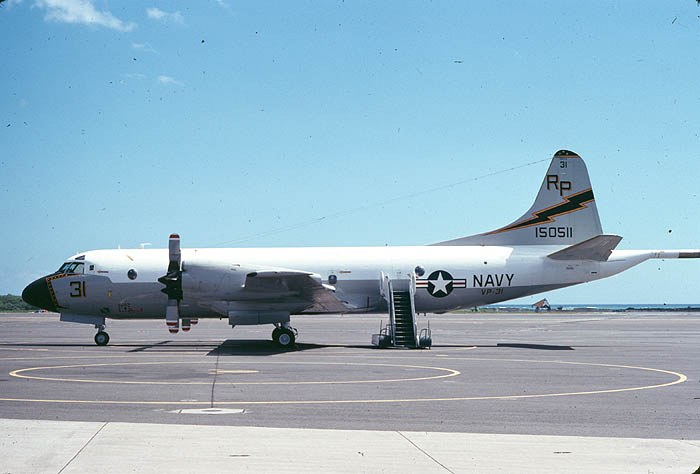
A P-3A Orion of VP-31.

RP

Assigned to	Assigned on	Notes
VR-1	4 August 1948, U.S. Navy Letter ACL 69-48	
VP-31	June 1960	Disestablished in October 1993.

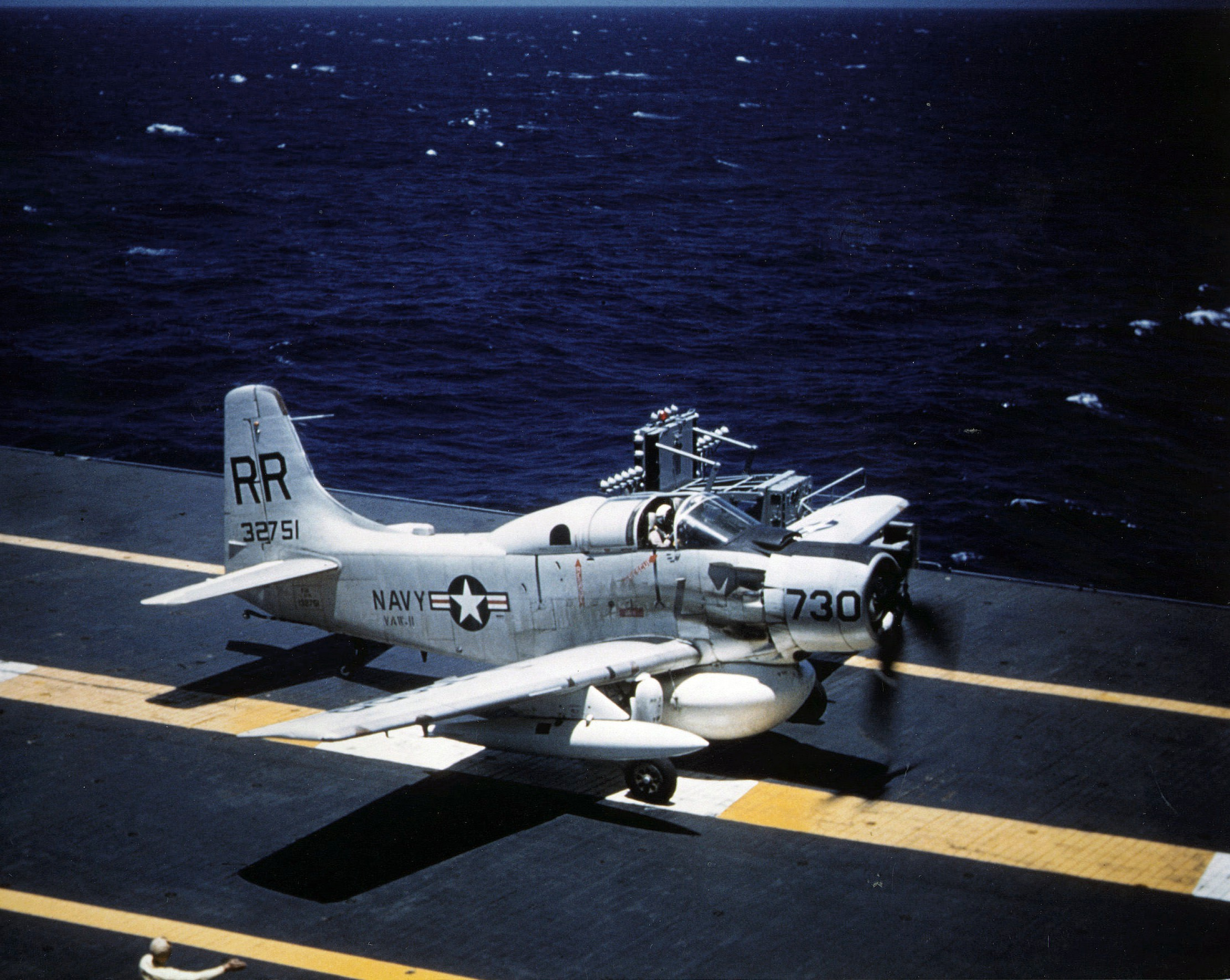
The "RR" tail code on this AD-5W Skyraider indicates assignment to VAW-11.

RR

Assigned to	Assigned on	Notes
USS Yorktown (CV-10)	July 1945	
USS Belleau Wood (CVL-24)	8 January 1946, U.S. Navy Letter FF12-5	
VAW-11 Re-designated VAW-111	1957	Disestablished in 1976. Re-established in October 1986, disestablished in April 1988.

RS

Assigned to	Assigned on	Notes
VR-5	4 August 1948, U.S. Navy Letter ACL 69-48	Disestablished in June 1957.
VR-61	October 1982	

RT

Assigned to	Assigned on	Notes
Training units of Navy Air Reserve at NAS New York	November 1946	A very short-lived assignment.
VR-3	4 August 1948, U.S. Navy Letter ACL 69-48	Disestablished in 1957.
VR-53	July 1972	Code changed to "WV" in 1999.

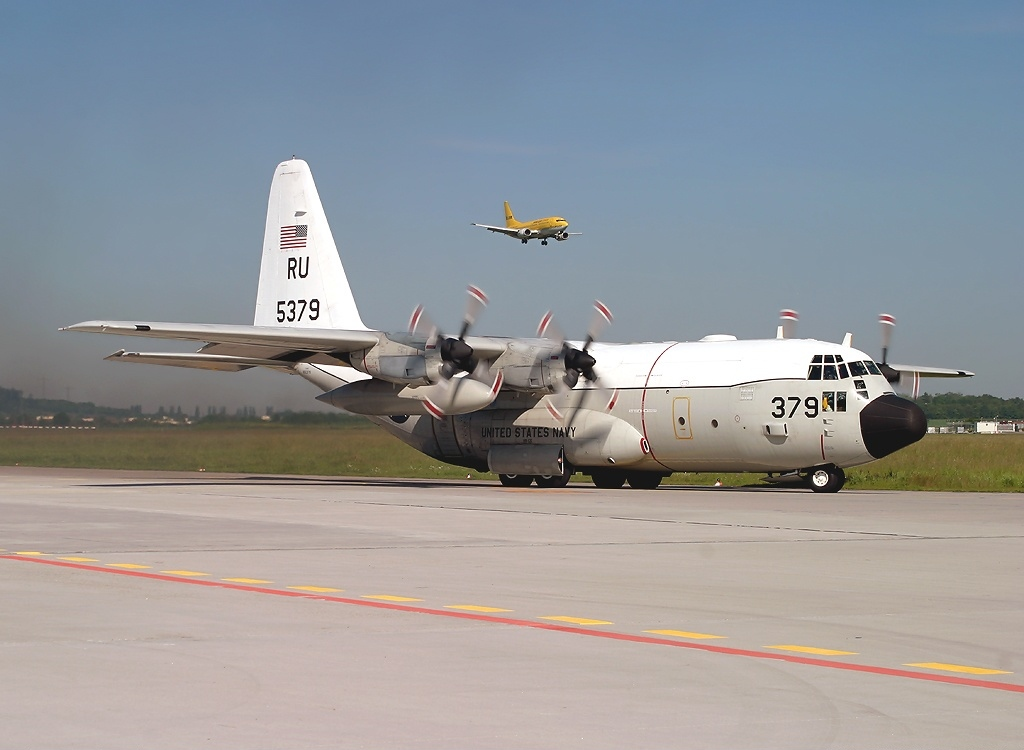
"RU" lettering on this C-130T Hercules indicates assignment to VR-55.

RU

Assigned to	Assigned on	Notes
VR-6	4 August 1948, U.S. Navy Letter ACL 69-48	Disestablished in 1957.
VR-55	April 1976	

RV

Assigned to	Assigned on	Notes
VR-51	1985	Disestablished on 30 September 1994

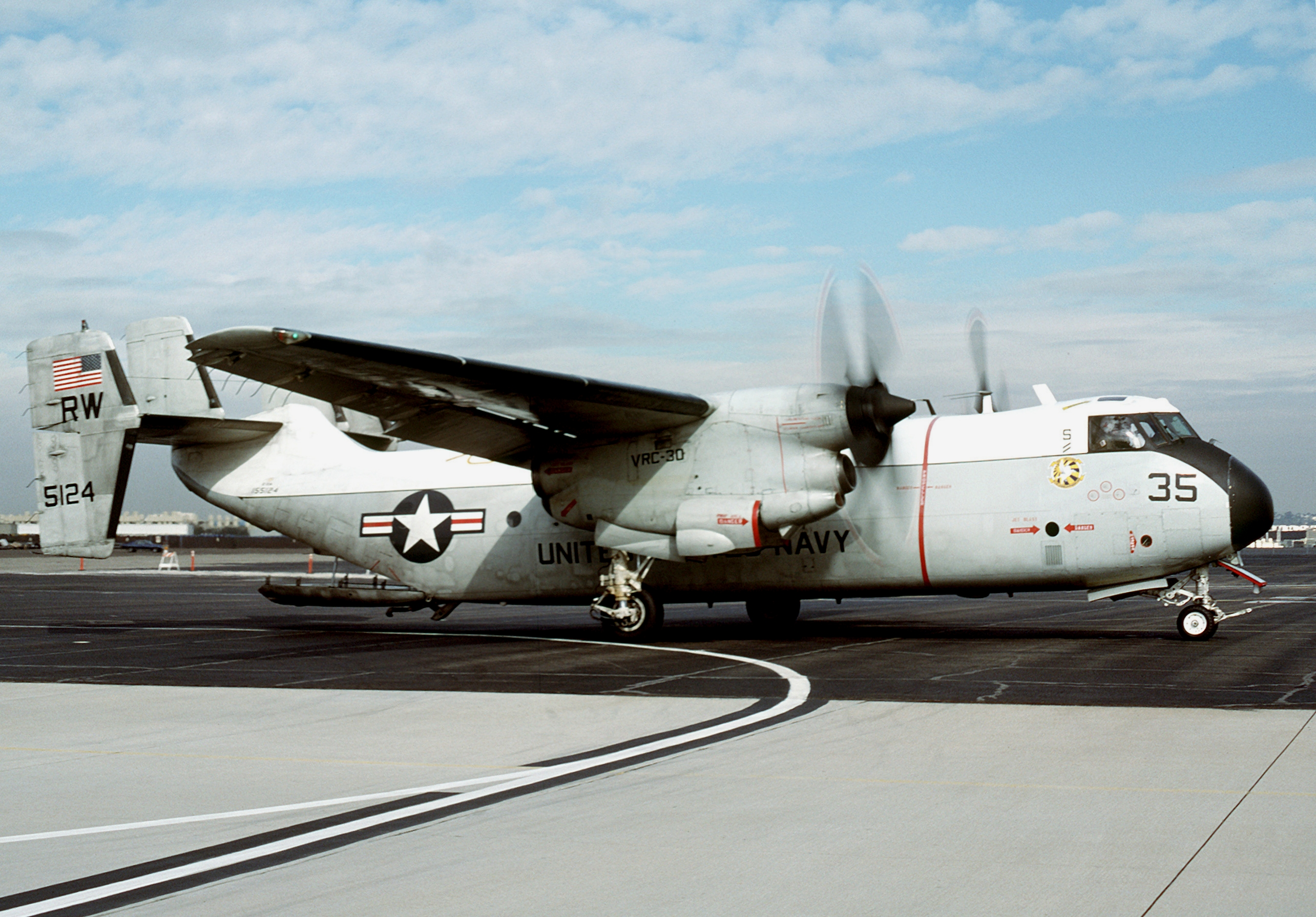
A C-2A Greyhound of VRC-30.

RW

Assigned to	Assigned on	Notes
VR-30 Re-designated VRC-30	1960s	

RX

Assigned to	Assigned on	Notes
VR-57	November 1977	

RY

Assigned to	Assigned on	Notes
VR-51	November 1970	Code changed to "RV" in 1985.
VR-59	1985	

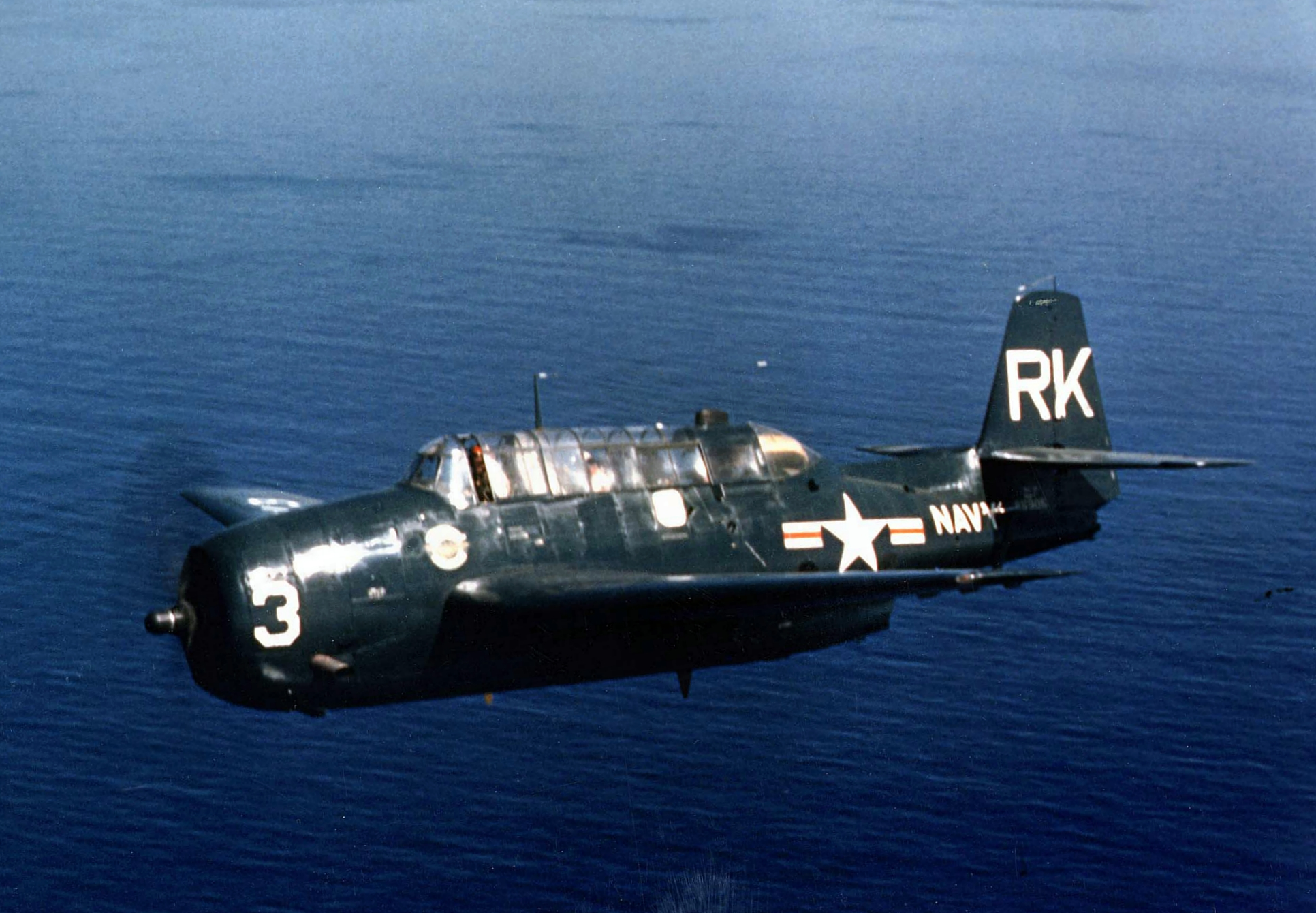
The "RZ" code on the starboard wing of this TBM-3R Avenger indicates assignment to VR-21.

RZ

Assigned to	Assigned on	Notes
VR-21	4 August 1948, U.S. Navy Letter ACL 69-48	Disestablished in March 1977.

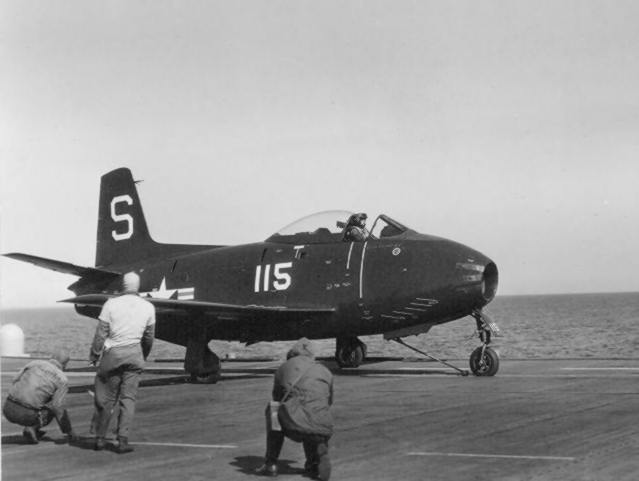
The "S" on the tail of this FJ-1 Fury indicates assignment to Carrier Air Group 5.

S

Assigned to	Assigned on	Notes
USS Hornet (CV-12)	July 1945	
USS Franklin (CV-13)	8 January 1946, U.S. Navy Letter FF12-5	This assignment was obviously a purely bureaucratic one as USS Franklin was never put back into service after heavy damage received on 19 March 1945.
NAS Norfolk	November 1946	Code changed to "6S" in 1956.
CVG-5, Carrier Air Group 5	12 December 1946, U.S. Navy Letter ACL 165-46	Tail code changed to "NF" in 1956.

SA

Assigned to	Assigned on	Notes
USS Saipan (CVL-48)	7 November 1946, U.S. Navy Letter ACL 156-46	
VP-MS-2 Re-designated VP-42	7 November 1946, U.S. Navy Letter ACL 156-46	Tail code changed to "RB" in 1957.
CVLG-1, Carrier Air Group Light 1	12 December 1946, U.S. Navy Letter ACL 165-46	A very short-lived assignment.
VMFT-10	1956	Disestablished in July 1958.
HC-3 Re-designated HSC-3	1967	

SB

Assigned to	Assigned on	Notes
USS Salerno Bay (CVE-110)	7 November 1946, U.S. Navy Letter ACL 156-46	
VP-ML-2 Re-designated VP-2	7 November 1946, U.S. Navy Letter ACL 156-46	Tail code changed to "YB" in 1957.
BTU-3, Basic Training Unit 3	1950	
VMAT-10	December 1951	
VMFAT-101	January 1969	Tail code changed to "SH" in the 1970s.

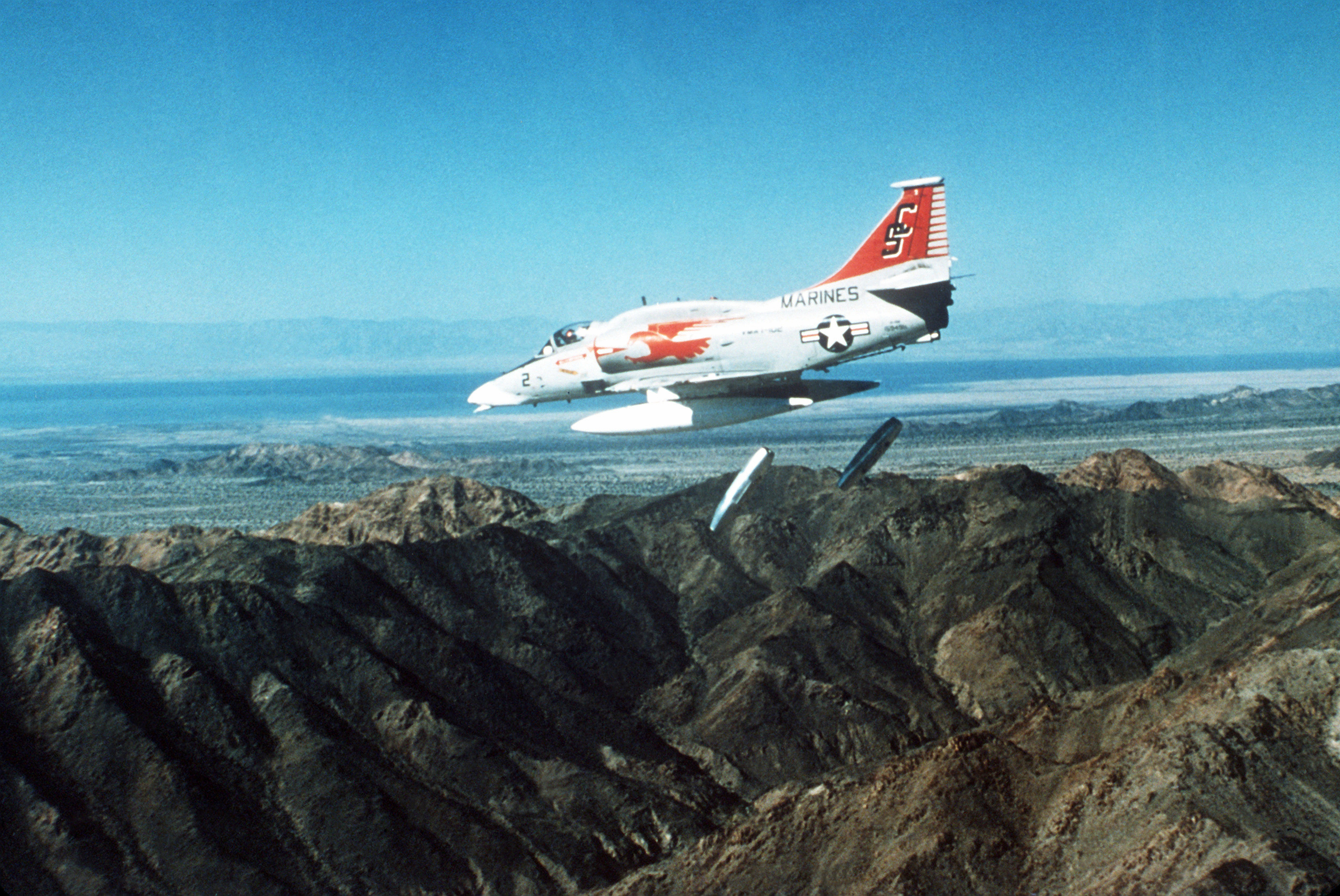
An A-4M Skyhawk of VMAT-102.

SC

Assigned to	Assigned on	Notes
VP-ML-4 Re-designated VP-4	7 November 1946, U.S. Navy Letter ACL 156-46	Tail code changed to "YD" in 1957.
VMFT(AW)-10	1957	Disestablished in July 1958.
VMAT-102	January 1969	Disestablished in October 1987.

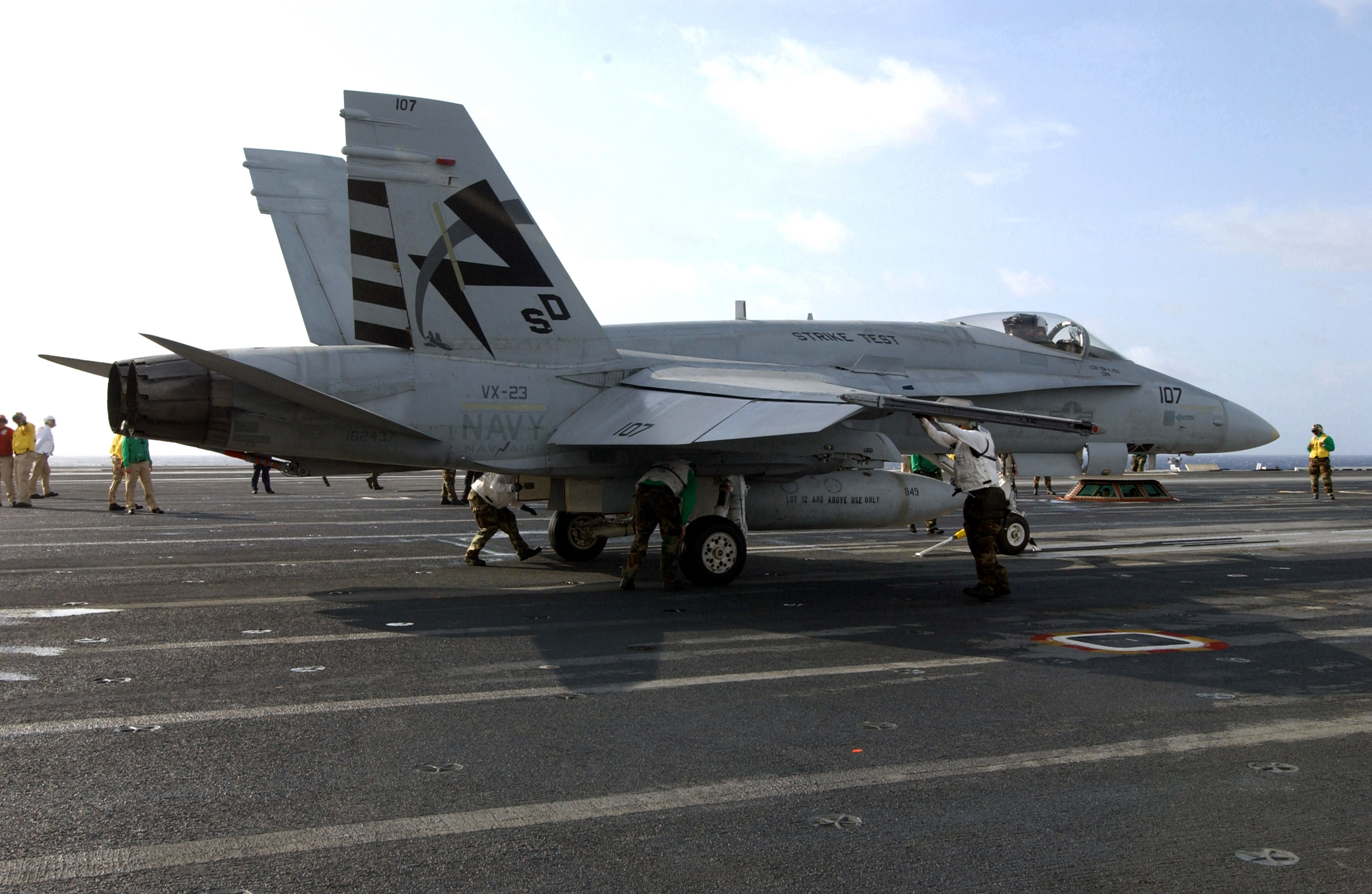
The "SD" code on the vertical stabilizer of this F/A-18 Hornet indicates assignment to VX-23.

SD

Assigned to	Assigned on	Notes
VPP-1 Re-designated VP-61	7 November 1946, U.S. Navy Letter ACL 156-46	Disestablished in January 1950.
VS-831 Re-designated VS-36	June 1951	
VMIT-10 Re-designated VMT-2	December 1951	
VMT-103	Circa 1970	Disestablished in May 1972.
VX-23	July 1995	

SE

Assigned to	Assigned on	Notes
H&MS-10, Headquarters and Maintenance Squadron 10	1957	Disestablished in 1958.
VP-50	July 1950	Tail code changed to "SG" in 1957.
HMLA-469	June 2009	

SF

Assigned to	Assigned on	Notes
VP-731 Re-designated VP-48	September 1950	Disestablished in May 1991.

SG

Assigned to	Assigned on	Notes
VP-50	1957	Disestablished in June 1992.

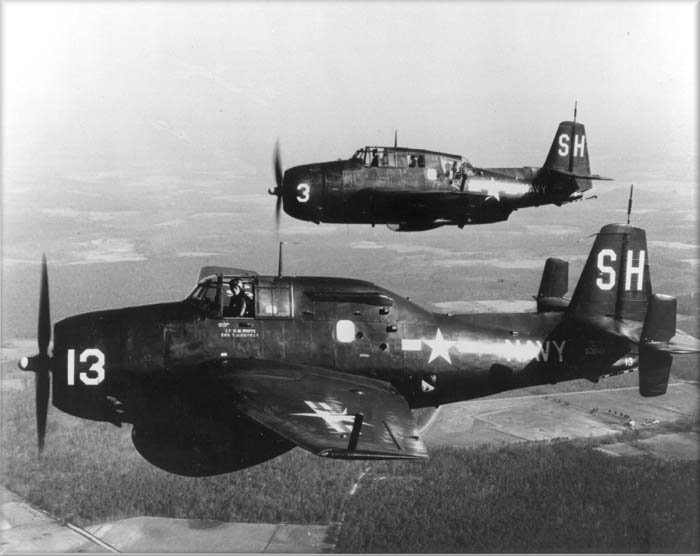
A pair of Avengers assigned to VS-26.

SH

Assigned to	Assigned on	Notes
VS-26	July 1953	Disestablished in May 1956.
AIRBARSRON-2, Air Barrier Squadron 2	1957	
VMFAT-101	Circa 1970	

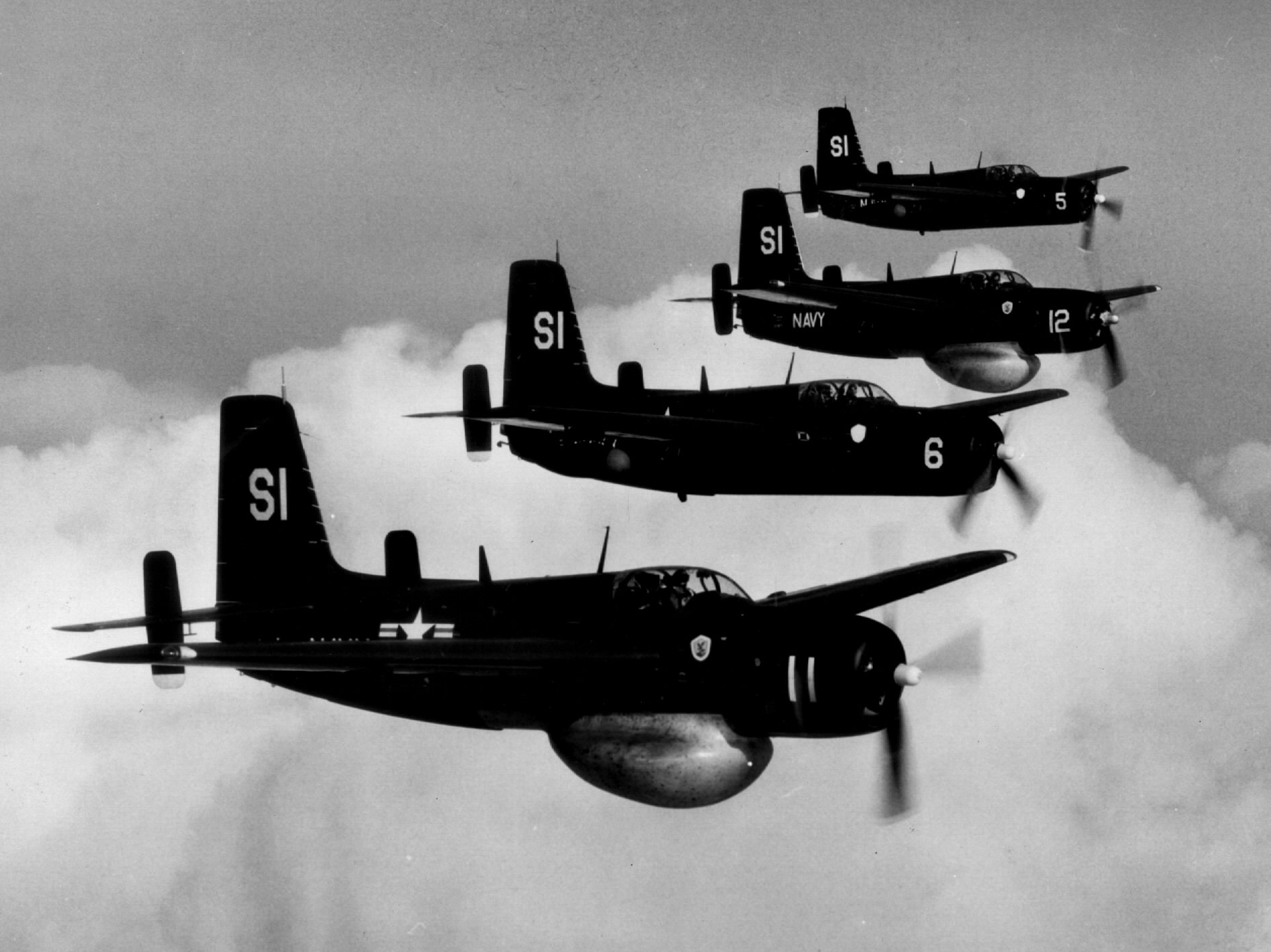
The tail code of VS-24 is clearly seen on these Grumman Guardians.

SI

Assigned to	Assigned on	Notes
USS Siboney (CVE-112)	7 November 1946, U.S. Navy Letter ACL 156-46	
VS-24	29 July 1950, U.S. Navy Letter ACL 43-50	Disestablished in June 1956.

SJ

Assigned to	Assigned on	Notes
VW-12	1957	Disestablished in February 1960.

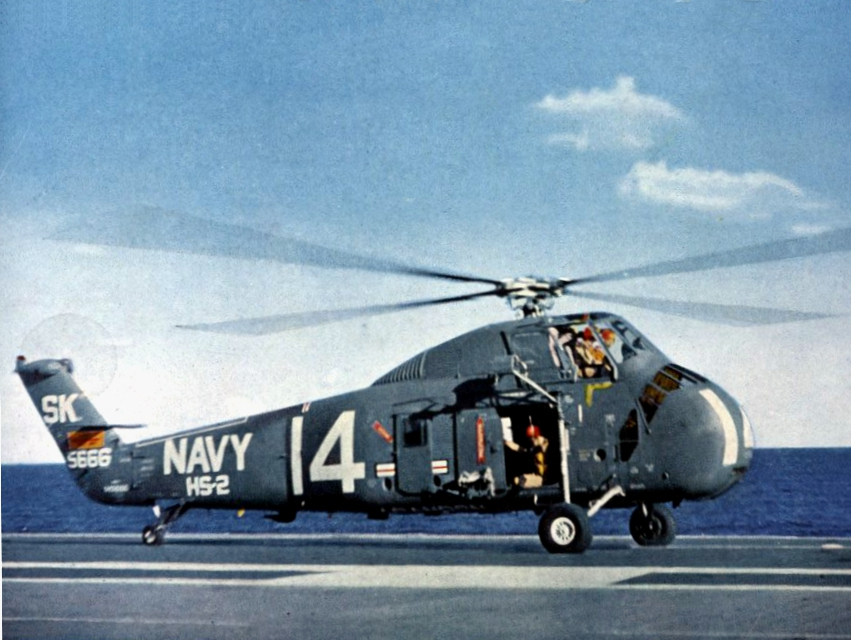
The "SK" on the tail boom of this HSS-1 Seabat indicates assignment to HS-2.

SK

Assigned to	Assigned on	Notes
VS-25	29 July 1950, U.S. Navy Letter ACL 43-50	Disestablished in June 1956.
HS-2 Re-designated HSC-2	1957	

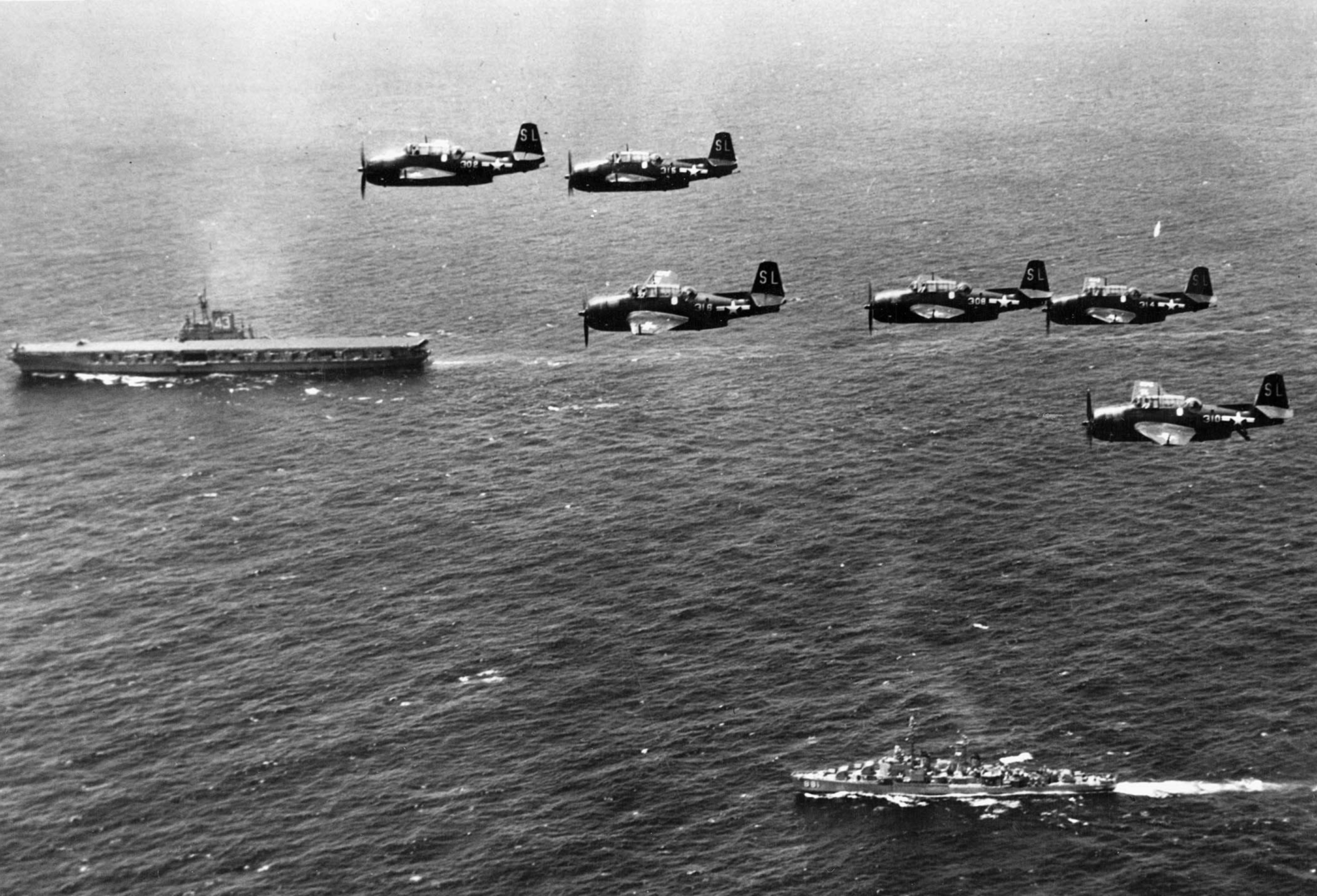
A group of TBM-3E Avenger anti-submarine aircraft of Composite Squadron VC-22.

SL

Assigned to	Assigned on	Notes
USS Sicily (CVE-118)	7 November 1946, U.S. Navy Letter ACL 156-46	
CVEG-2, Carrier Air Group Escort 2	12 December 1946, U.S. Navy Letter ACL 165-46	A very short-lived assignment.
VC-22 Re-designated VS-22	September 1948	Disestablished in June 1956.
VAH-21	September 1968	Disestablished in June 1969.

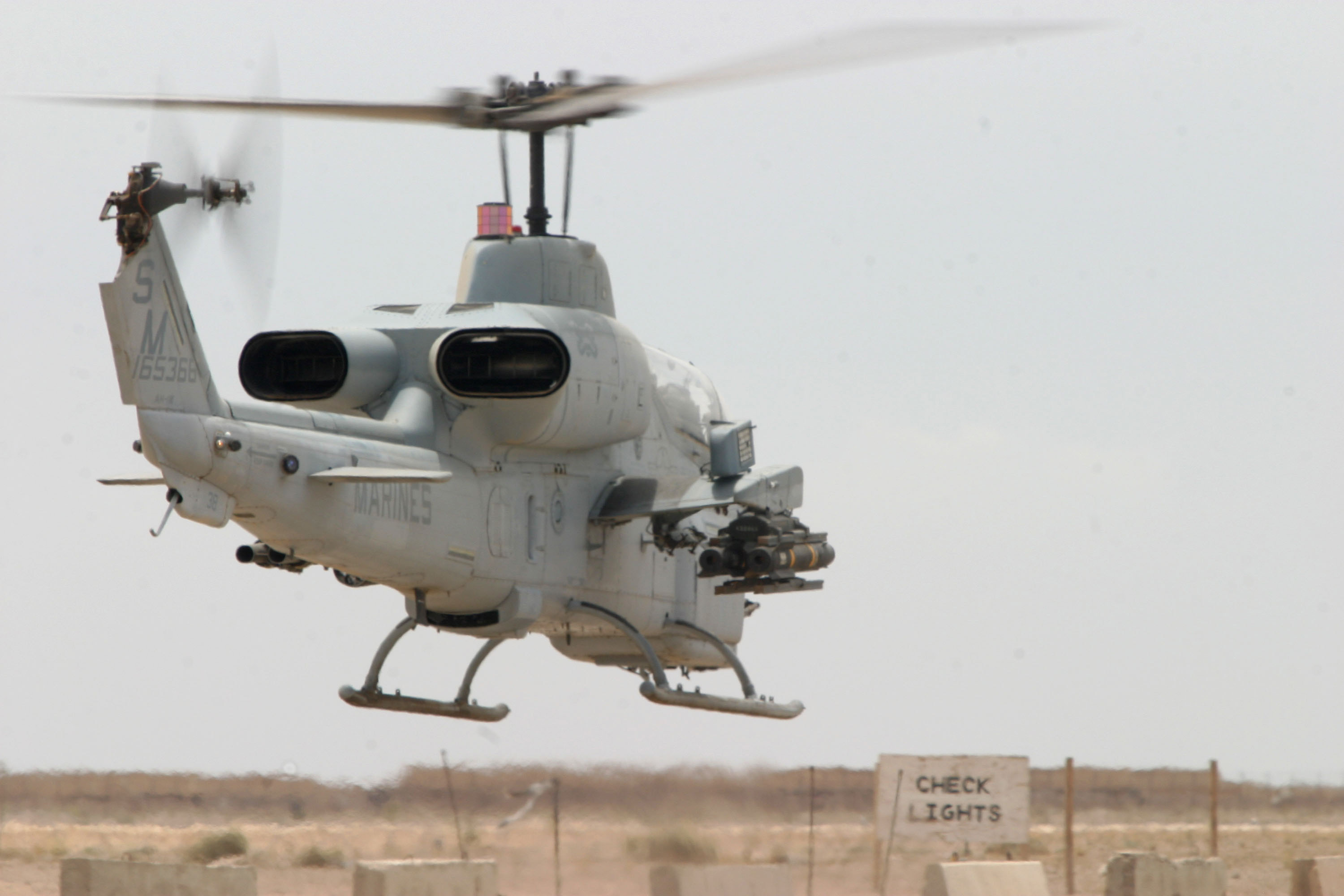
The squadron's code is seen on this HMLA-369 AH-1W Super Cobra.

SM

Assigned to	Assigned on	Notes
VS-27	July 1953	
HMLA-369	April 1972	

SN

Assigned to	Assigned on	Notes
VS-913 Re-designated VS-39	April 1951	
HMM-772 Re-designated HMH-772	April 1958	
HMLA-169	September 1971	

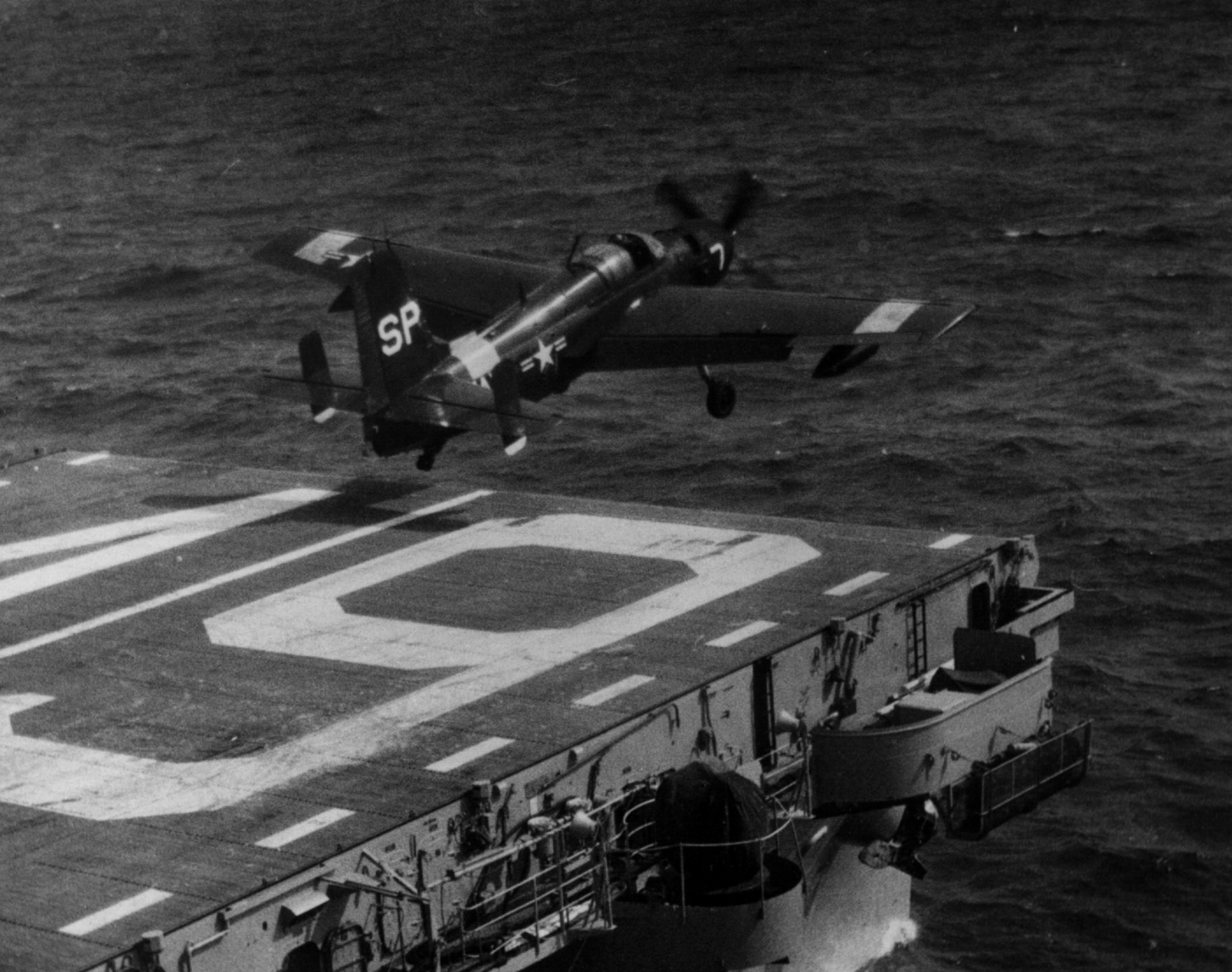
An AF-2S Guardian of anti-submarine squadron VS-31.

SP

Assigned to	Assigned on	Notes
VS-31	29 July 1950, U.S. Navy Letter ACL 43-50	

SQ

Assigned to	Assigned on	Notes
HMMT-302 Re-designated HMHT-302	November 1966	Disestablished in March 1972.

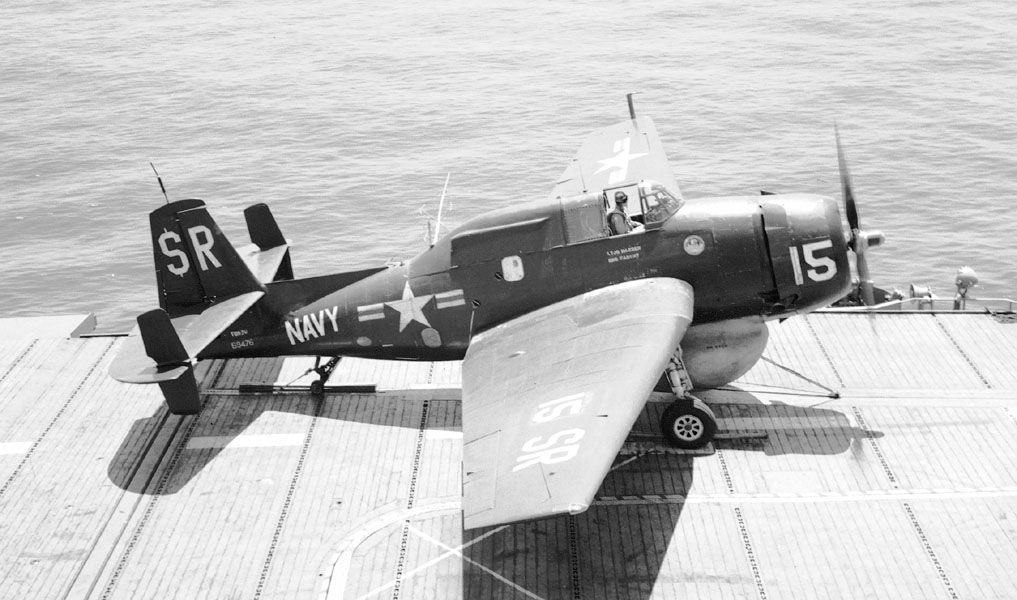
A TBM-3W Avenger from anti-submarine squadron VS-32.

SR

Assigned to	Assigned on	Notes
USS Saidor (CVE-117)	7 November 1946, U.S. Navy Letter ACL 156-46	
VMF-513	12 December 1946, U.S. Navy Letter ACL 165-46	
VS-32	29 July 1950, U.S. Navy Letter ACL 43-50	
H&MS-30, Headquarters and Maintenance Squadron 30	Circa 1970	Disestablished.

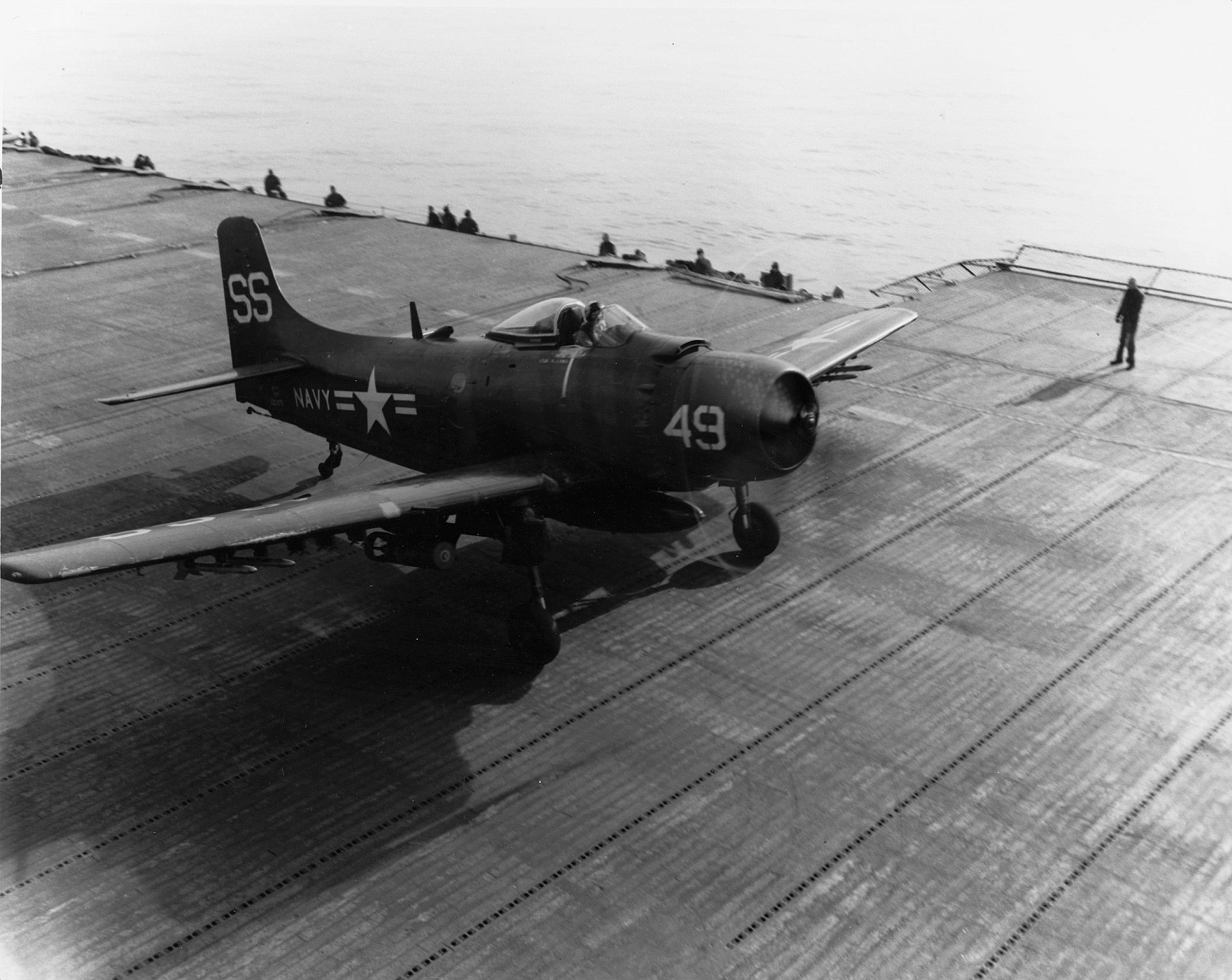
An AD-3Q Skyraider from composite squadron VC-33.

SS

Assigned to	Assigned on	Notes
USS Bon Homme Richard (CV-31)	July 1945	
USS Bennington (CV-20)	8 January 1946, U.S. Navy Letter FF12-5	
VC-33 Re-designated VA(AW)-33	1949	
VAP-61 Re-designated VCP-61 and back to VAP-61	1957	Disestablished in July 1971.

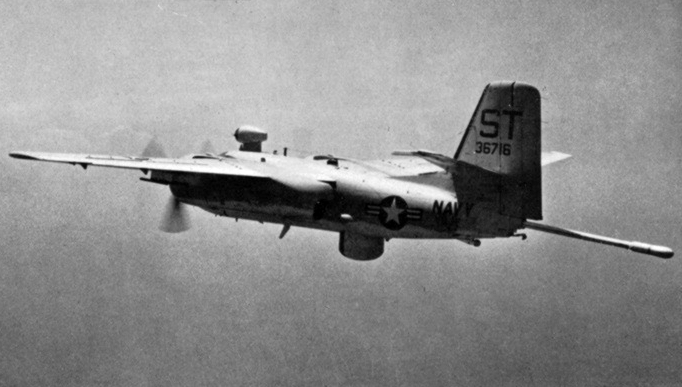
An S2F-1 Tracker of VS-38.

ST

Assigned to	Assigned on	Notes
VS-892 Re-designated VS-38	August 1950	
VS-771	1961	Deactivated in August 1962.

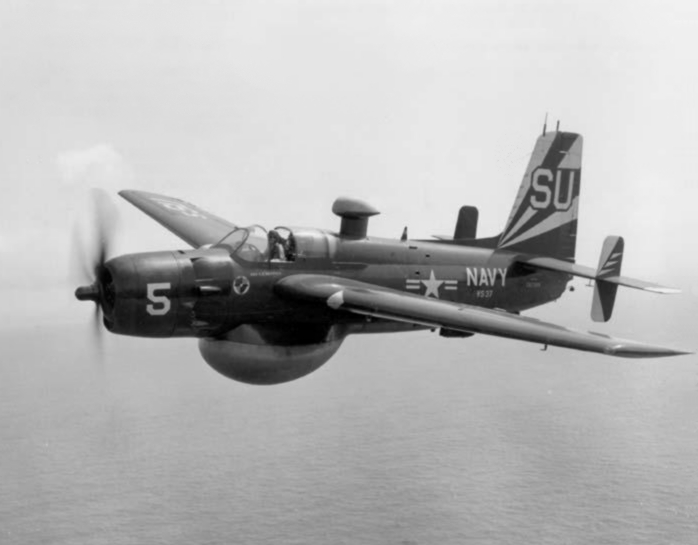
An elaborately marked AF-2W Guardian of VS-37.

SU

Assigned to	Assigned on	Notes
VS-871 Re-designated VS-37	May 1951	
VS-772	1961	Deactivated in August 1962.
HMT-301	April 1966	Disestablished in June 2005.

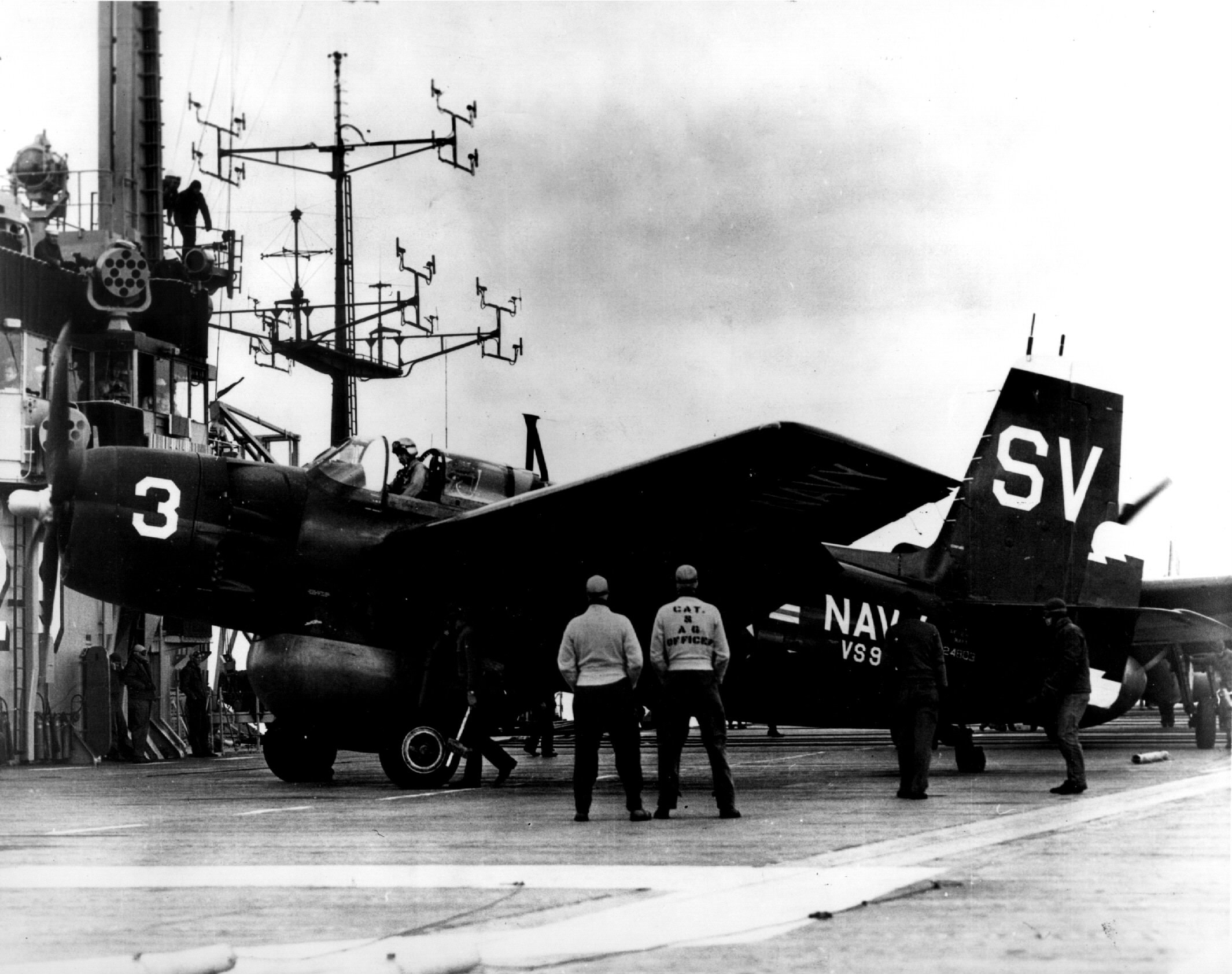
An AF-2W Guardian assigned to VS-931.

SV

Assigned to	Assigned on	Notes
VS-931 Re-designated VS-20	March 1951	Disestablished in June 1956.
VS-873	1961	Deactivated in August 1962.

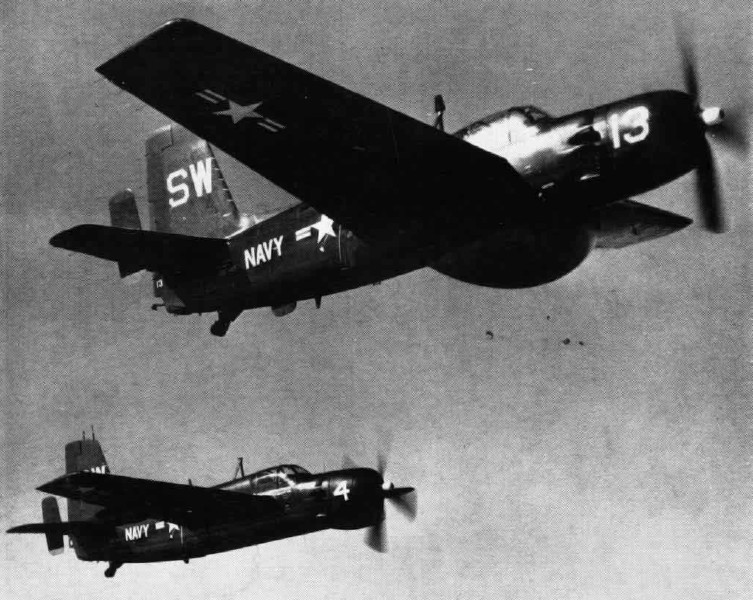
An AF-2W Guardian assigned to VS-30.

SW

Assigned to	Assigned on	Notes
VS-801 Re-designated VS-30	February 1950	
VS-872	1961	Deactivated in August 1962.

SX

Assigned to	Assigned on	Notes
VS-891	1961	Deactivated in August 1962.

SY

Assigned to	Assigned on	Notes
VS-721	1961	Deactivated in August 1962.

SZ

Assigned to	Assigned on	Notes
MARS-17, Maintenance and Repair Squadron 17 Re-designated H&MS-17, Headquarters and Maintenance Squadron 17	1957	Disestablished.

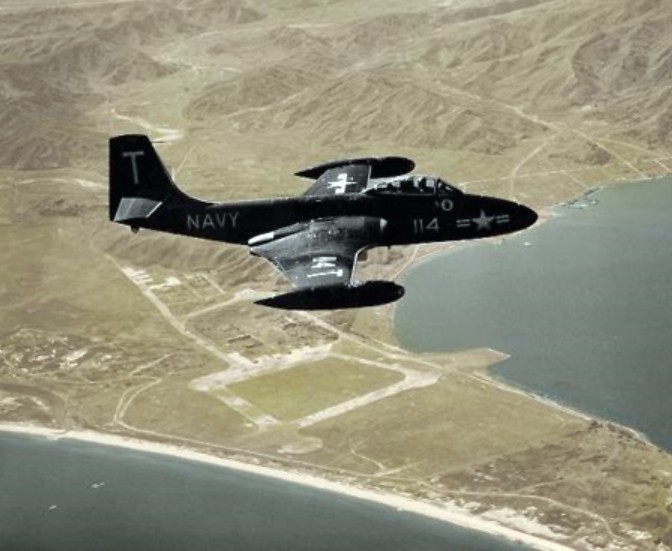
The "T" on this F2H-2 Banshee indicates assignment to Carrier Air Group 1.

T

Assigned to	Assigned on	Notes
USS Bataan (CVL-29)	July 1945	
USS Tarawa (CV-40)	8 January 1946, U.S. Navy Letter FF12-5	
CVG-1, Carrier Air Group 1	12 December 1946, U.S. Navy Letter ACL 165-46	Some CVG-1 aircraft (those belonging to VF-14), while temporary attached to an Air Task Group, rendered their tail code as "ATG", though "ATG" was never authorized as a unit code. The Group's tail code was changed to "AB" in November 1956.
NAS Seattle	November 1946	Code changed to "7T" in 1956.
NAS Birmingham	August 1950	Code changed to "5T" in 1956.

TA

Assigned to	Assigned on	Notes
HS-4	1957	
HSL-51 Re-designated HSM-51	1980s	

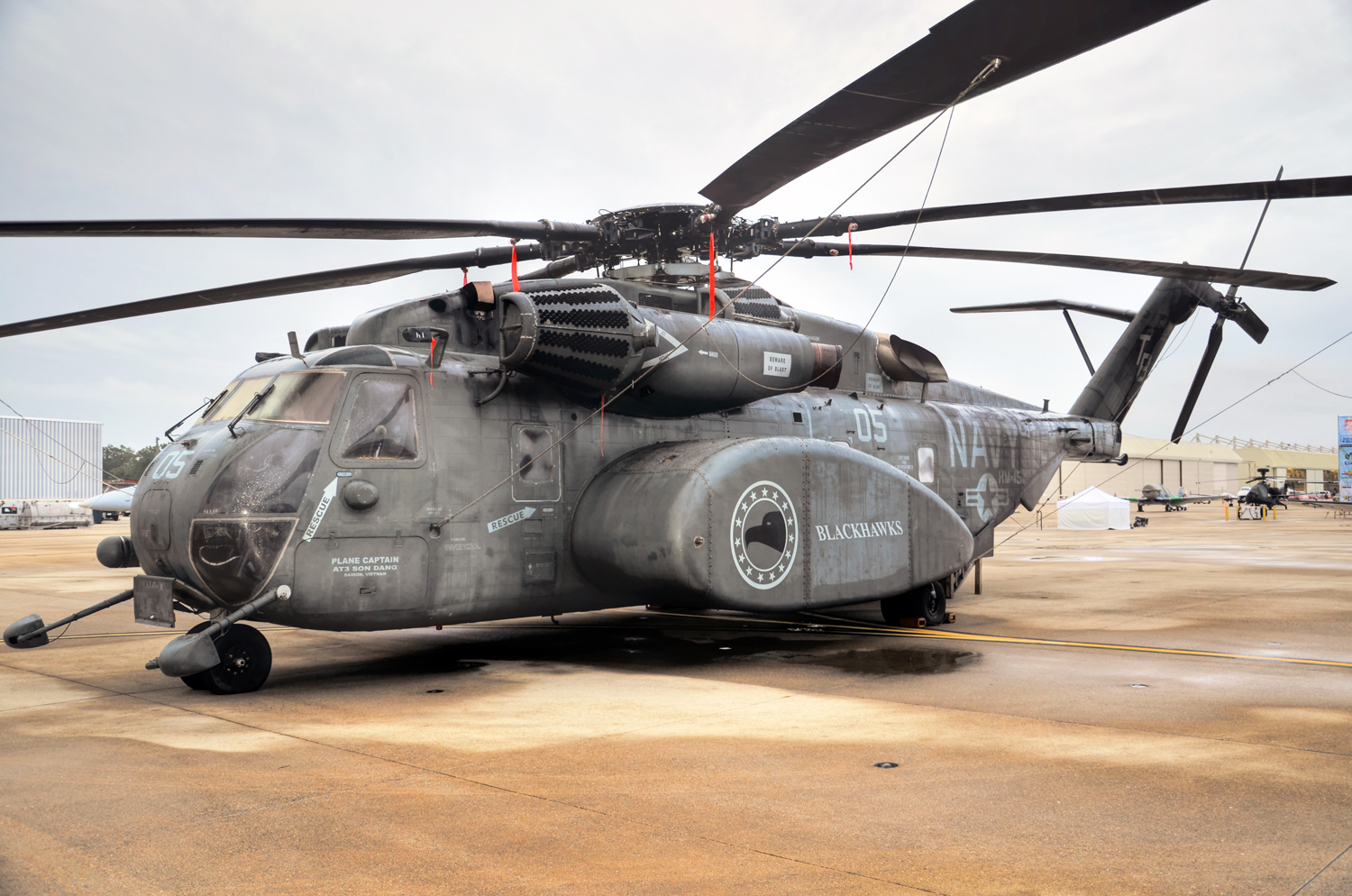
An MH-53E Sea Dragon of HM-15.

TB

Assigned to	Assigned on	Notes
VAH-1	November 1955	Code changed to "GH" in 1957.
HM-15	January 1987	

TC

Assigned to	Assigned on	Notes
VQ-3	July 1968	The squadron's aircraft rarely if ever have their assigned tail code applied.

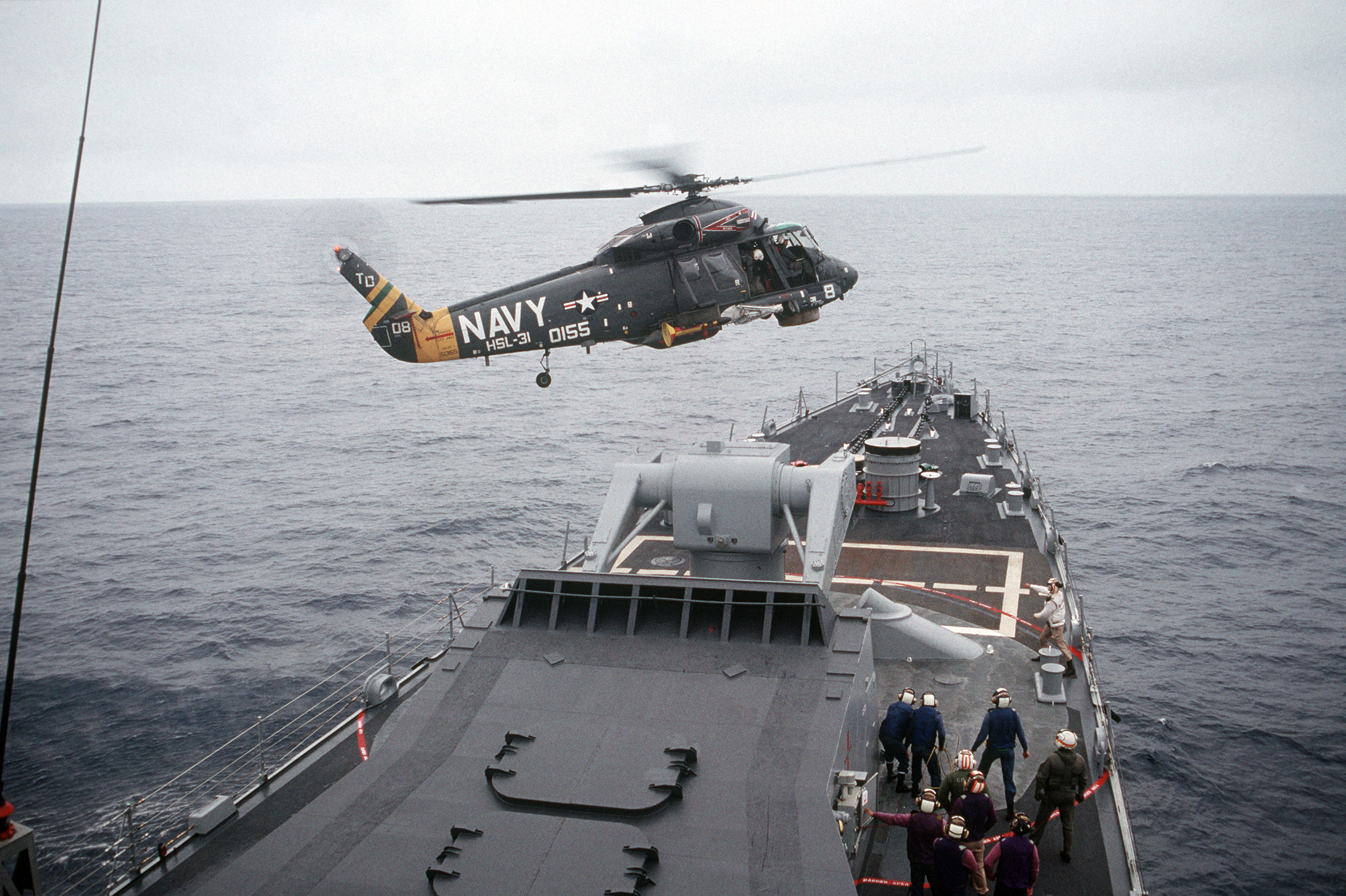
A Kaman SH-2F Seasprite assigned to HSL-31.

TD

Assigned to	Assigned on	Notes
HC-5 Redesignated HSL-31	September 1967	Disestablished in June 1992.

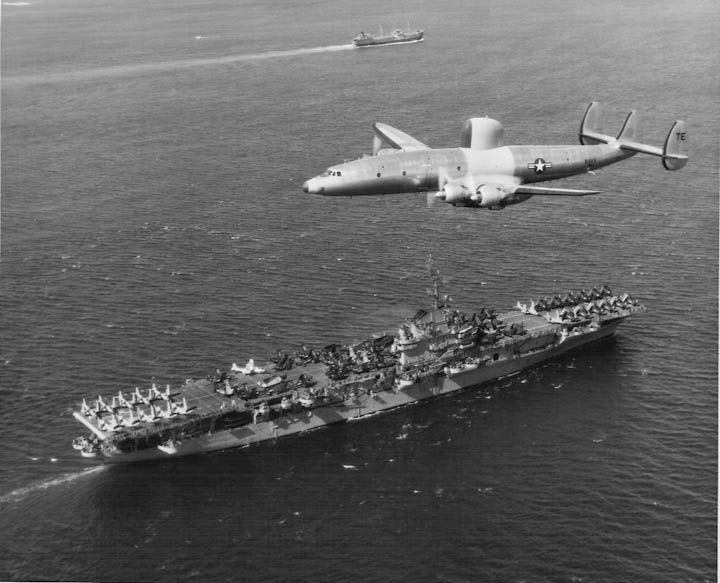
A Lockheed WV-2 Warning Star assigned to early warning squadron VW-1.

TE

Assigned to	Assigned on	Notes
VW-1	June 1952	Disestablished in June 1971.

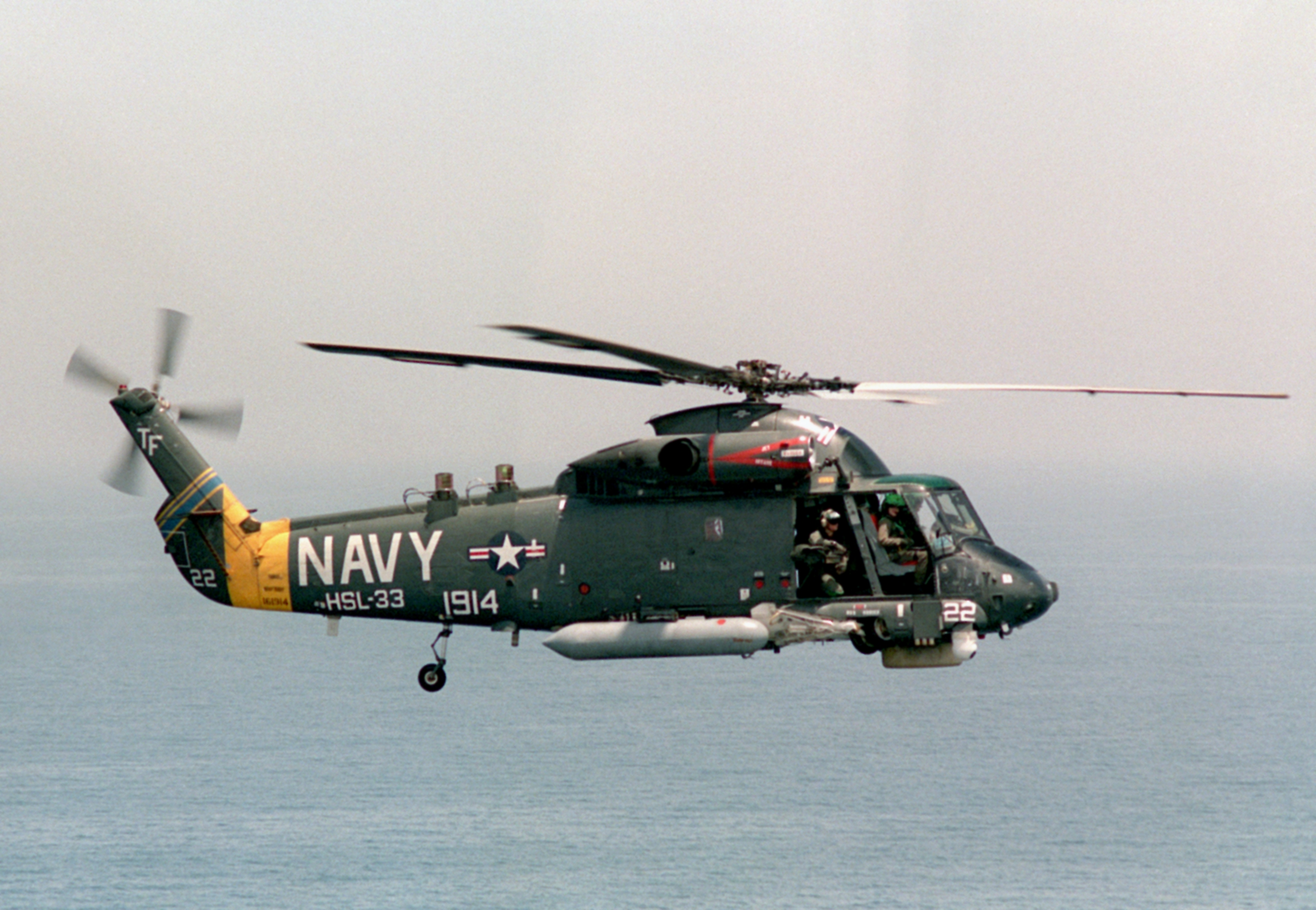
An excellent view of a SH-2F Seasprite of HSL-33.

TF

Assigned to	Assigned on	Notes
VW-2	1955	Changed to MG in 1957
HSL-33	July 1973	

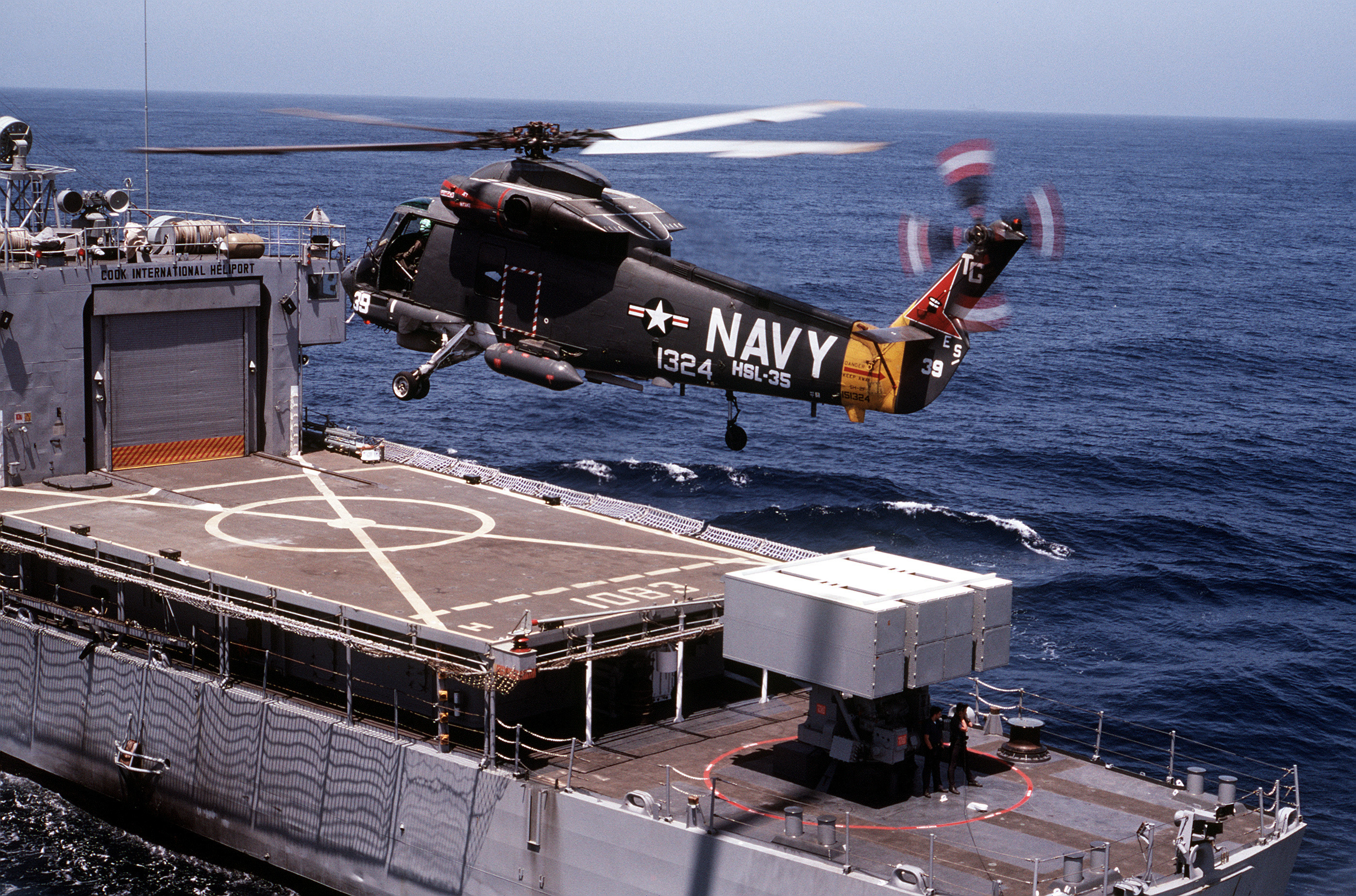
An SH-2F Seasprite assigned to HSL-35.

TG

Assigned to	Assigned on	Notes
HSL-35	January 1974	Disestablished in December 1992
HSM-35	May 2013	

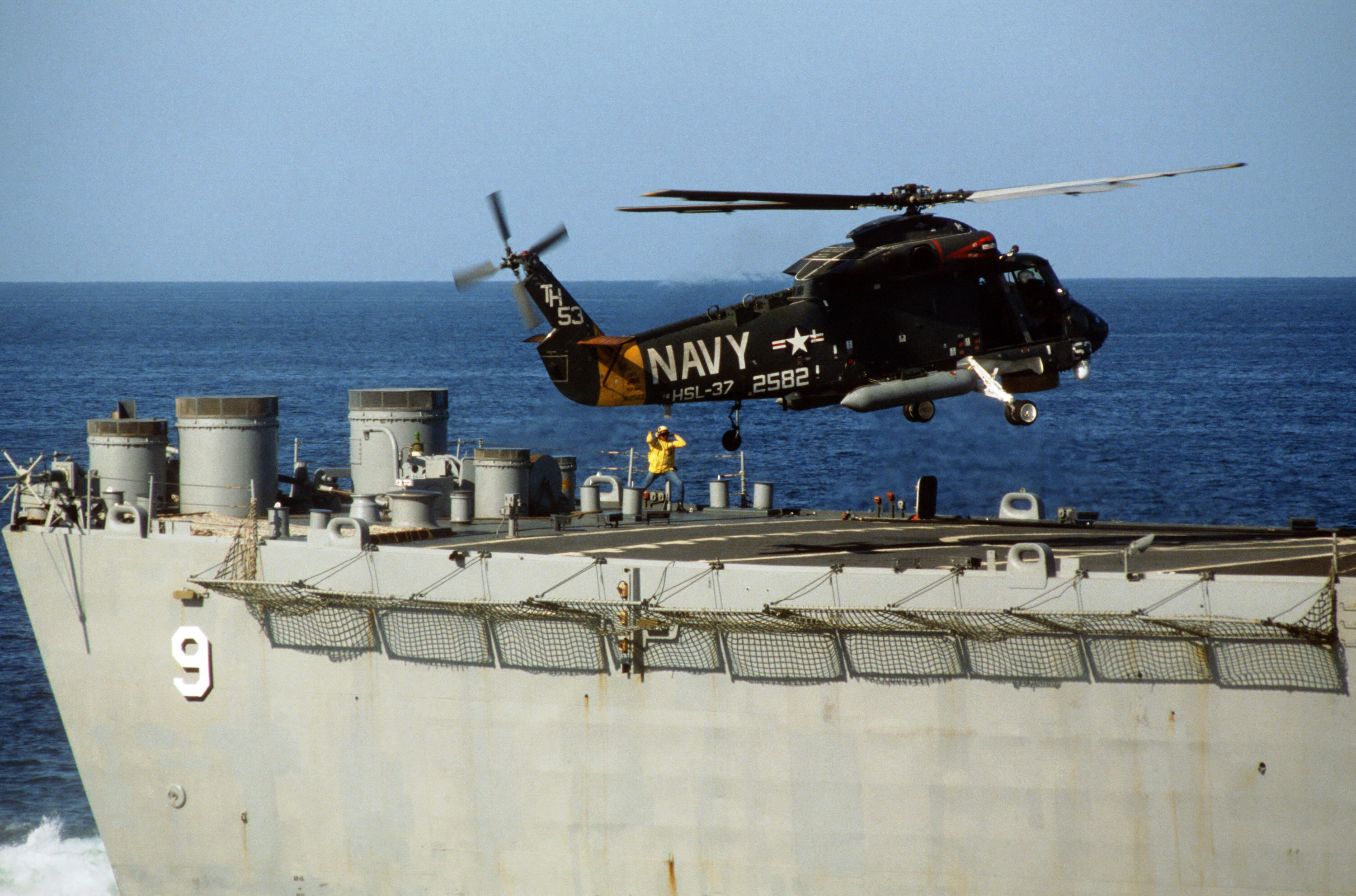
An SH-2F Seasprite assigned to HSL-37.

TH

Assigned to	Assigned on	Notes
VW-4	Mid 1950s	Tail code changed to "MH" in 1957.
HSL-37 Re-designated HSM-37	July 1975	

TJ

Assigned to	Assigned on	Notes
VW-11	August 1955	Disestablished.

TK

Assigned to	Assigned on	Notes
VW-13	September 1955	Disestablished in 1957.

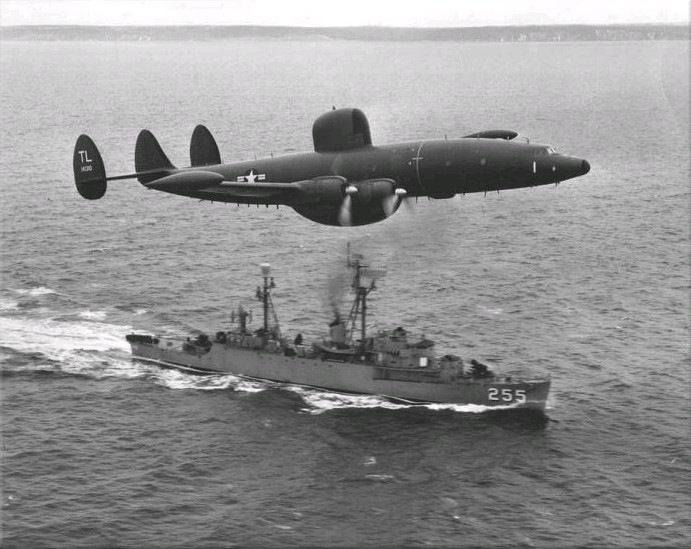
A Lockheed WV-2 Warning Star assigned to early warning squadron VW-15.

TL

Assigned to	Assigned on	Notes
VC-62	Circa 1948	Tail code changed to "PL" circa 1950.
VW-15	October 1955	Disestablished.

TM

Assigned to	Assigned on	Notes
H&MS-11, Headquarters and Maintenance Squadron 11	1957	Disestablished.

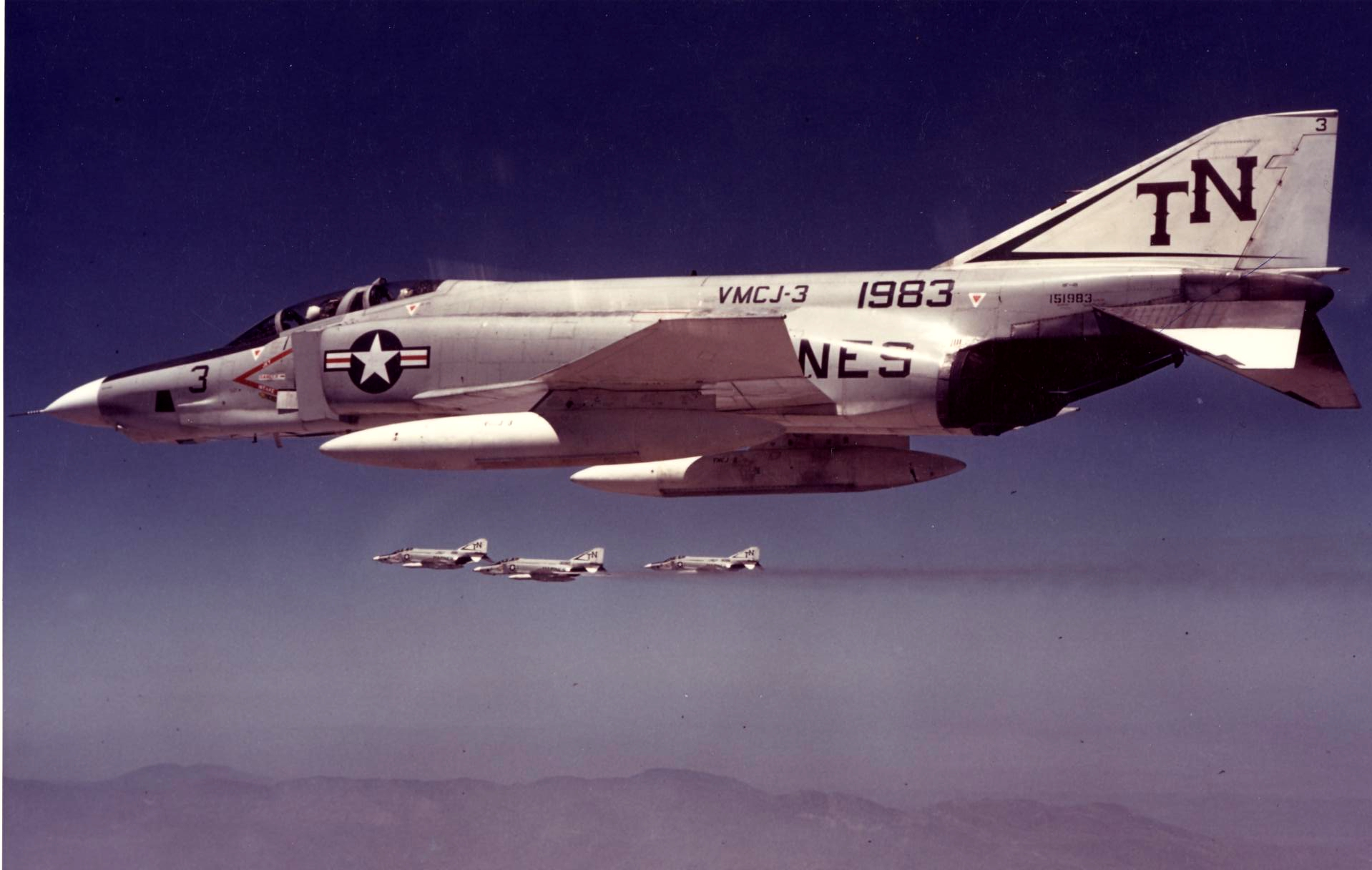
A flight of VMCJ-3 RF-4B Phantoms display the squadron's "TN" tail code.

TN

Assigned to	Assigned on	Notes
VMC-3 Re-designated VMCJ-3	October 1952	Re-designated to VMFP-3 in 1975, tail code changed to "RF"

TP

Assigned to	Assigned on	Notes
VJ-62 Re-designated VAP-62	April 1952	Tail code changed to "GB" in 1957.

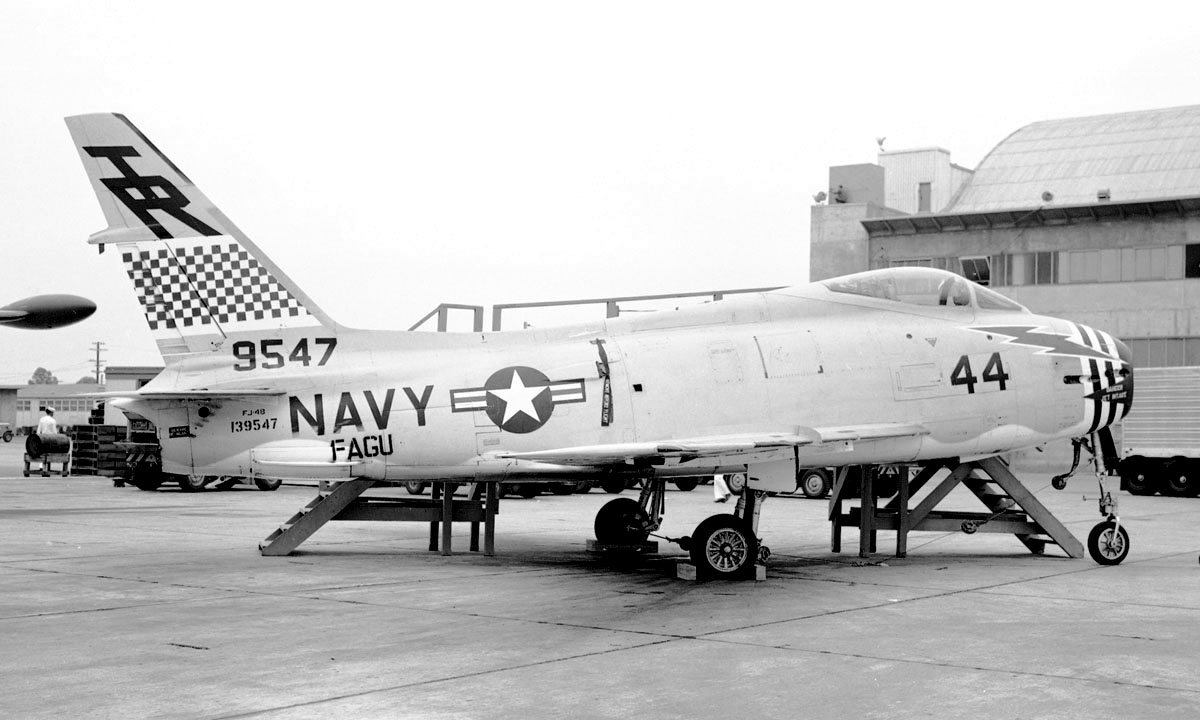
A stylized "TR" tail code is seen on this FJ-4B assigned to Fleet Air Gunnery Unit Pacific.

TR

Assigned to	Assigned on	Notes
FAGUPAC, Fleet Air Gunnery Unit Pacific	1952	Disestablished in February 1960.
VAQ-129, VAQ-130	September 1970	

TS

Assigned to	Assigned on	Notes
HSL-41 Re-designated HSM-41	January 1983	

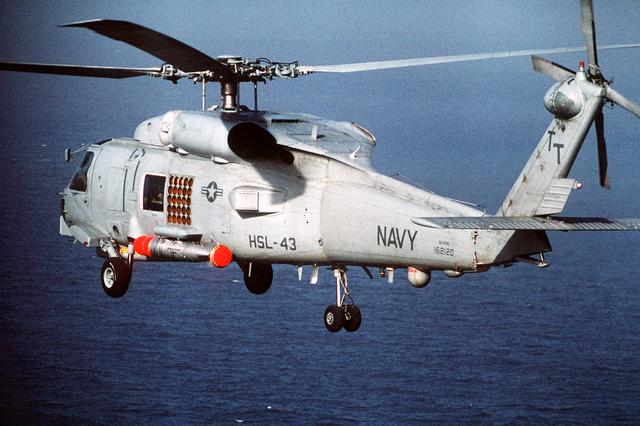
An SH-60B Seahawk of HSL-43..

TT

Assigned to	Assigned on	Notes
USS Bennington (CV-20)	July 1945	
USS Ticonderoga (CV-14)	8 January 1946, U.S. Navy Letter FF12-5	Only in effect until December 1946.
VF(AW)-3	1957	Disestablished in 1958.
RVAW-110	Circa 1971	Disestablished in May 1983.
HSL-43	October 1984	

TV

Assigned to	Assigned on	Notes
HML-167 Re-designated HMLA-167	April 1968	

TX

Assigned to	Assigned on	Notes
HSL-49 Re-designated HSM-49	Circa 1980	

TY

Assigned to	Assigned on	Notes
HSL-47	Circa 1980	

TZ

Assigned to	Assigned on	Notes
HSL-45	October 1986	

U

Assigned to	Assigned on	Notes
USS Hancock (CV-19)	July 1945	
USS Bunker Hill (CV-17)	8 January 1946, U.S. Navy Letter FF12-5	Only in effect until December 1946. USS Bunker Hill has never returned to duty as an active carrier after heavy damage received on 11 May 1945, so this code was probably never applied in practice.
NAS St. Louis	November 1946	Code changed to "7U" in 1956.
ATG-1, Air Task Group 1	Circa 1950	Tail code changed to "NA" in November 1956.

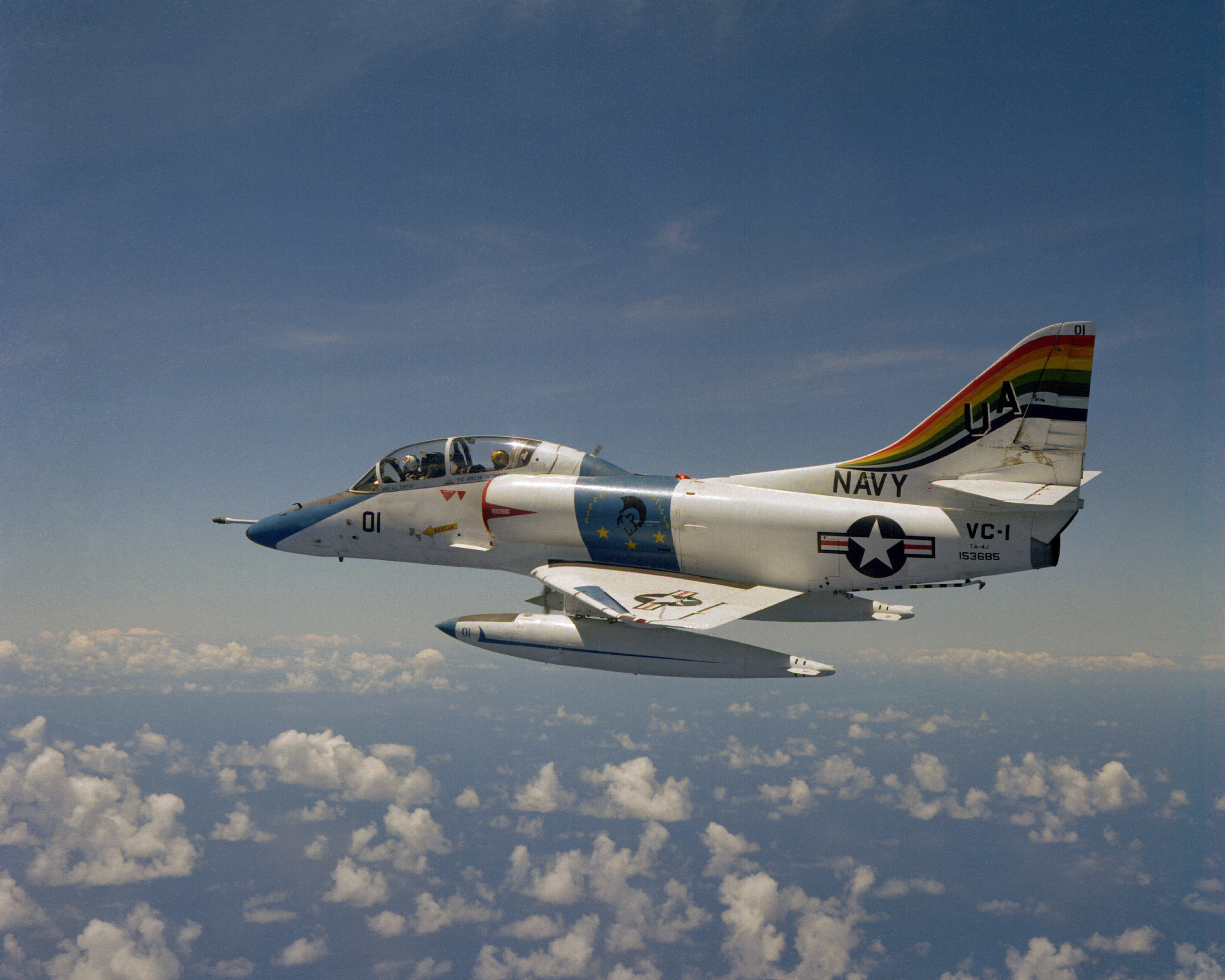
A colourful TA-4J Skyhawk shows the "UA" code of composite squadron VC-1.

UA

Assigned to	Assigned on	Notes
Attack units of Navy Air Reserve at NAS St. Louis	November 1946	A very short-lived assignment.
VU-1 Re-designated VC-1	7 November 1946, U.S. Navy Letter ACL 156-46	Disestablished in May 1992.

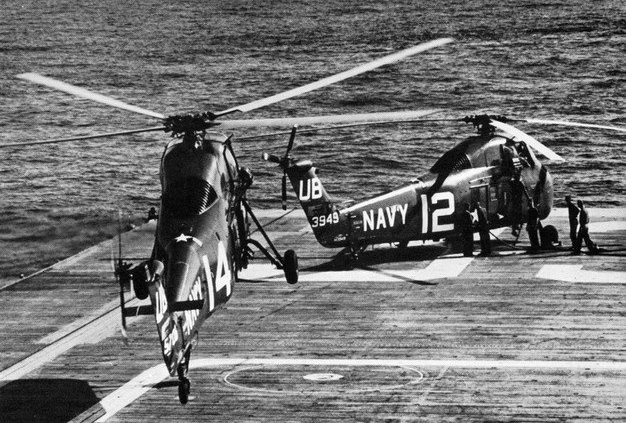
The "UB" on the tail boom of this HSS-1 Seabat indicates assignment to HS-6.

UB

Assigned to	Assigned on	Notes
VU-2	7 November 1946, U.S. Navy Letter ACL 156-46	
VO-1	4 August 1948, U.S. Navy Letter ACL 69-48	
HS-6 Re-designated HSC-6	1957	

UC

Assigned to	Assigned on	Notes
VU-3	7 November 1946, U.S. Navy Letter ACL 156-46	
VO-2	4 August 1948, U.S. Navy Letter ACL 69-48	
HS-5 Re-designated HSC-5	January 1953	

UD

Assigned to	Assigned on	Notes
VU-4	7 November 1946, U.S. Navy Letter ACL 156-46	Tail code changed to "JF" in 1957.

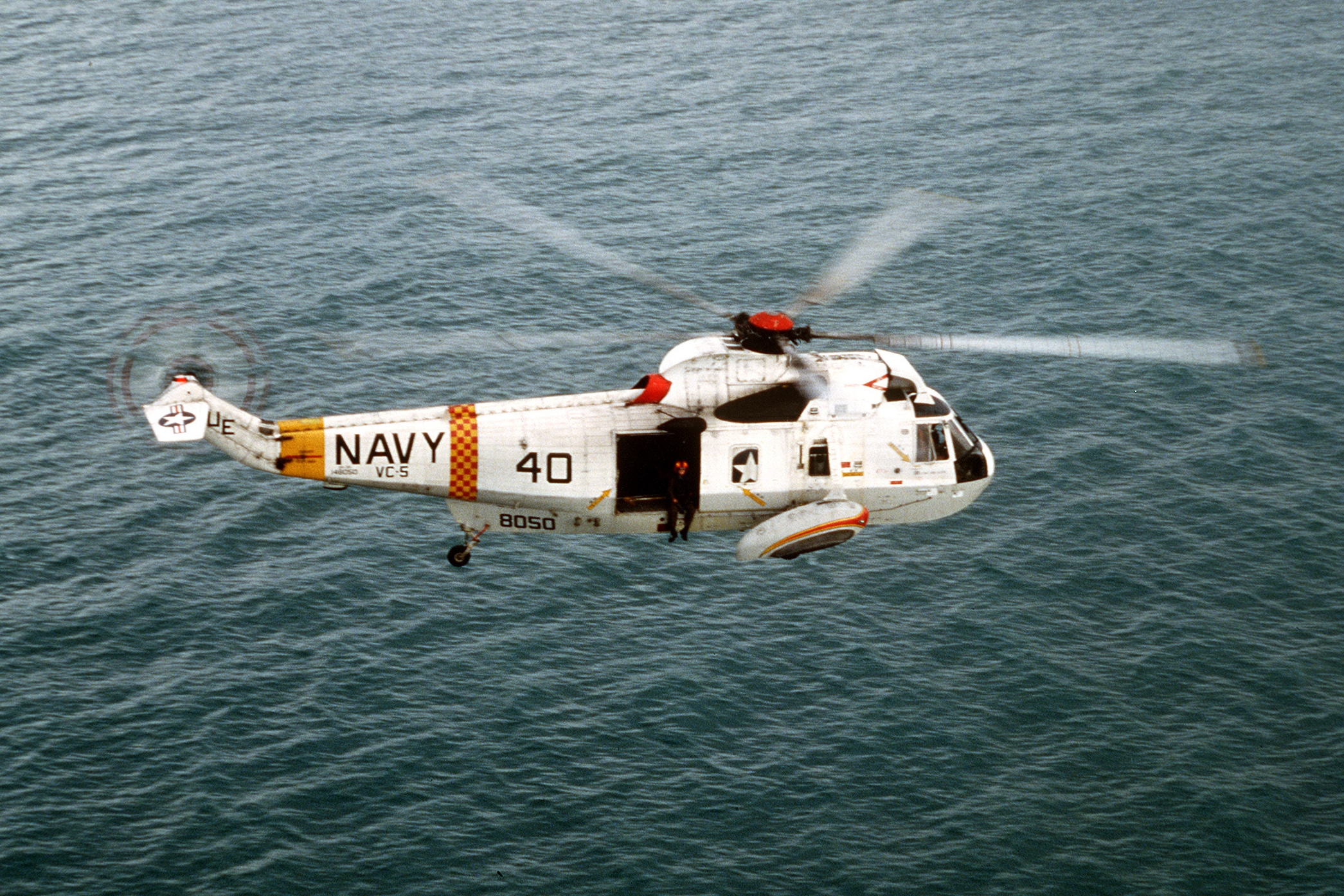
An SH-3G Sea King assigned to VC-5.

UE

Assigned to	Assigned on	Notes
VU-5 Re-designated VC-5	7 November 1946, U.S. Navy Letter ACL 156-46	Disestablished in August 1992.

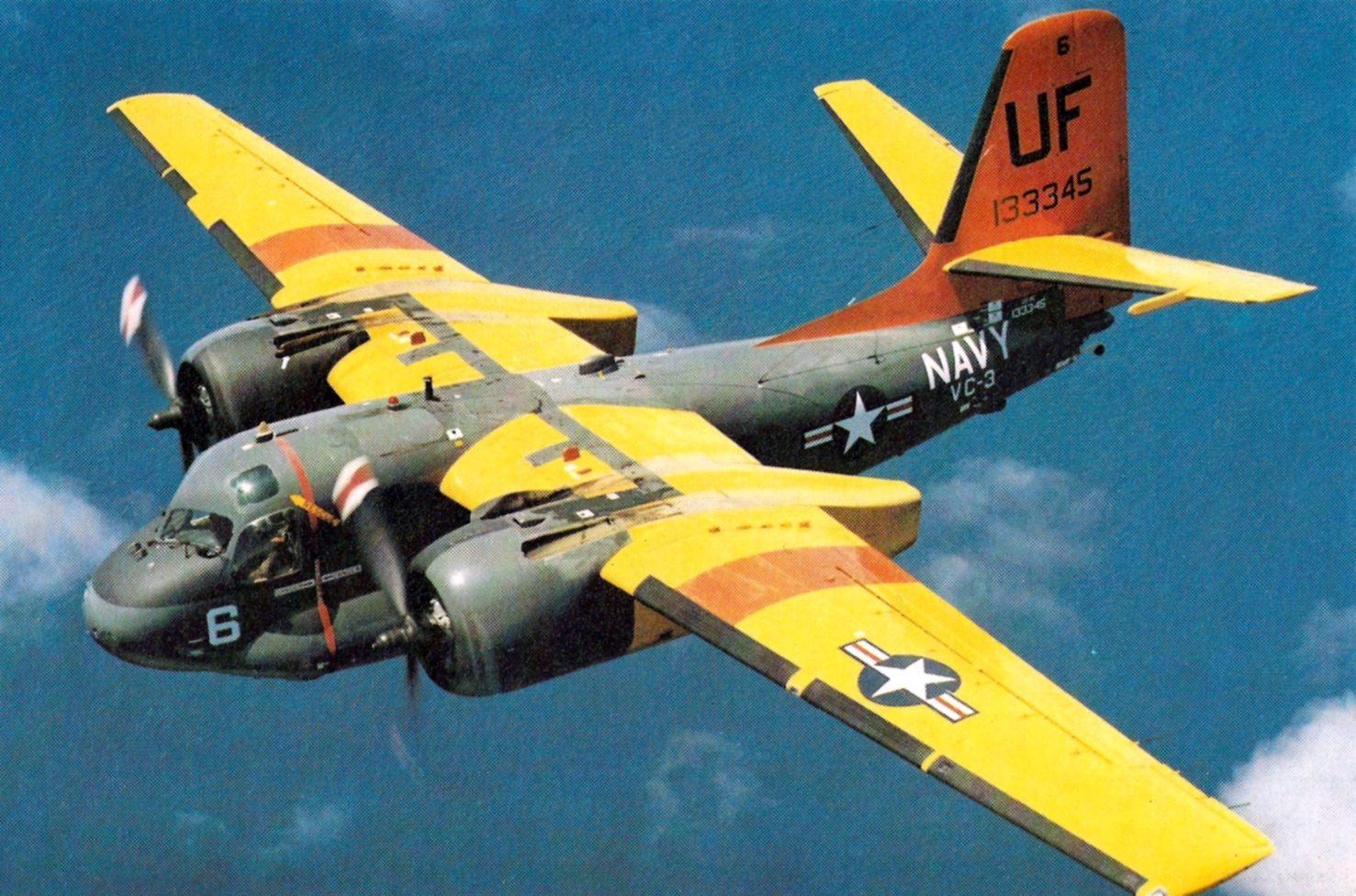
A Grumman US-2C from composite squadron VC-3.

UF

Assigned to	Assigned on	Notes
VU-6	7 November 1946, U.S. Navy Letter ACL 156-46	
Fighter units of Navy Air Reserve at NAS St. Louis	November 1946	A very short-lived assignment.
VU-3 Re-designated VC-3	1948	Disestablished in September 1980.

UG

Assigned to	Assigned on	Notes
VU-6	March 1952	Tail code changed to "JG" in 1957.

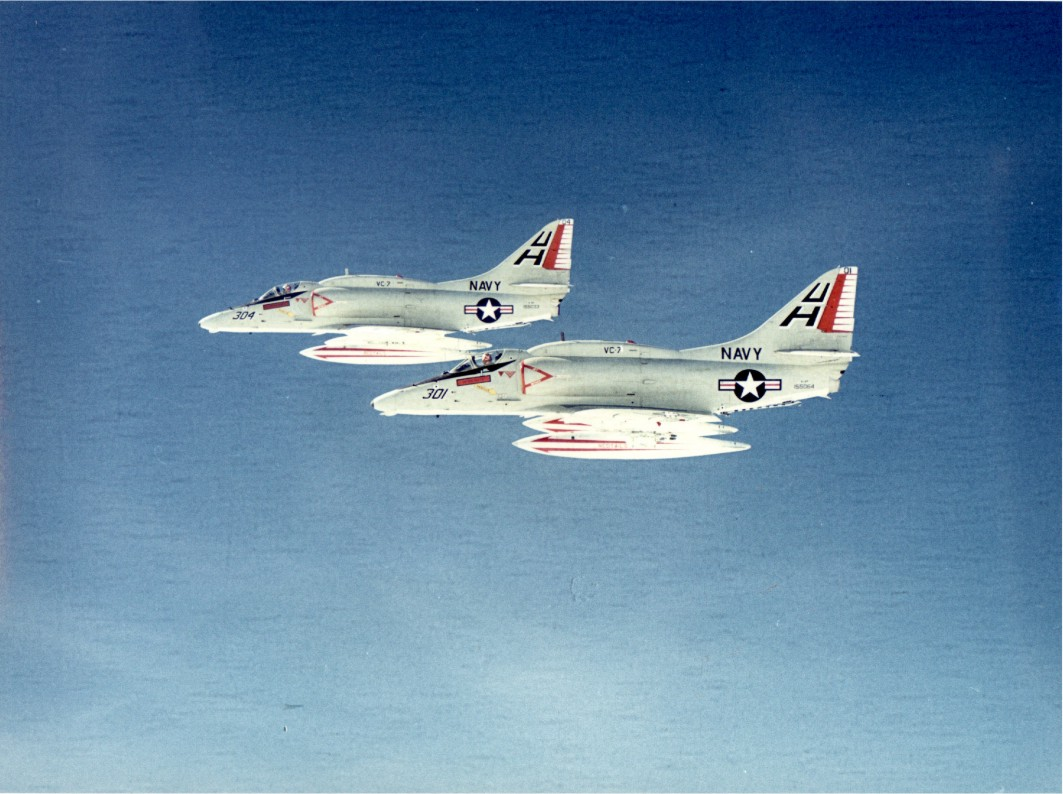
A pair of A-4F Skyhawks from composite squadron VC-7.

UH

Assigned to	Assigned on	Notes
VU-7 Re-designated VC-7	7 November 1946, U.S. Navy Letter ACL 156-46	Disestablished in September 1980.

UI

Assigned to	Assigned on	Notes
VU-8	7 November 1946, U.S. Navy Letter ACL 156-46	Disestablished.

UJ

Assigned to	Assigned on	Notes
VU-2 Re-designated VC-4	January 1952	Disestablished.

UK

Assigned to	Assigned on	Notes
VU-9	7 November 1946, U.S. Navy Letter ACL 156-46	Disestablished.

UL

Assigned to	Assigned on	Notes
VU-10	7 November 1946, U.S. Navy Letter ACL 156-46	Code changed to "JH" in 1957.

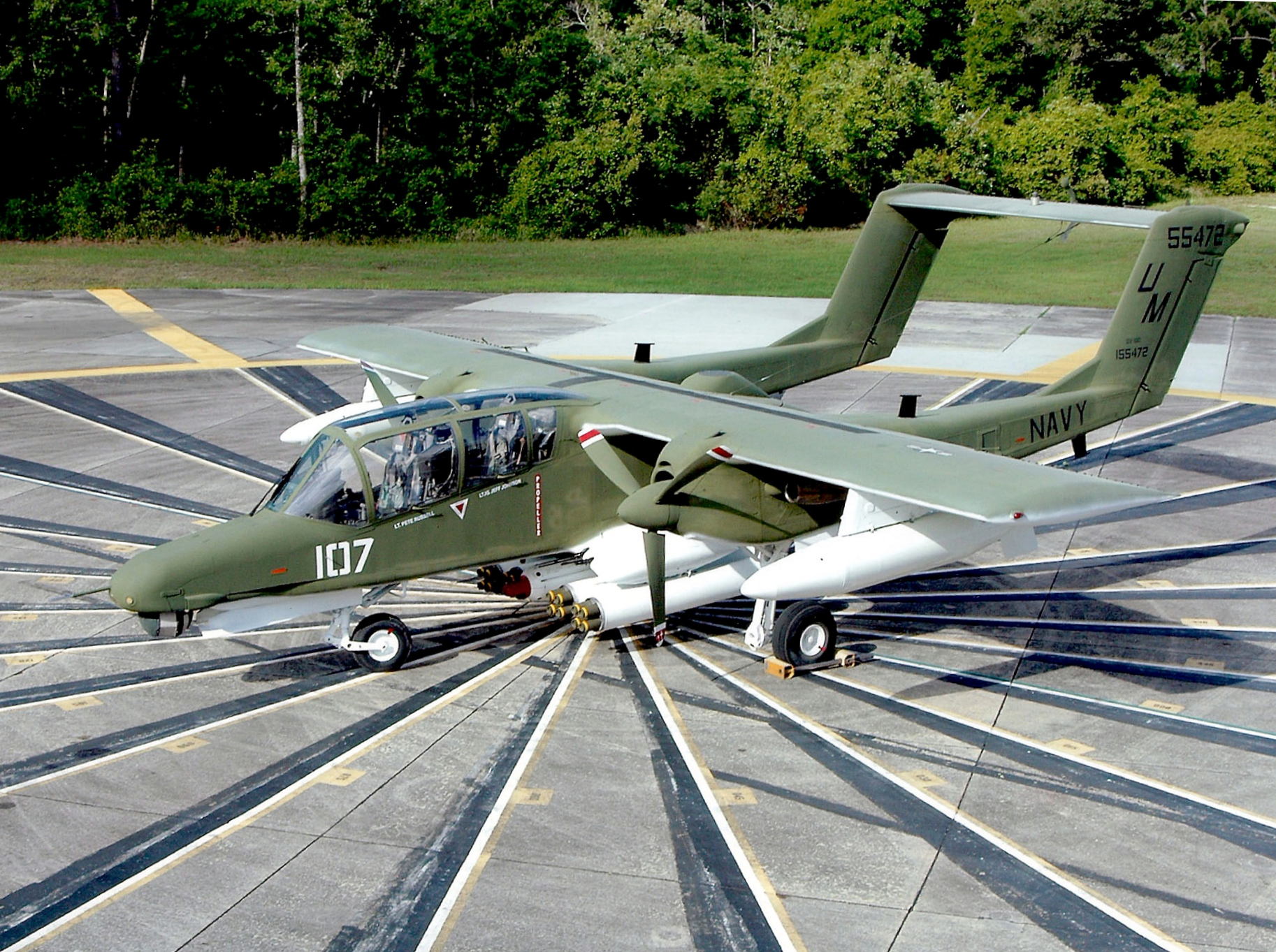
The "UM" tail code on this OV-10 Bronco indicates assignment to VAL-4.

UM

Assigned to	Assigned on	Notes
VAL-4	January 1969	Disestablished in April 1972.

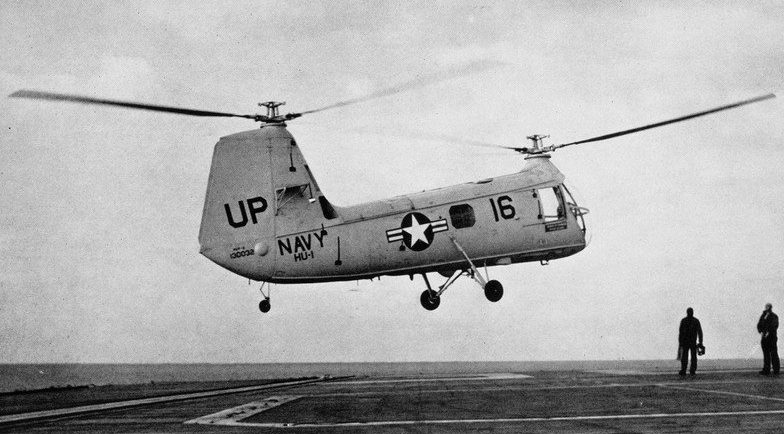
A Piasecki HUP-2 Retriever of Helicopter Utility Squadron HU-1.

UP

Assigned to	Assigned on	Notes
Patrol units of Navy Air Reserve at NAS St. Louis	November 1946	A very short-lived assignment.
HU-1 Re-designated HC-1	4 August 1948, U.S. Navy Letter ACL 69-48	Disestablished in April 1994.

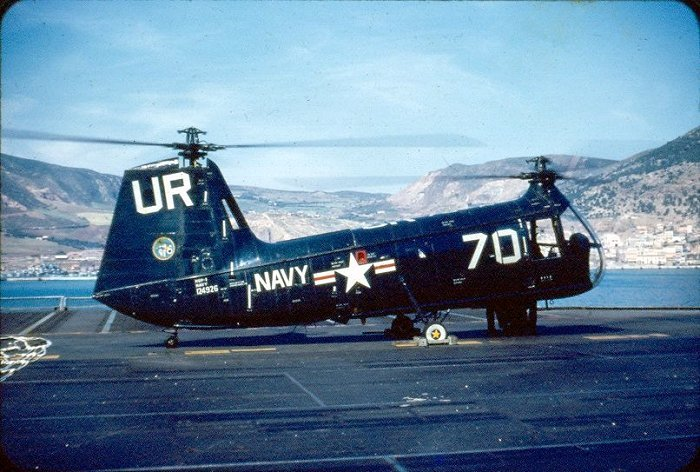
A Piasecki HUP-1 Retriever of Helicopter Utility Squadron HU-2.

UR

Assigned to	Assigned on	Notes
HU-2 Re-designated HC-2.	4 August 1948, U.S. Navy Letter ACL 69-48	Disestablished in September 1977.

UT

Assigned to	Assigned on	Notes
HMMT-302 Re-designated HMHT-302	November 1966	

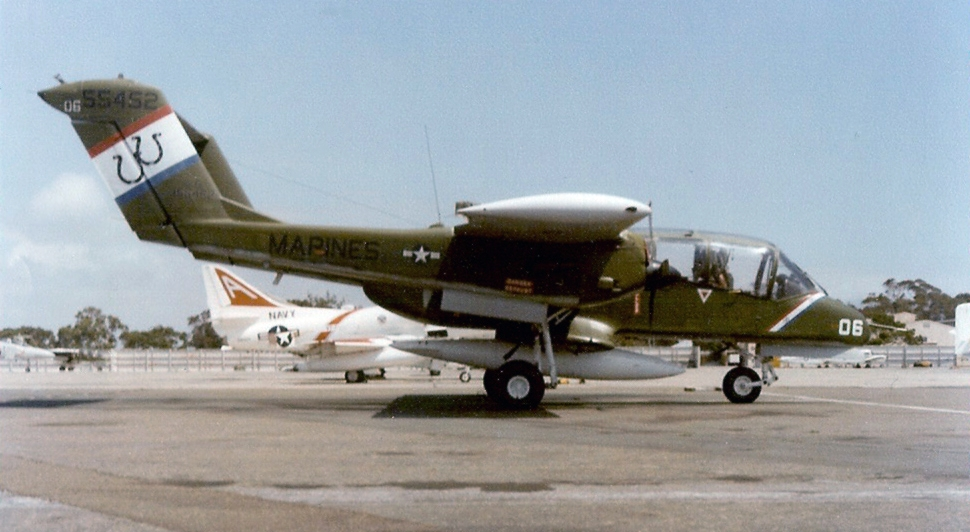
Stylized "UU" decorates the tail of this OV-10A Bronco from VMO-2.

UU

Assigned to	Assigned on	Notes
USS Cabot (CVL-28)	8 January 1946, U.S. Navy Letter FF12-5	Only in effect until December 1946.
VMO-2	April 1974	Disestablished in May 1993.

UV

Assigned to	Assigned on	Notes
VMO-5 Subsequently, re-designated HML-267 and HMLA-267	December 1967	

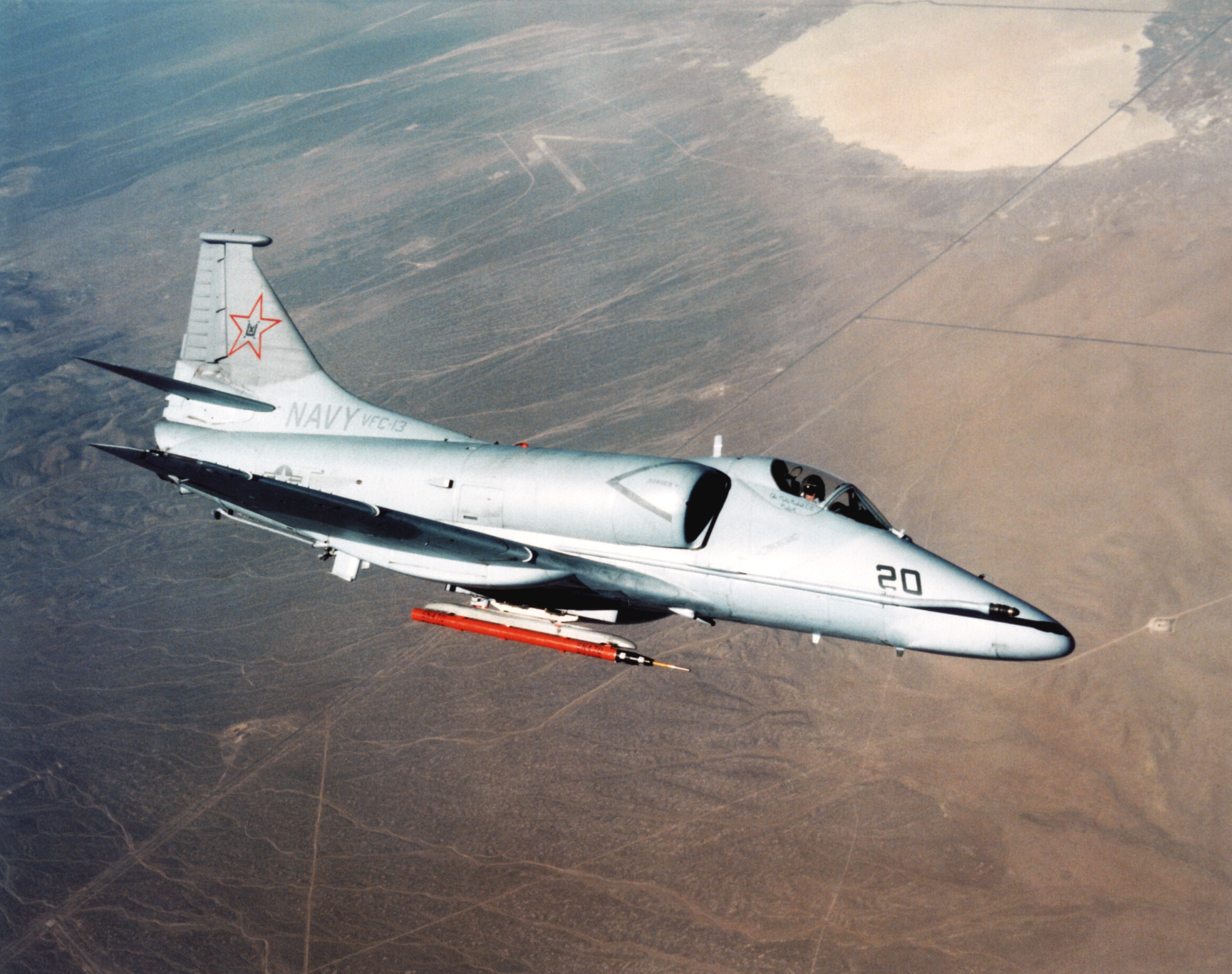
The squadron's "UX" tail code on this Skyhawk from VFC-13 is cleverly disguised.

UX

Assigned to	Assigned on	Notes
VC-13 Re-designated VFC-13	September 1973	Tail code changed to "AF" in the 1990s.

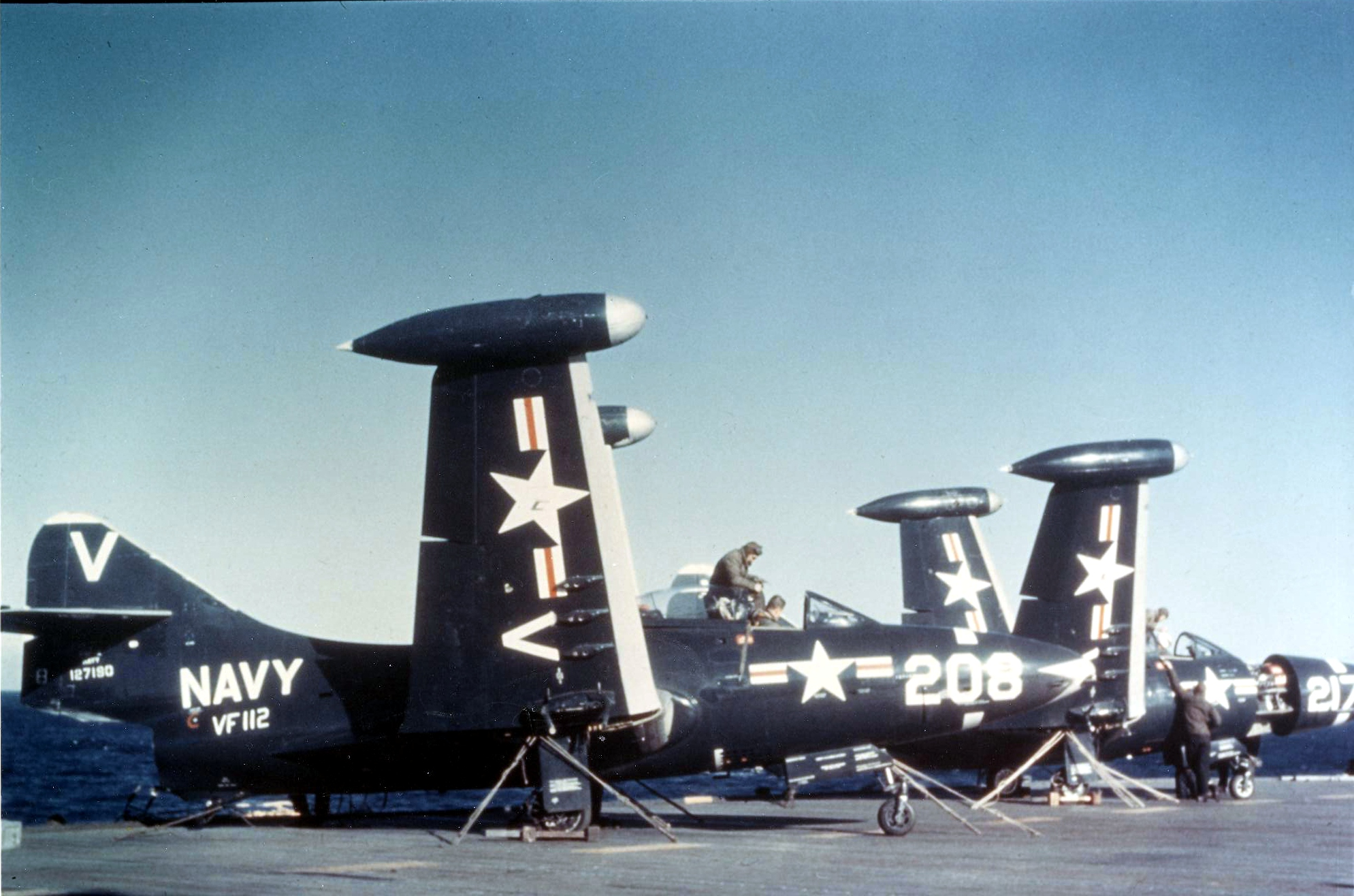
The "V" on this F9F-2 Panther indicates assignment to CVG-11.

V

Assigned to	Assigned on	Notes
USS Ticonderoga (CV-14)	July 1945	
USS Valley Forge (CV-45)	8 January 1946, U.S. Navy Letter FF12-5	
CVG-11, Carrier Air Group 11	12 December 1946, U.S. Navy Letter ACL 165-46	Tail code changed to "NH" in November 1956.
NAS Glenview	November 1946	Code changed to "7V" in 1956.

VA

Assigned to	Assigned on	Notes
Attack units of Navy Air Reserve at NAS Glenview	November 1946	A very short-lived assignment.
VW-14	1957	Disestablished in February 1960.

VB

Assigned to	Assigned on	Notes
HS-8 Re-designated HSC-8	1957	

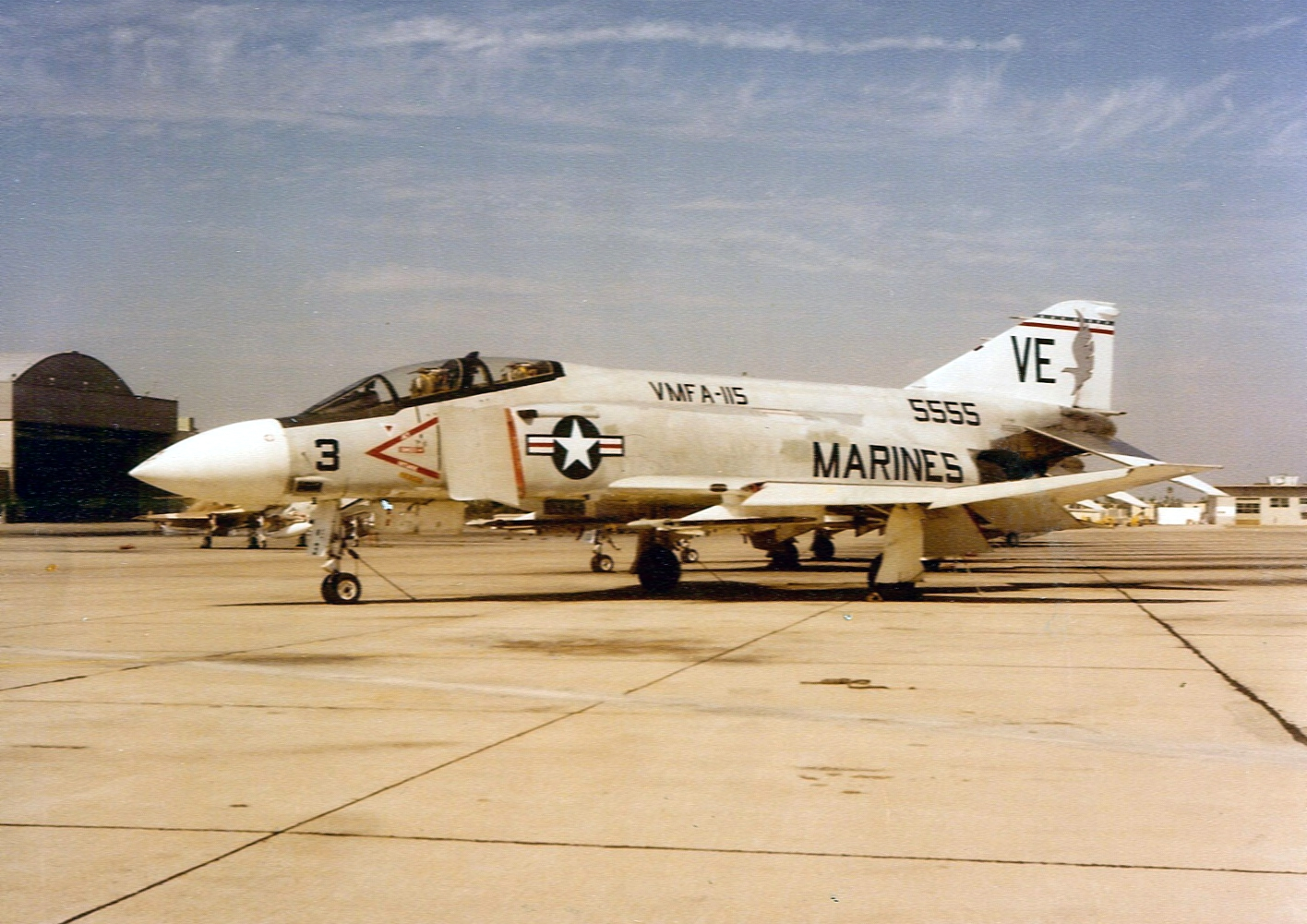
An F-4J Phantom II of VMFA-115.

VE

Assigned to	Assigned on	Notes
VMF(AW)-115 Re-designated VMFA-115	1957	

VF

Assigned to	Assigned on	Notes
Fighter units of Navy Air Reserve at NAS Glenview	November 1946	A very short-lived assignment.

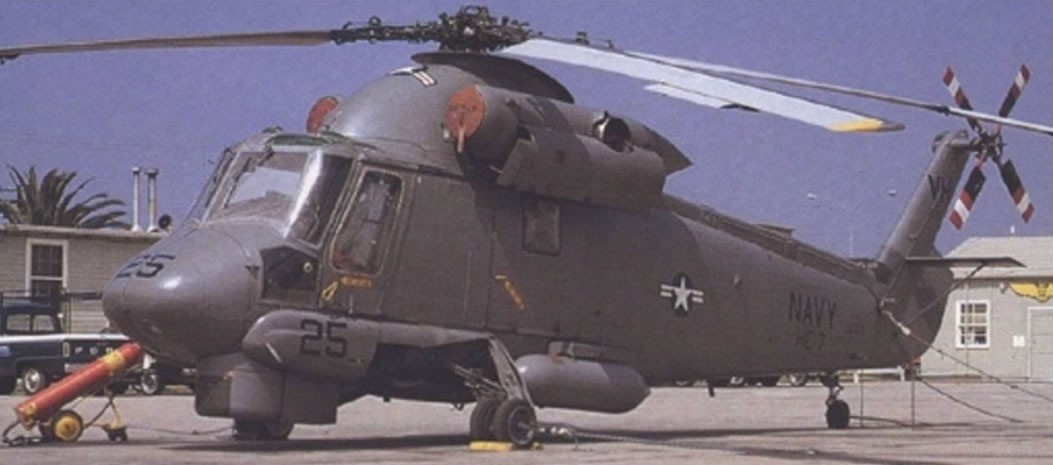
The squadron's tail code is barely discernable on this HH-2C assigned to VH-7.

VH

Assigned to	Assigned on	Notes
HC-7	September 1967	Disestablished in June 1975.

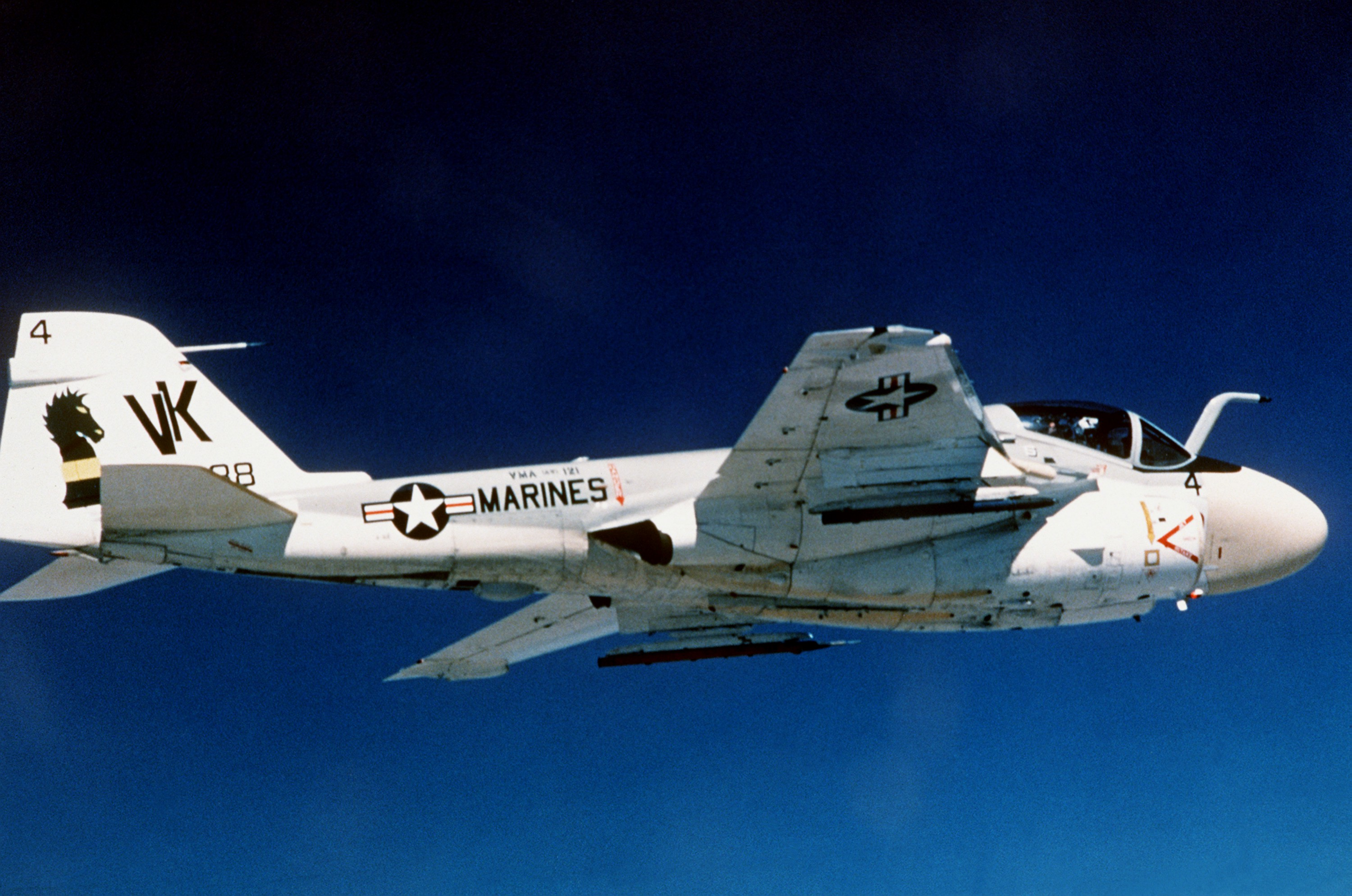
An A-6E Intruder of VMA(AW)-121.

VK

Assigned to	Assigned on	Notes
VMA-121 Subsequently, re-designated VMA(AW)-121 and VMFA-121	1957	

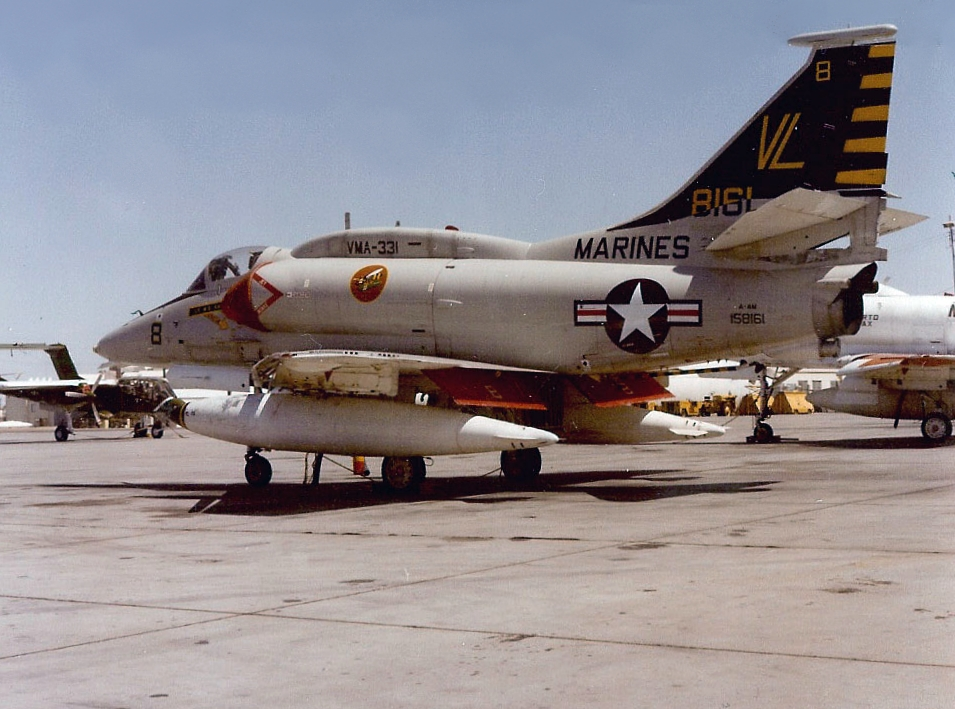
An A-4M Skyhawk of VMA-331.

VL

Assigned to	Assigned on	Notes
VMA-331	1957	Disestablished in October 1992.

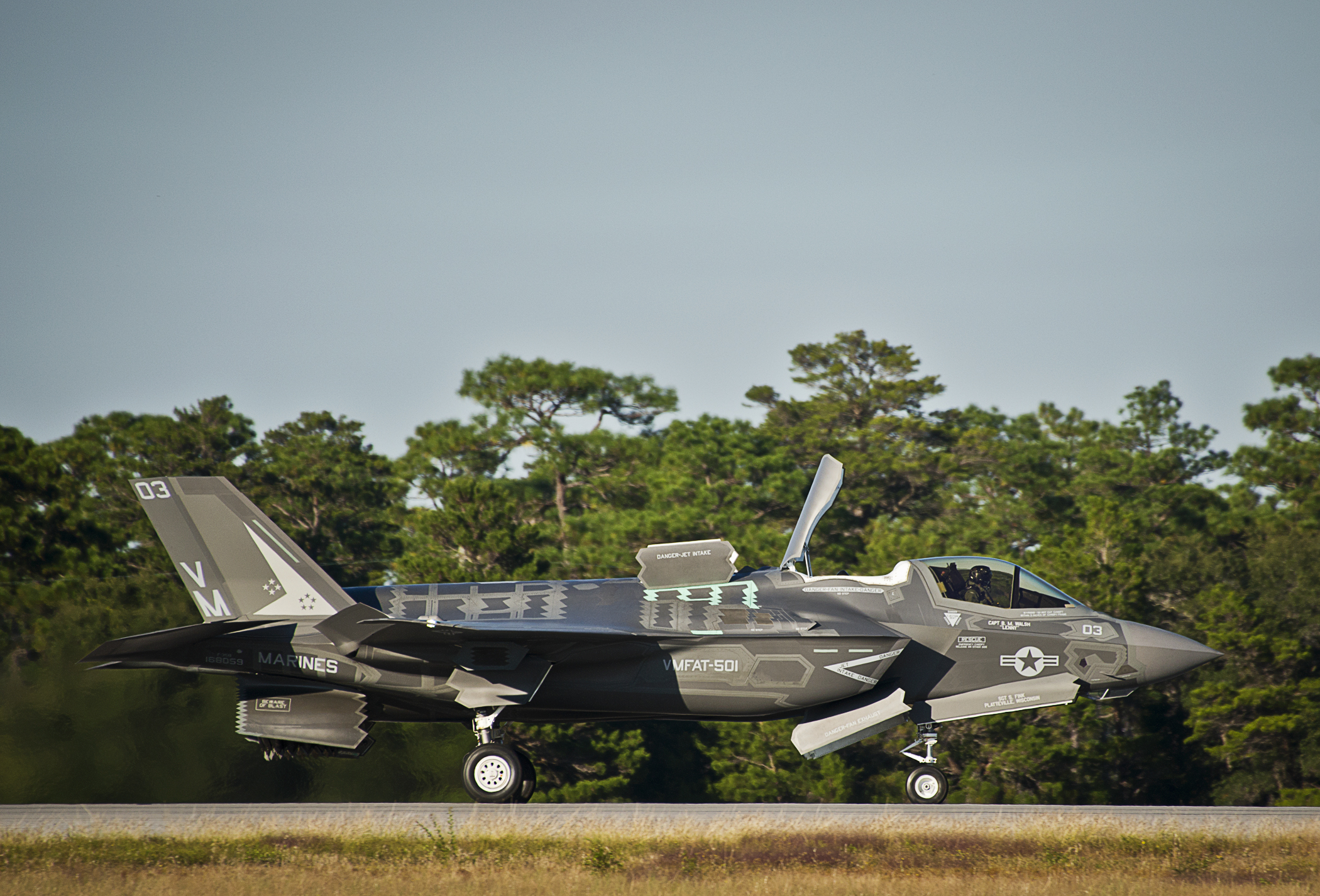
This F-35B sports the "VM" tail code of VMFAT-501.

VM

Assigned to	Assigned on	Notes
VMF-451 Subsequently, re-designated VMF(AW)-451, VMFA-451 and VMFAT-501	1957	

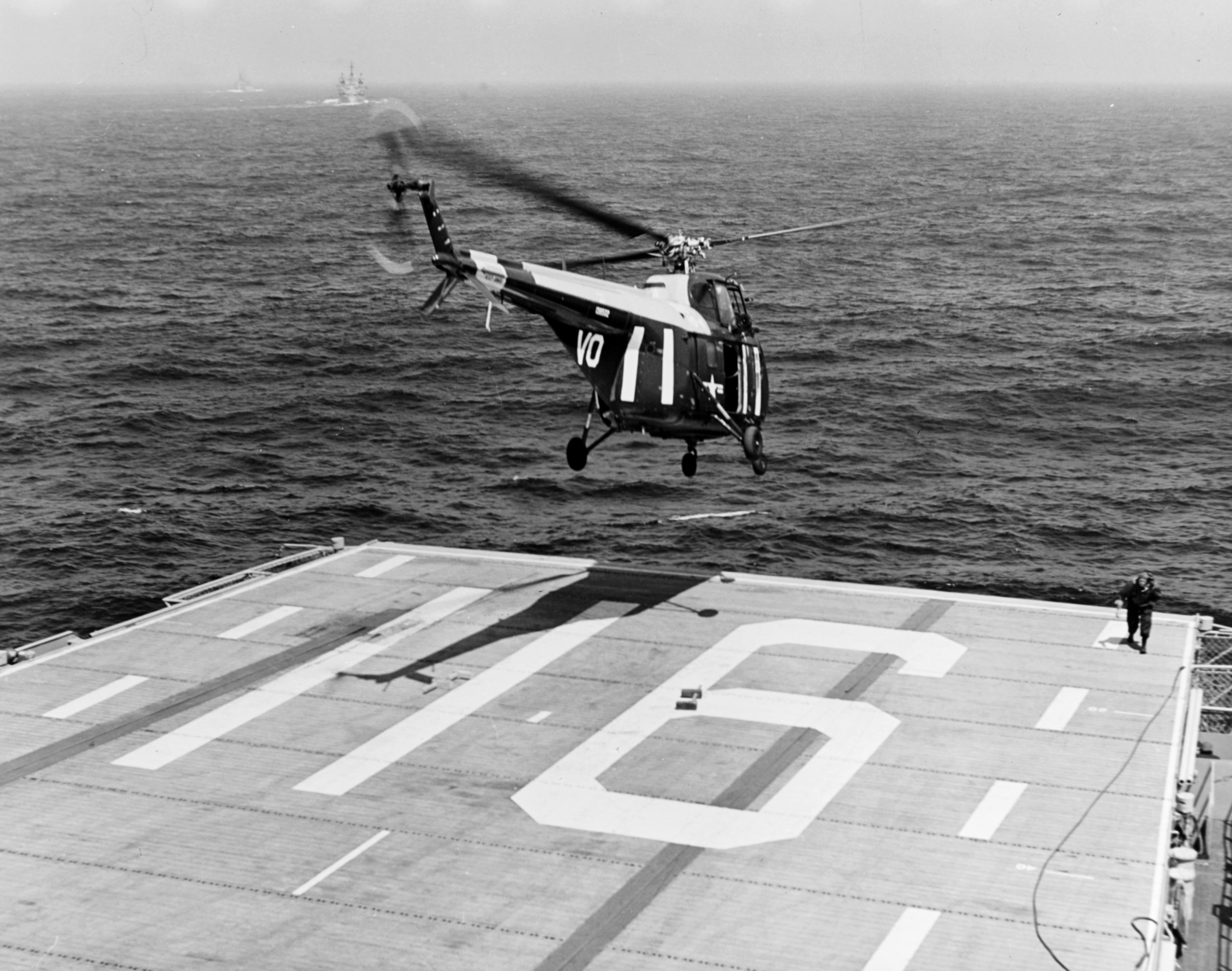
The "VO" on this HO4S helicopter indicates assignment to HS-4.

VO

Assigned to	Assigned on	Notes
HS-4	June 1952	Tail code changed to "TA" in 1957.

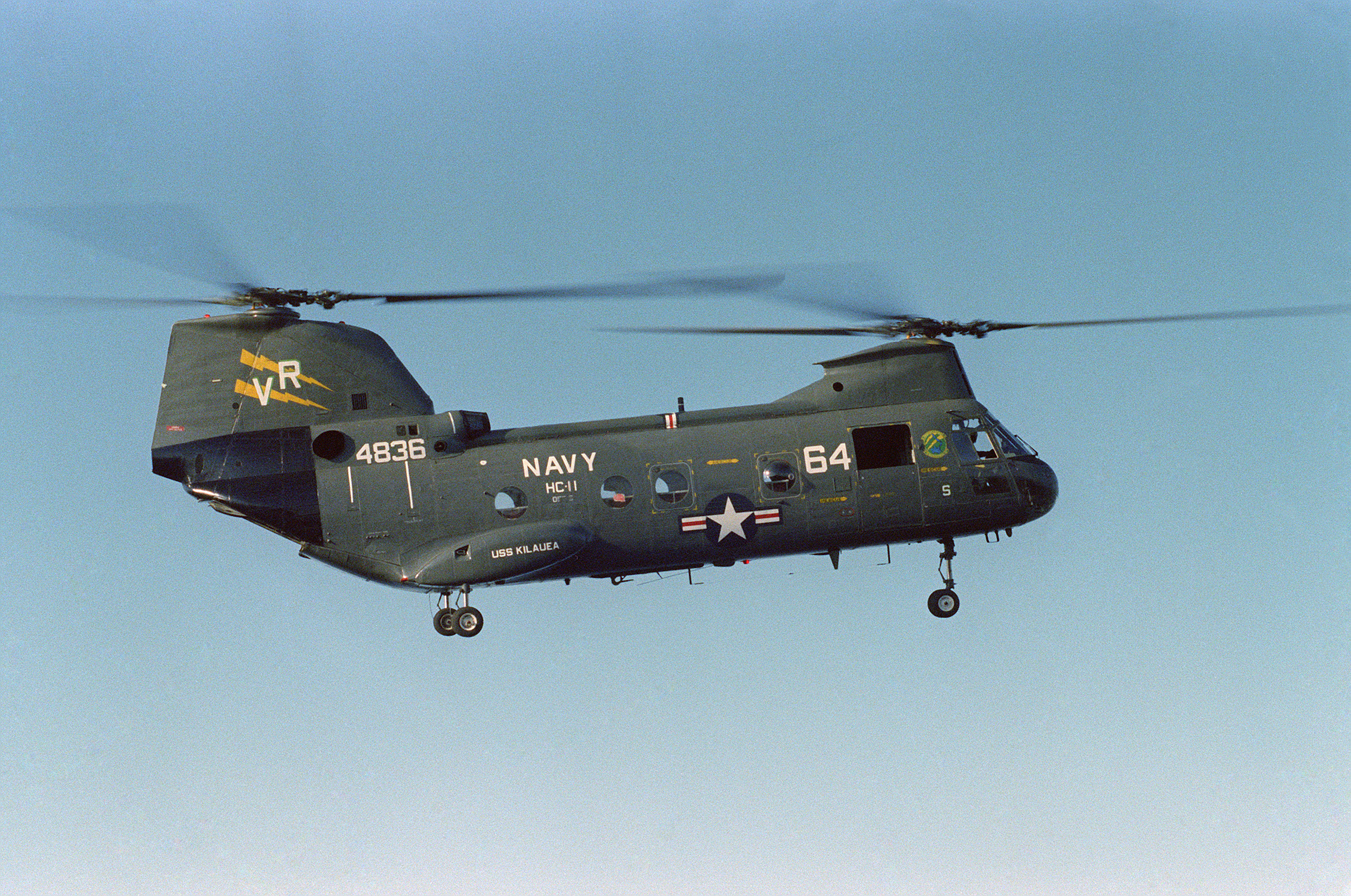
A CH-46D Sea Knight of HC-11.

VR

Assigned to	Assigned on	Notes
VAW-13	September 1959	
HC-11 Re-designated HSC-21	1977	

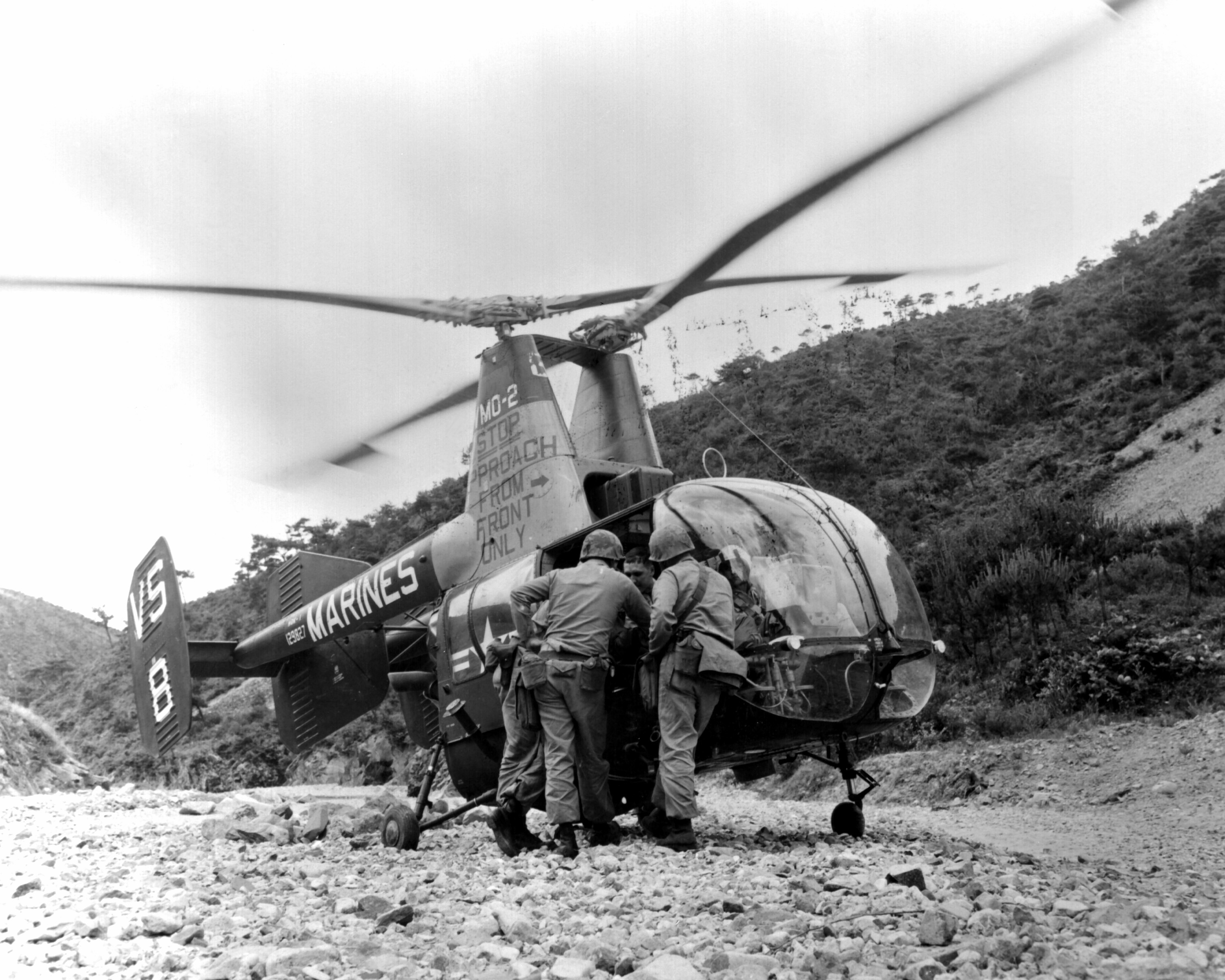
A Kaman HOK-1 Huskie of VMO-2.

VS

Assigned to	Assigned on	Notes
VMO-2	1957	Tail code changed to "UU" in 1974.

VT

Assigned to	Assigned on	Notes
HML-367 Re-designated HMLA-367	August 1966	

VV

Assigned to	Assigned on	Notes
USS Bataan (CVL-29)	8 January 1946, U.S. Navy Letter FF12-5	Only in effect until December 1946.
VA(AW)-35 Re-designated VA-122	1957	VA-122 retained the tail code of RCVW-12 ("NJ") until disestablishment in May 1991.

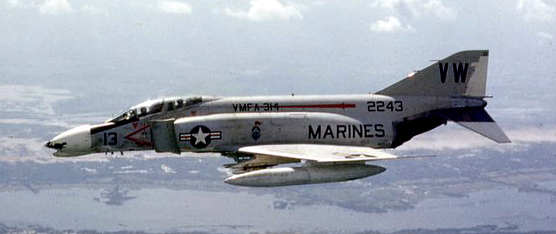
An F-4B Phantom II of VMFA-314.

VW

Assigned to	Assigned on	Notes
VMF(AW)-314 Re-designated VMFA-314	1957	

VX

Assigned to	Assigned on	Notes
HMM-561	January 1967	Disestablished in October 1969.

VZ

Assigned to	Assigned on	Notes
H&MS-56, Headquarters and Maintenance Squadron 56	Circa 1970	Disestablished in July 1971.

W

Assigned to	Assigned on	Notes
USS Antietam (CV-36)	July 1945	
USS Wright (CVL-49)	8 January 1946, U.S. Navy Letter FF12-5	
NAS Willow Grove	November 1946	Code changed to "7W" in 1956.
ATG-2, Air Task Group 2	1952	Tail code changed to "NB" in November 1956.

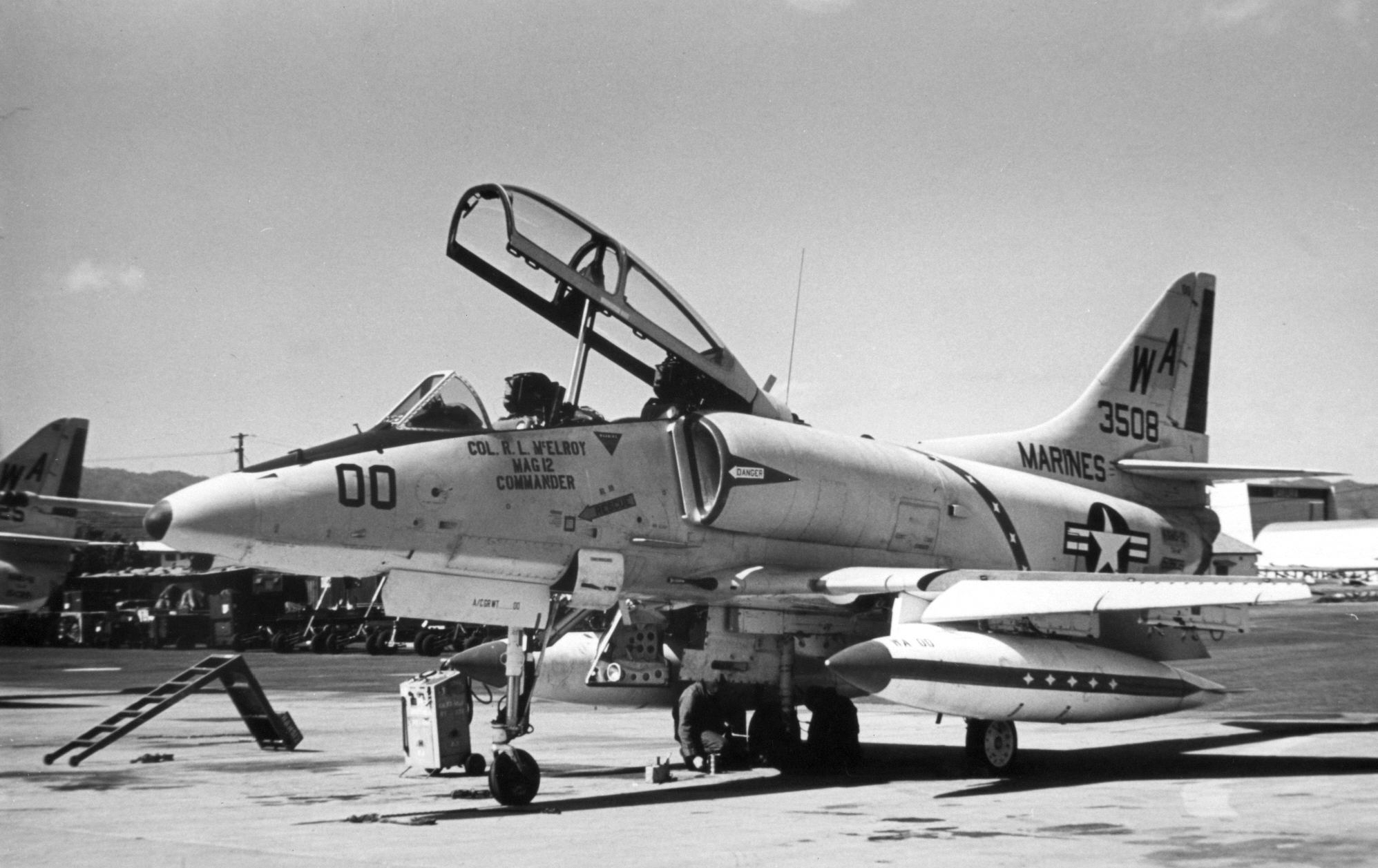
This TA-4F Skyhawk shows the "WA" code of H&MS-12.

WA

Assigned to	Assigned on	Notes
VP-MS-6	7 November 1946, U.S. Navy Letter ACL 156-46	Tail code changed to "BD" in August 1948.
HEDRON-12, Headquarters Squadron Marine Air Group 12 Re-designated H&MS-12, Headquarters and Maintenance Squadron 12	7 November 1946, U.S. Navy Letter ACL 156-46	Disestablished.

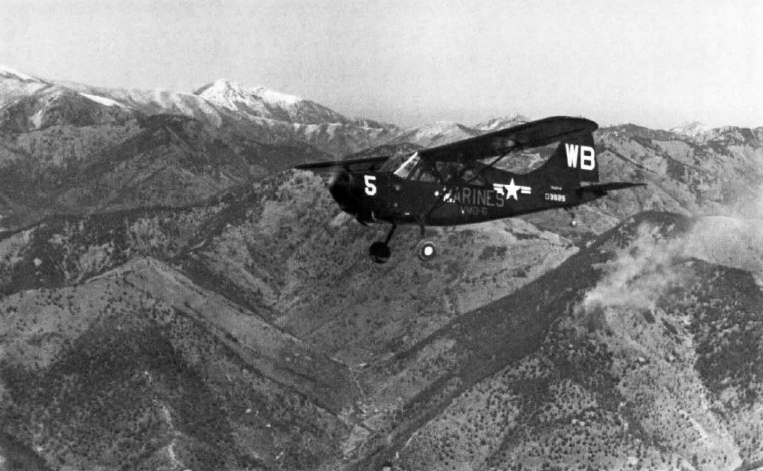
A Stinson OY-1 Sentinel of VMO-6.

WB

Assigned to	Assigned on	Notes
VP-HL-2	7 November 1946, U.S. Navy Letter ACL 156-46	
HEDRON-25, Headquarters Squadron Marine Air Group 25	7 November 1946, U.S. Navy Letter ACL 156-46	
VMO-6	4 August 1948, U.S. Navy Letter ACL 69-48	Disestablished in January 1977.

WC

Assigned to	Assigned on	Notes
VP-HL-1	7 November 1946, U.S. Navy Letter ACL 156-46	Disestablished in May 1947.
VMR-152	7 November 1946, U.S. Navy Letter ACL 156-46	Disestablished in 1959.
BTG-1, Basic Training Group 1		
HSC-23	September 2006	

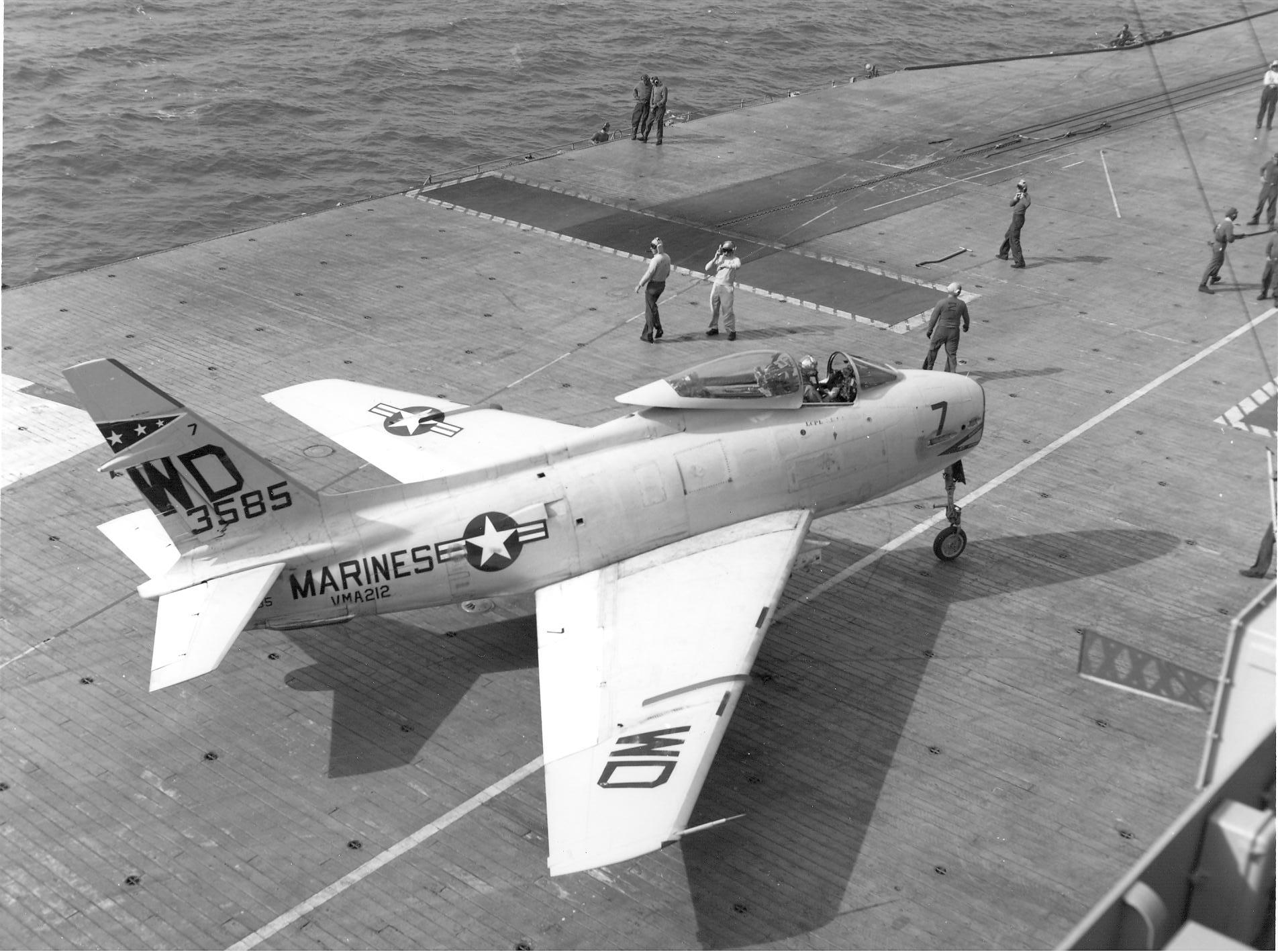
An FJ-4B Fury of VMA-212 shows its proper "WD" tail code.

WD

Assigned to	Assigned on	Notes
VPM-1	7 November 1946, U.S. Navy Letter ACL 156-46	
VMR-253	7 November 1946, U.S. Navy Letter ACL 156-46	
VMT-2	1950	
VMIT-10	December 1951	Disestablished in 1958.
VMA-212 Re-designated VMFA-212	1957	

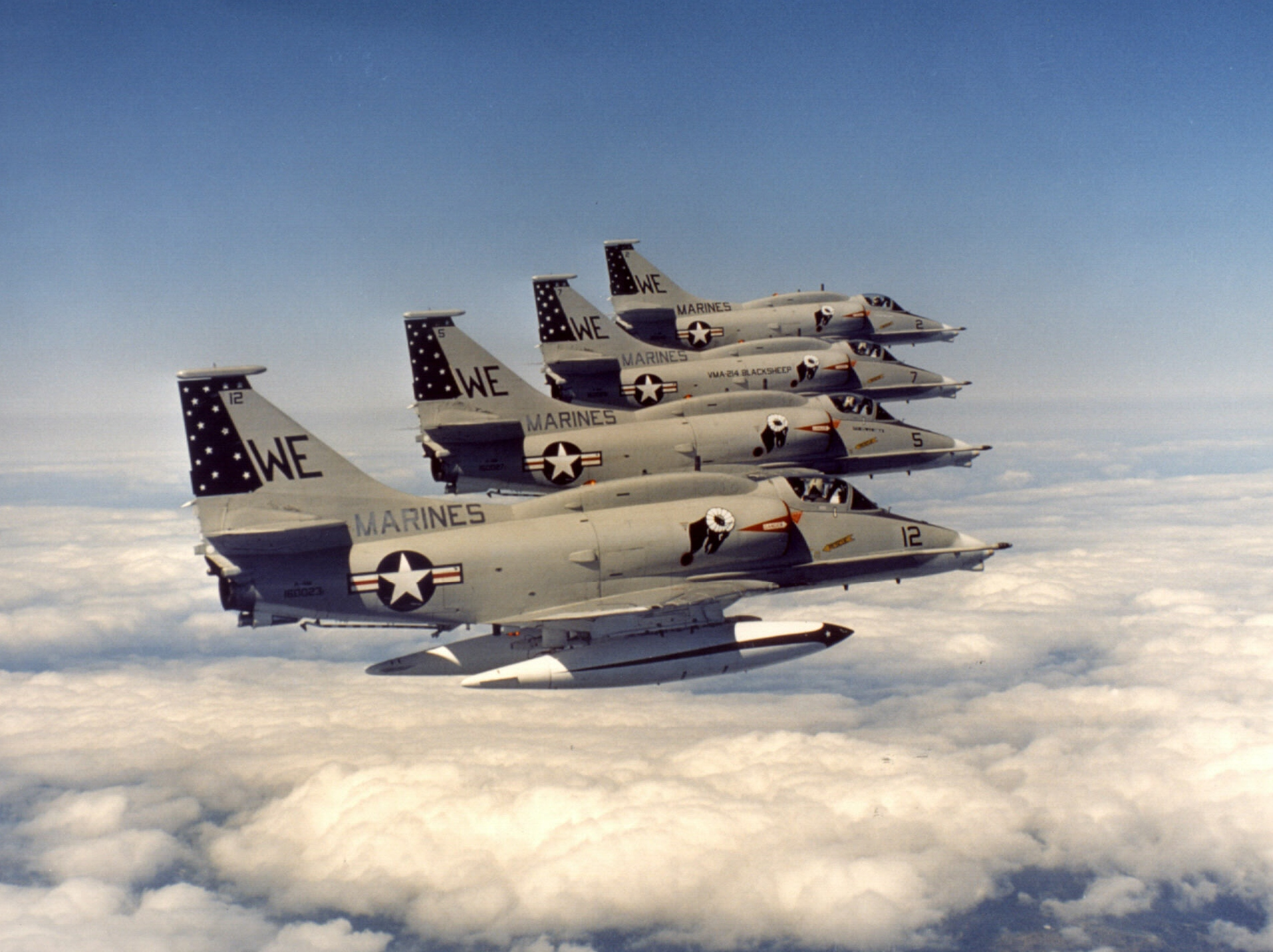
A flight of A-4 Skyhawks assigned to VMA-214.

WE

Assigned to	Assigned on	Notes
HEDRON-31, Headquarters Squadron Marine Air Group 31	7 November 1946, U.S. Navy Letter ACL 156-46	
VMF(N)-542	7 November 1946, U.S. Navy Letter ACL 156-46	
VMF-214 Re-designated VMA-214	4 August 1948, U.S. Navy Letter ACL 69-48	

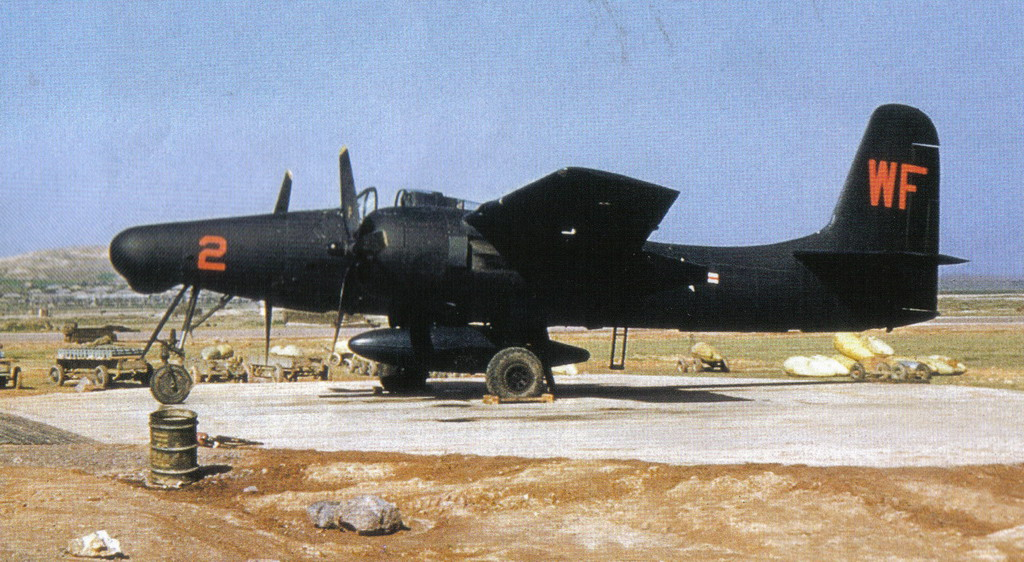
An F7F-3N Tigercat of VMF(N)-513.

WF

Assigned to	Assigned on	Notes
VMF(N)-534	7 November 1946, U.S. Navy Letter ACL 156-46	
VMF(N)-513 Subsequently, re-designated VMF(AW)-513 and VMFA-513	4 August 1948, U.S. Navy Letter ACL 69-48	Disestablished in July 2013.

WG

Assigned to	Assigned on	Notes
HMLA-773 Det.B	2009	

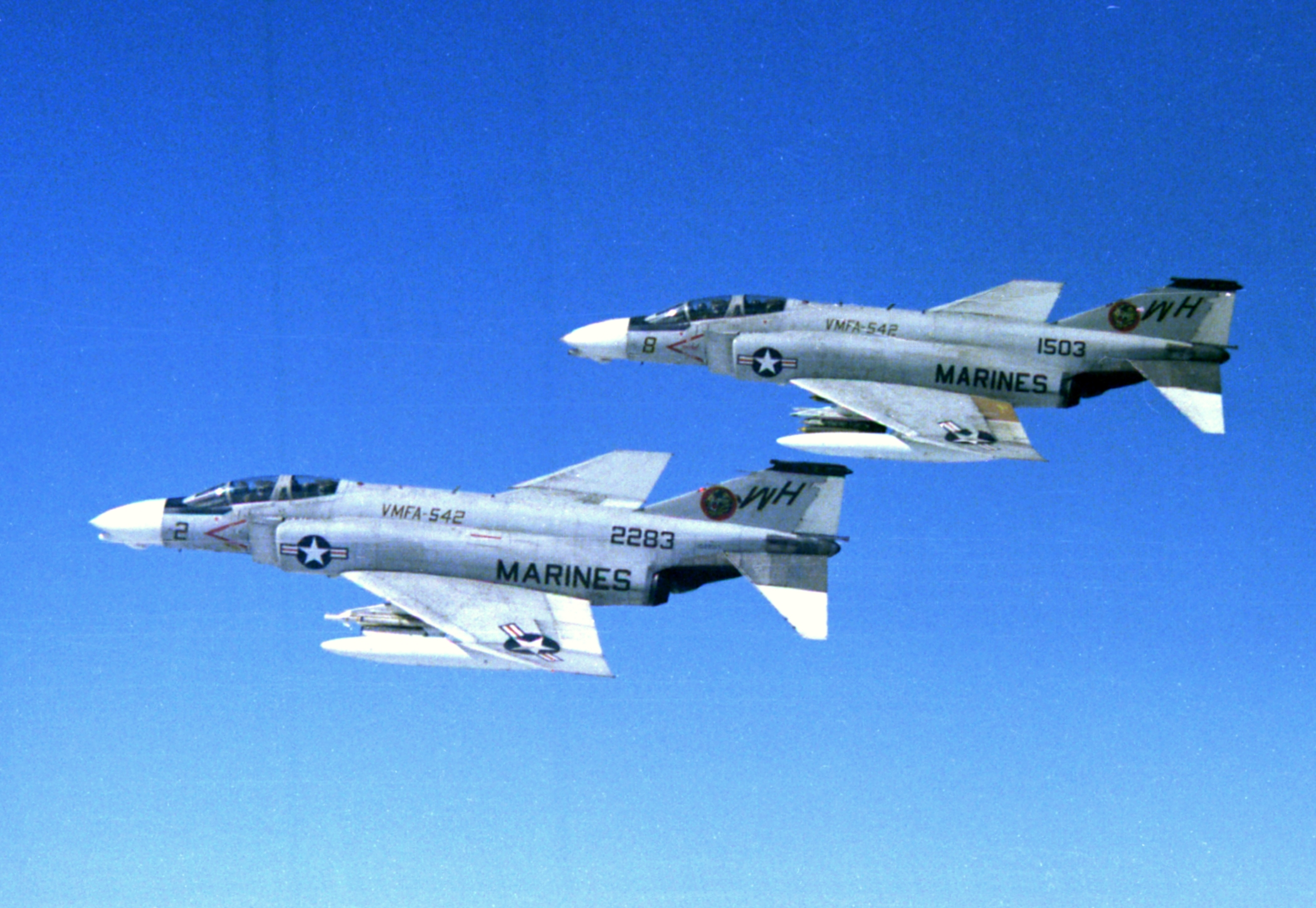
A pair of F-4B Phantom II jets of VMFA-542.

WH

Assigned to	Assigned on	Notes
VMF-542 Subsequently, re-designated VMF(N)-542, VMF(AW)-542, VMFA-542 and VMA-542	4 August 1948, U.S. Navy Letter ACL 69-48	

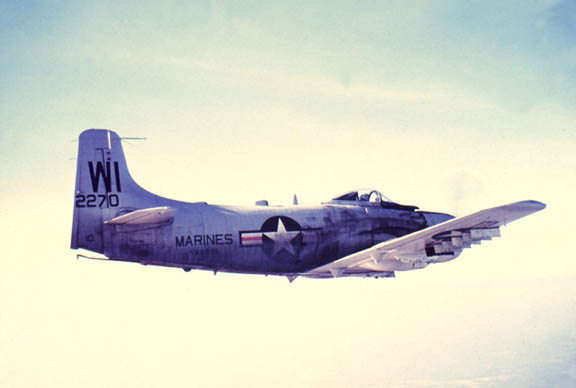
A Douglas AD-4B Skyraider assigned to VMA-225.

WI

Assigned to	Assigned on	Notes
HEDRON-32, Headquarters Squadron Marine Air Group 32	7 November 1946, U.S. Navy Letter ACL 156-46	
VMF-225 Re-designated VMA-225	4 August 1948, U.S. Navy Letter ACL 69-48	Code changed to "CE" in 1957.

WJ

Assigned to	Assigned on	Notes
JTU-1, Joint Training Unit 1	Circa 1948	Disestablished.

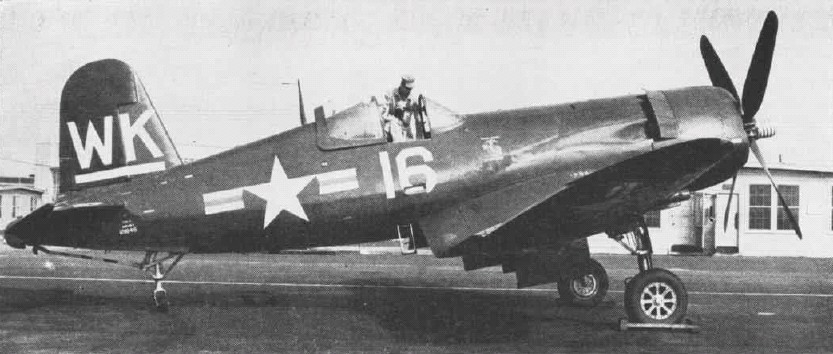
An F4U-5 Corsair of VMF-224.

WK

Assigned to	Assigned on	Notes
VMF-224 Subsequently, re-designated VMA-224 and VMA(AW)-224	7 November 1946, U.S. Navy Letter ACL 156-46	

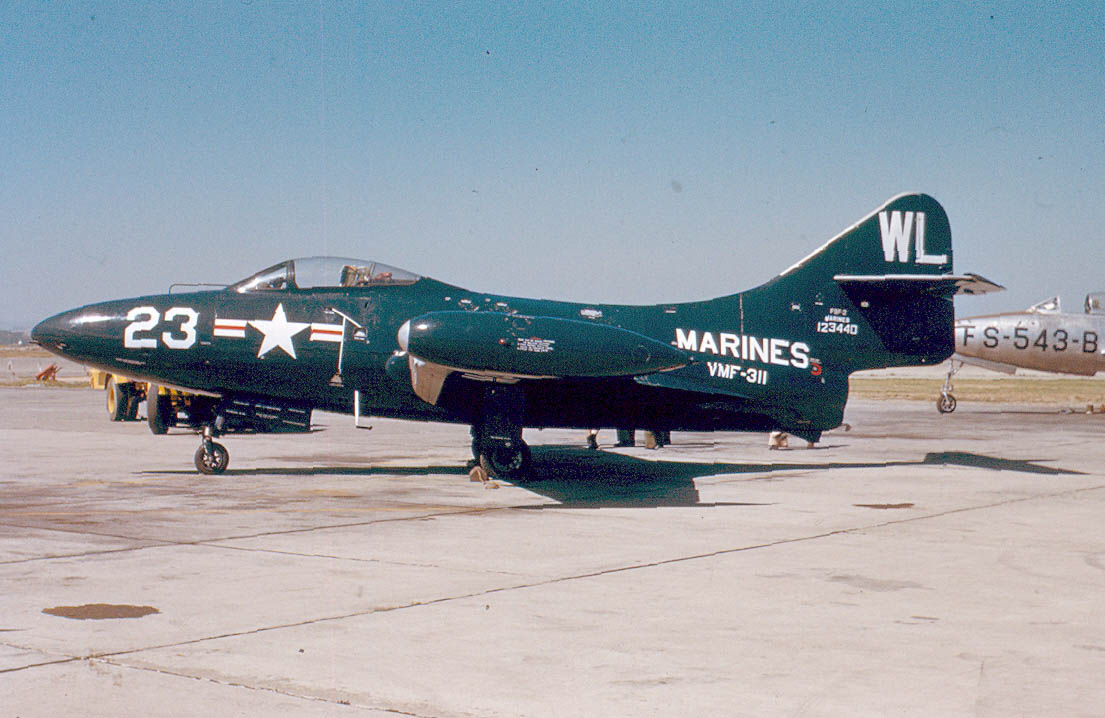
An F9F-2 Panther of VMF-311.

WL

Assigned to	Assigned on	Notes
VMF-311 Re-designated VMA-311	7 November 1946, U.S. Navy Letter ACL 156-46	

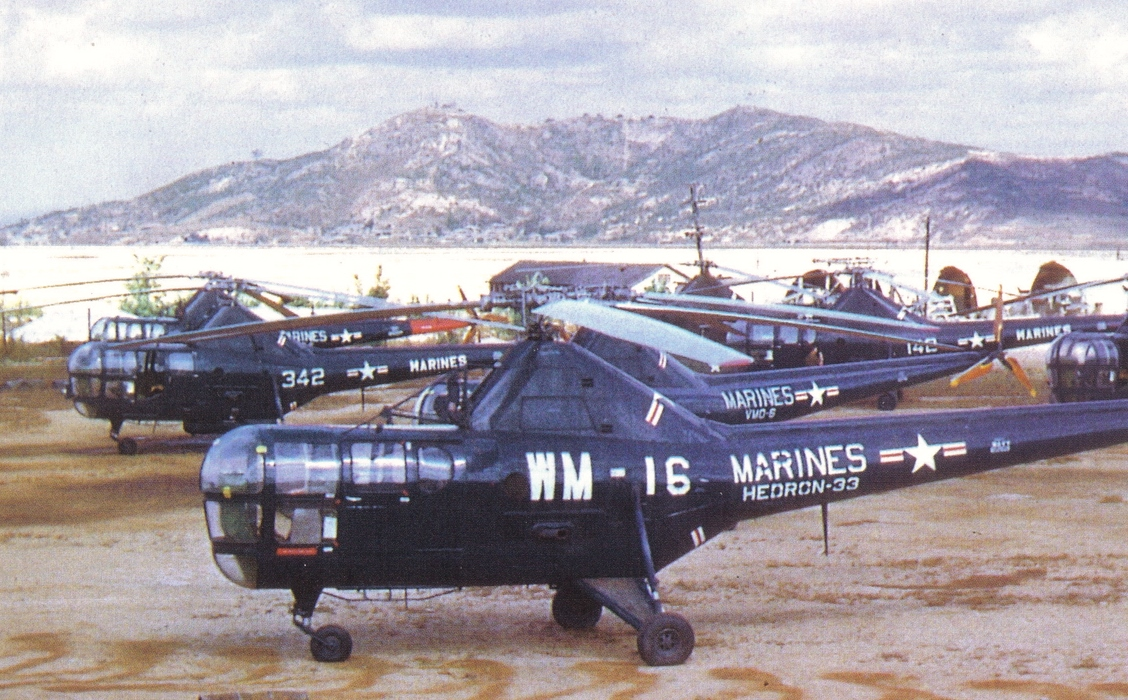
The "WM" code on this HO3S-1 helicopter indicates assignment to the Headquarters Squadron 33.

WM

Assigned to	Assigned on	Notes
HEDRON-33, Headquarters Squadron Marine Air Group 33 Re-designated H&MS-33, Headquarters and Maintenance Squadron 33	7 November 1946, U.S. Navy Letter ACL 156-46	Disestablished in December 1970.

WP

Assigned to	Assigned on	Notes
VMF-223 Re-designated VMA-223	7 November 1946, U.S. Navy Letter ACL 156-46	

WQ

Assigned to	Assigned on	Notes
VQ-2	September 1955	Tail code changed to "JQ" before the end of the decade.

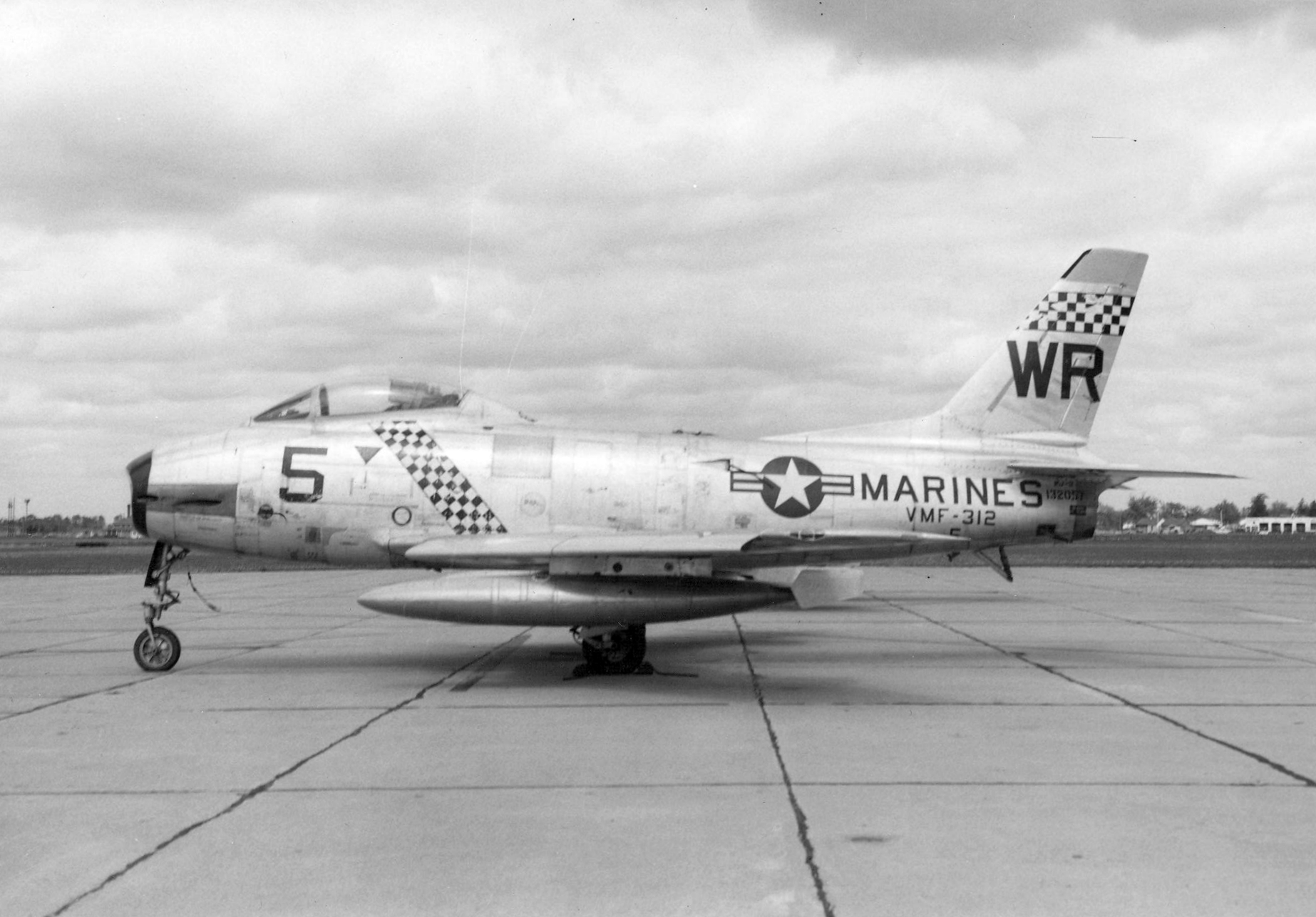
An FJ-2 Fury of VMF-312.

WR

Assigned to	Assigned on	Notes
VMF-312	7 November 1946, U.S. Navy Letter ACL 156-46	
HMLA-775	September 1958	Disestablished in September 2008.

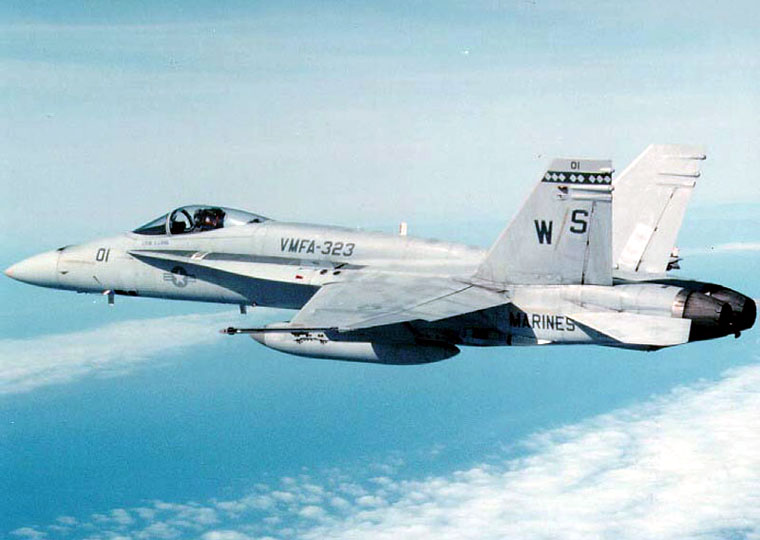
An F/A-18 Hornet of VMFA-323.

WS

Assigned to	Assigned on	Notes
VMF-323 Subsequently, re-designated VMF(AW)-323 and VMFA-323	7 November 1946, U.S. Navy Letter ACL 156-46	

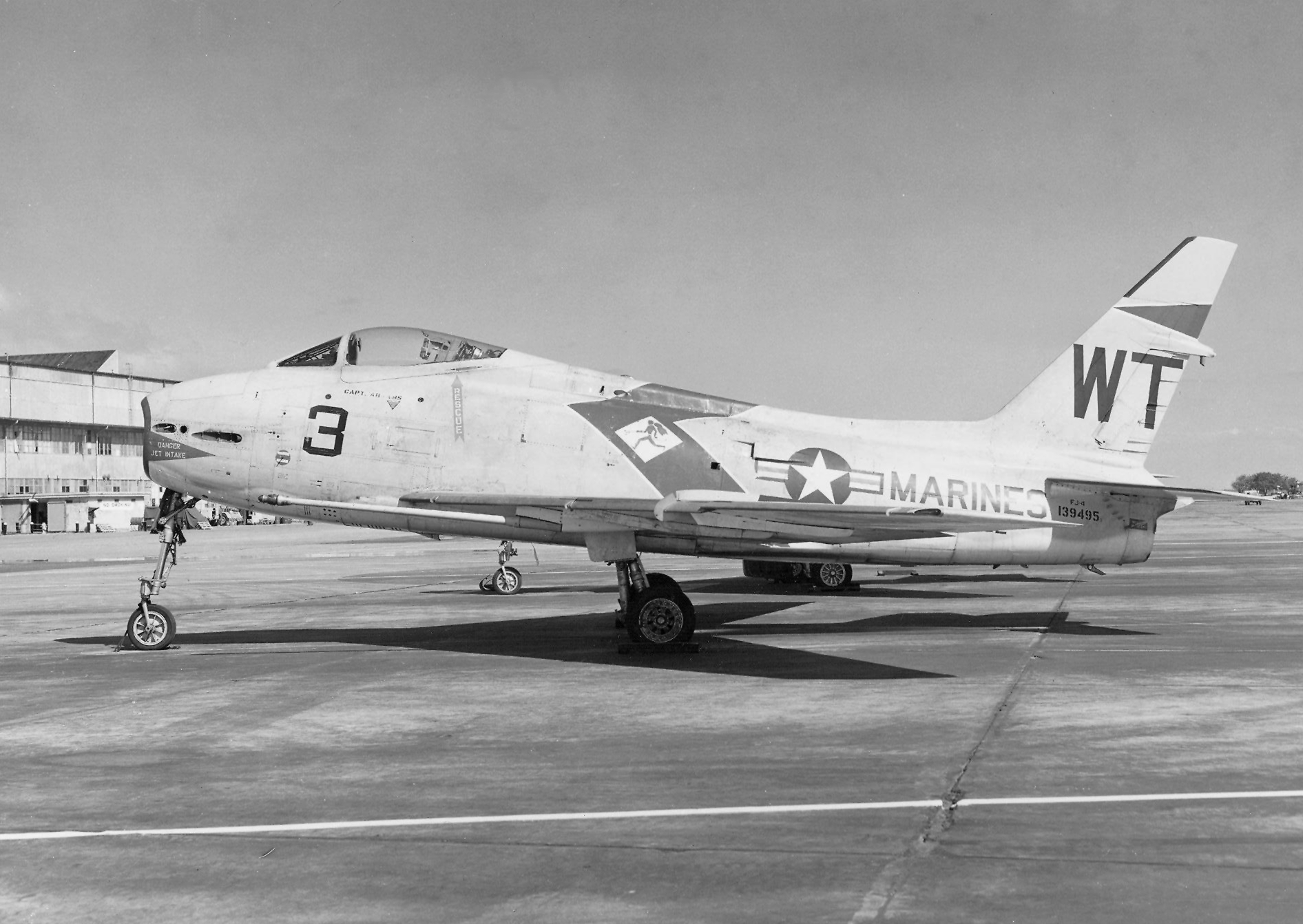
An FJ-4 Fury of VMF-232.

WT

Assigned to	Assigned on	Notes
VMP-254	7 November 1946, U.S. Navy Letter ACL 156-46	
VMF-232 Re-designated VMFA-232	1957	

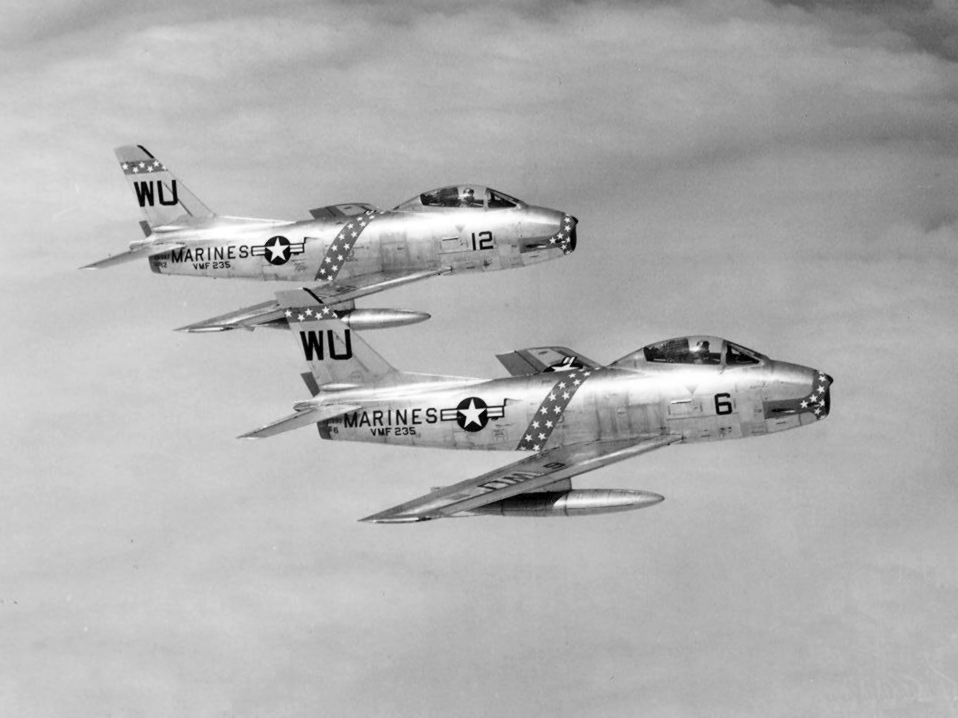
A pair of brightly decorated FJ-2 Fury fighters assigned to VMF-235.

WU

Assigned to	Assigned on	Notes
VMF-235		
VMF-334 Re-designated VMFA-334	1957	Disestablished in December 1971.

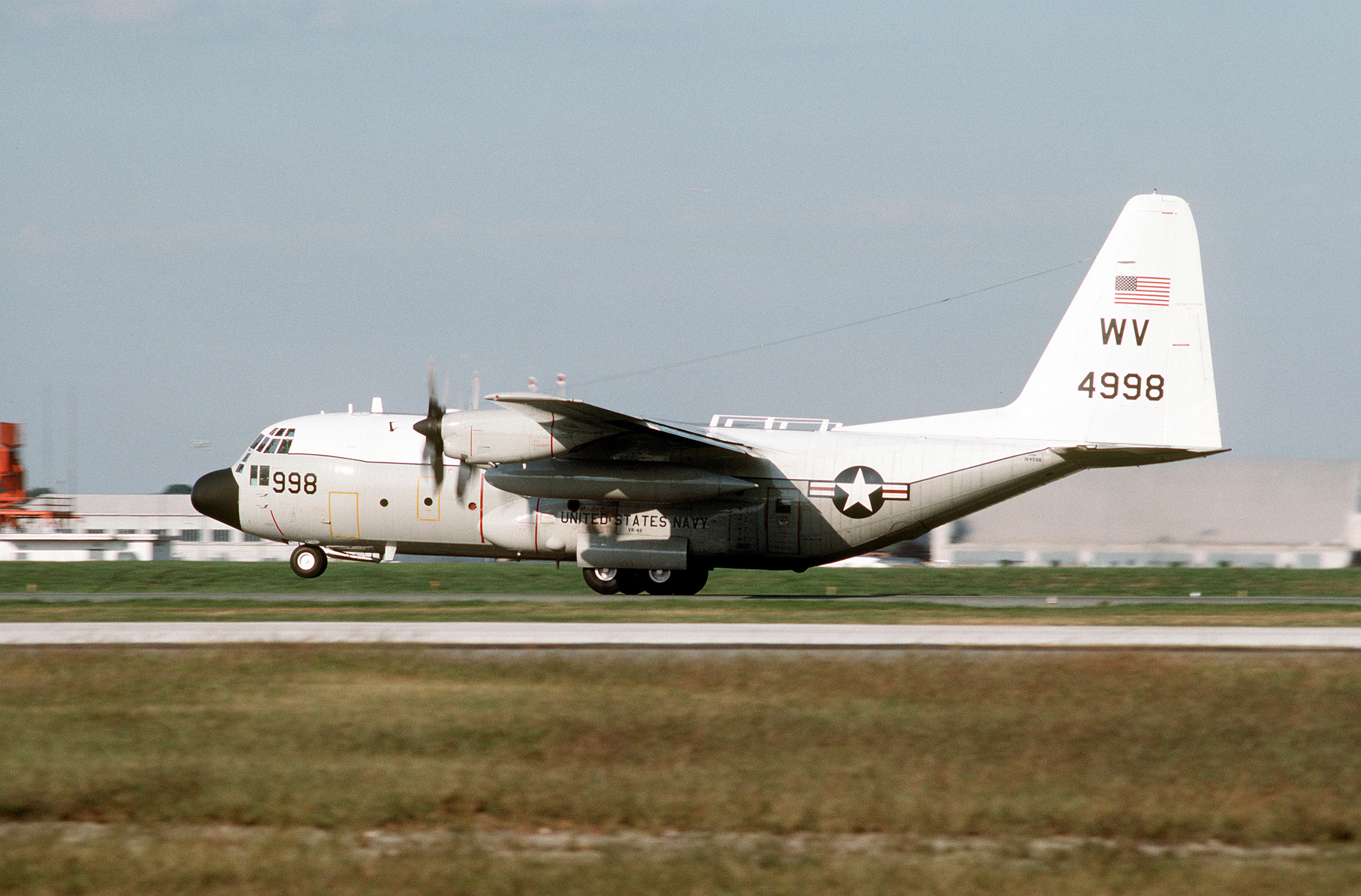
A C-130T Hercules of VR-48.

WV

Assigned to	Assigned on	Notes
VR-53	1999	Code changed to "AX" in 2004.

WW

Assigned to	Assigned on	Notes
HEDRON-16, Headquarters Squadron Marine Air Group 16 Re-designated H&MS-16, Headquarters and Maintenance Squadron 16	March 1951	Disestablished.

WX

Assigned to	Assigned on	Notes
HEDRON-36, Headquarters Squadron Marine Air Group 36 Re-designated H&MS-36, Headquarters and Maintenance Squadron 36	June 1952	Disestablished.

WZ

Assigned to	Assigned on	Notes
AIRFMFPAC, Headquarters Squadron Aircraft Fleet Marine Force Pacific	4 August 1948, U.S. Navy Letter ACL 69-48	Disestablished.

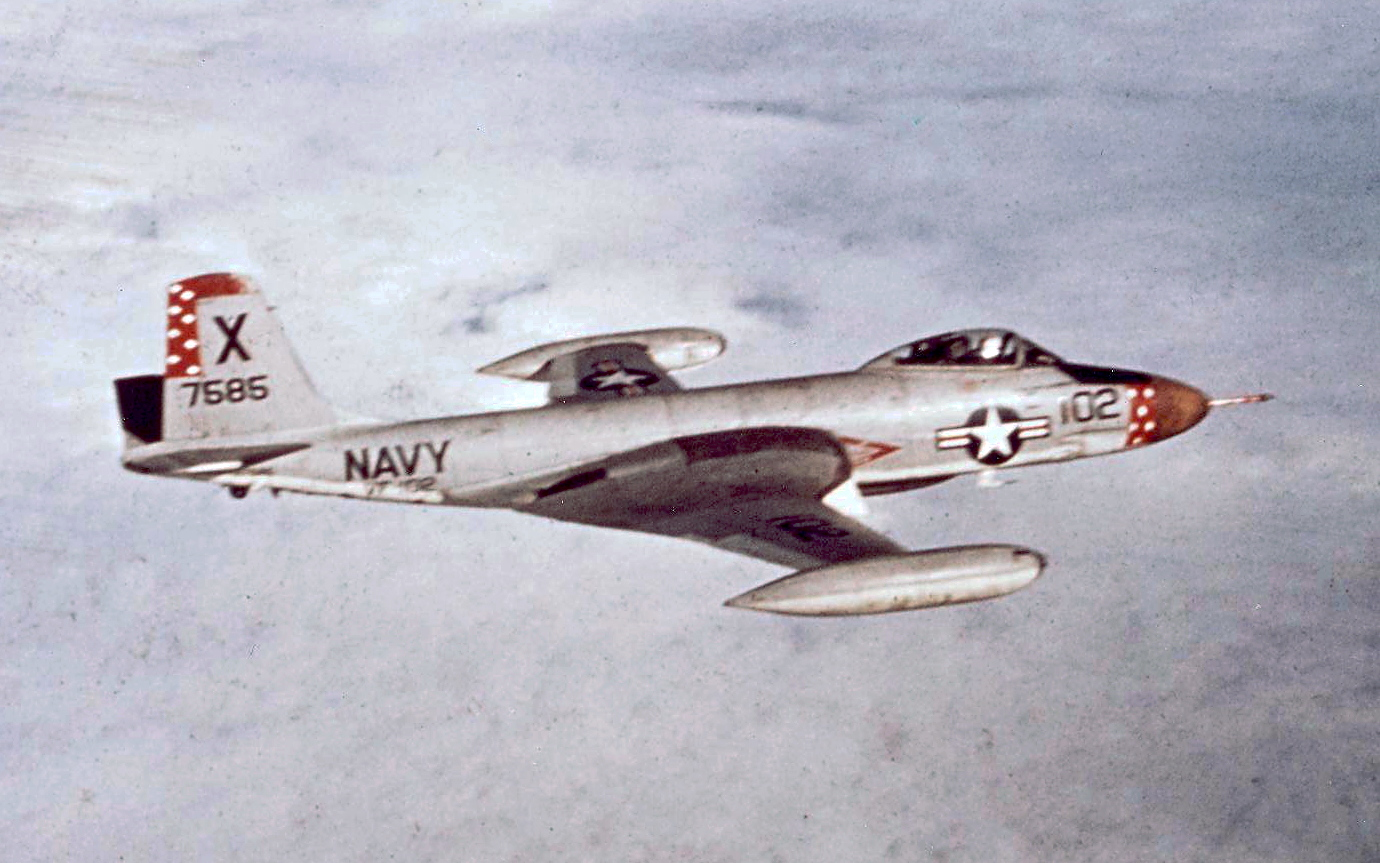
The "X" on this F2H-4 Banshee indicates assignment to Air Task Group 202.

X

Assigned to	Assigned on	Notes
USS Wasp (CV-18)	July 1945	
USS Shangri La (CV-38)	8 January 1946, U.S. Navy Letter FF12-5	
NAS New Orleans	November 1946	Code changed to "7X" in 1956.
ATG-202, Air Task Group 202	1955	Code changed to "AQ" in November 1956.

XA

Assigned to	Assigned on	Notes
VX-1	7 November 1946, U.S. Navy Letter ACL 156-46	Code changed to "JA" in 1957.

XB

Assigned to	Assigned on	Notes
VX-2	7 November 1946, U.S. Navy Letter ACL 156-46	Code changed to "JB" in 1957.

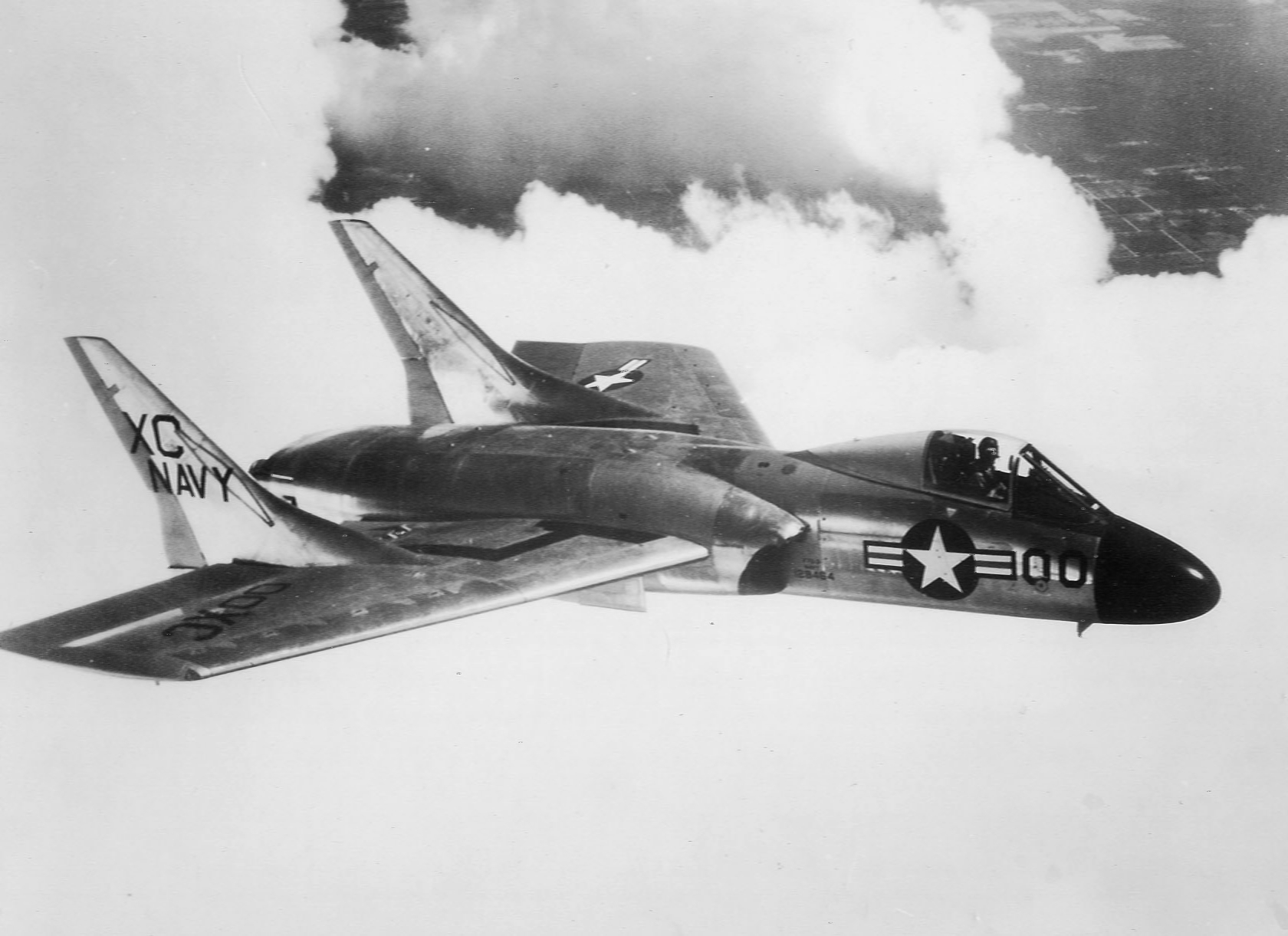
An F7U-3 Cutlass of VX-3.

XC

Assigned to	Assigned on	Notes
VX-3	July 1946	Tail code changed to "JC" in 1957.

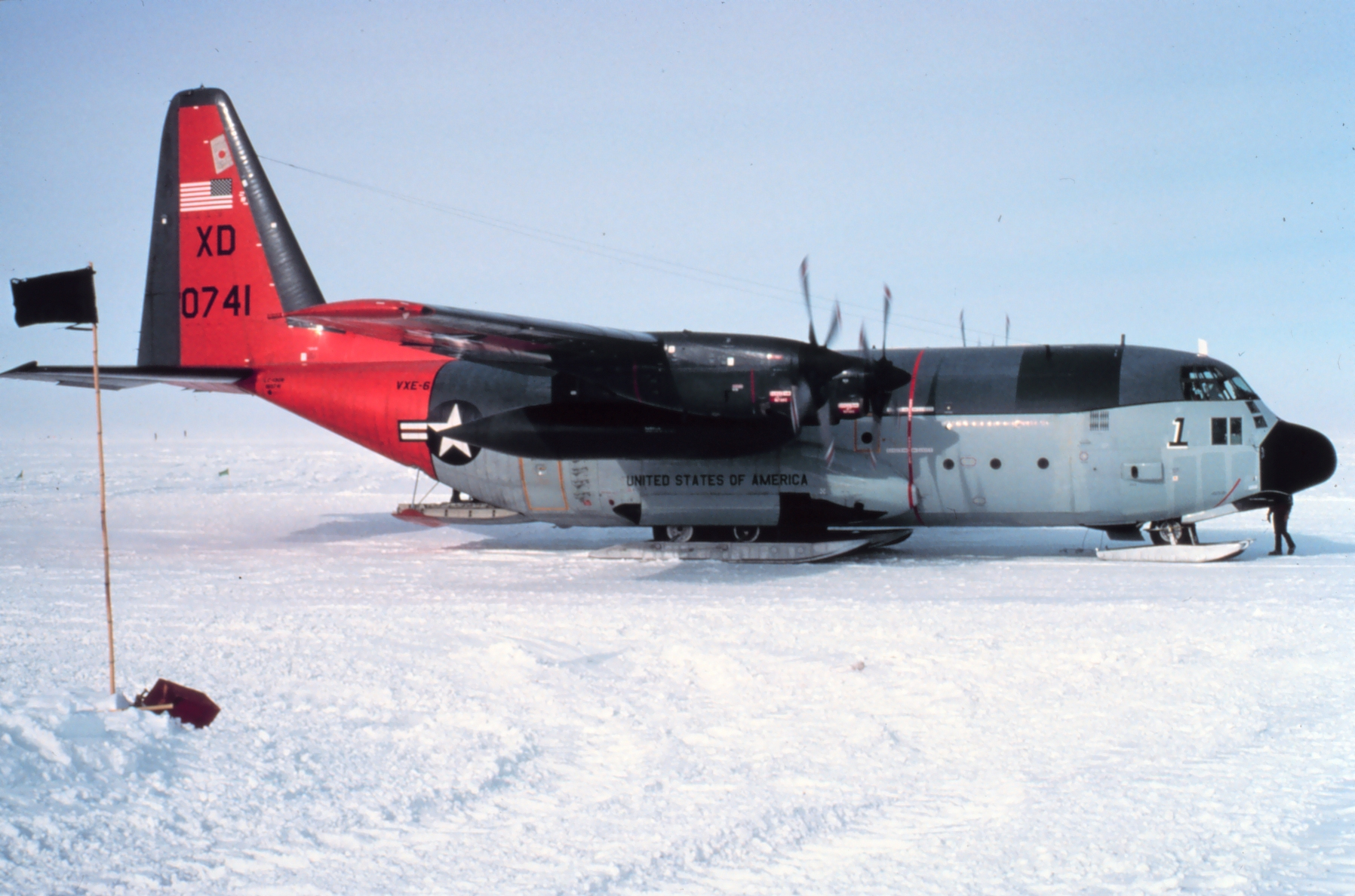
An LC-130R Hercules of VXE-6.

XD

Assigned to	Assigned on	Notes
VX-6 Re-designated VXE-6, Antarctic Deployment Squadron 6	7 November 1946, U.S. Navy Letter ACL 156-46	Code changed to "JD" in 1957, then reverted to "XD". Disestablished in March 1999.

XE

Assigned to	Assigned on	Notes
VX-5	June 1951	Disestablished in April 1994.
VX-9	June 1993	

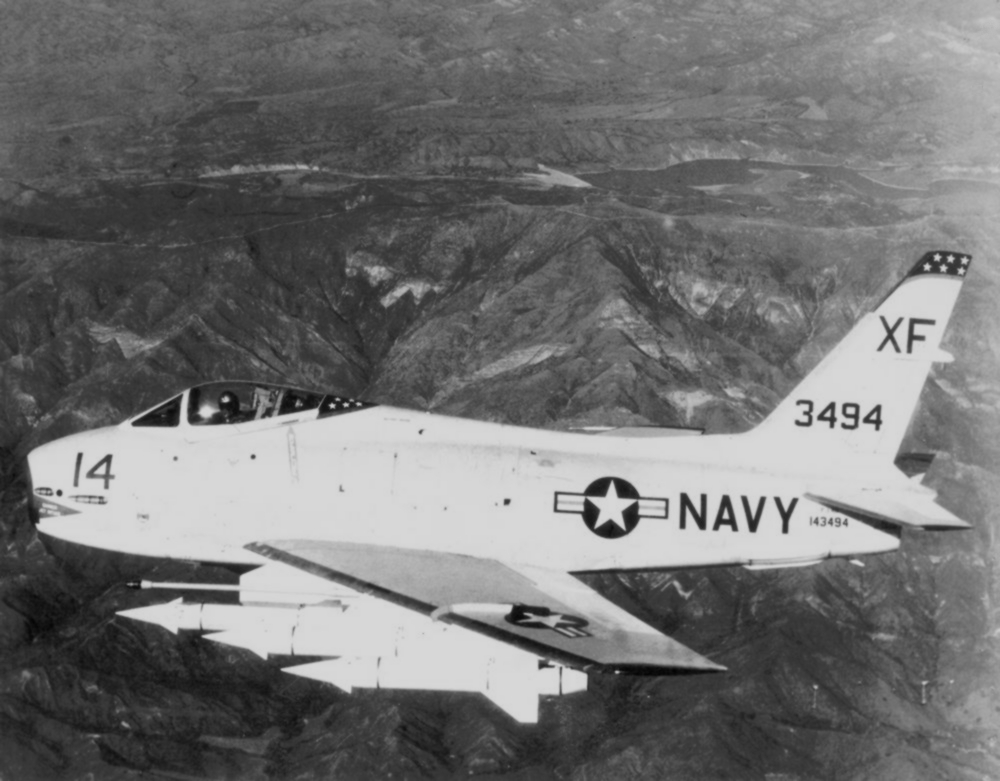
An FJ-4B Fury of VX-4.

XF

Assigned to	Assigned on	Notes
VX-4	1950	Disestablished in September 1994.

XM

Assigned to	Assigned on	Notes
HMX-1	December 1947	Code changed to "MX" in 1958.

XX

Assigned to	Assigned on	Notes
USS Wasp (CV-18)	8 January 1946, U.S. Navy Letter FF12-5	Only in effect until December 1946.

Y

Assigned to	Assigned on	Notes
USS Bunker Hill (CV-17)	July 1945	
USS Yorktown (CV-10)	8 January 1946, U.S. Navy Letter FF12-5	Only in effect until December 1946.
ATG-3, Air Task Group 3	1955	Code changed to "NC" in November 1956.

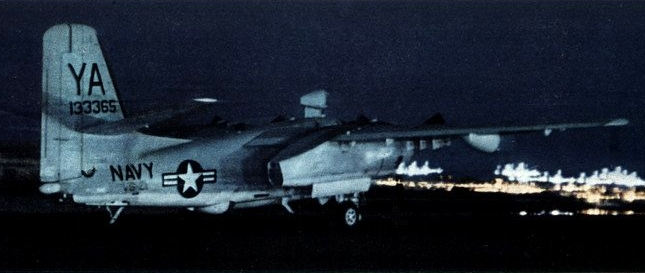
The tail code of this Grumman Tracker indicates assignment to VS-21.

YA

Assigned to	Assigned on	Notes
VS-21	1957	Disestablished.

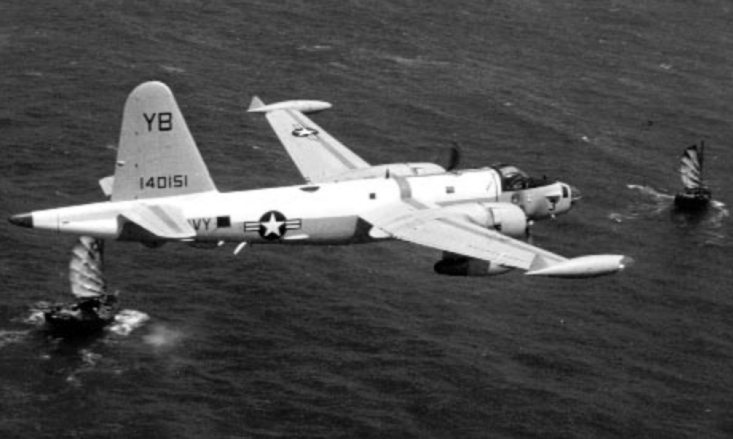
An SP-2H Neptune of VP-1.

YB

Assigned to	Assigned on	Notes
VP-1	1957	

YC

Assigned to	Assigned on	Notes
VP-2	1957	Disestablished in September 1969.

YD

Assigned to	Assigned on	Notes
VP-4	1957	

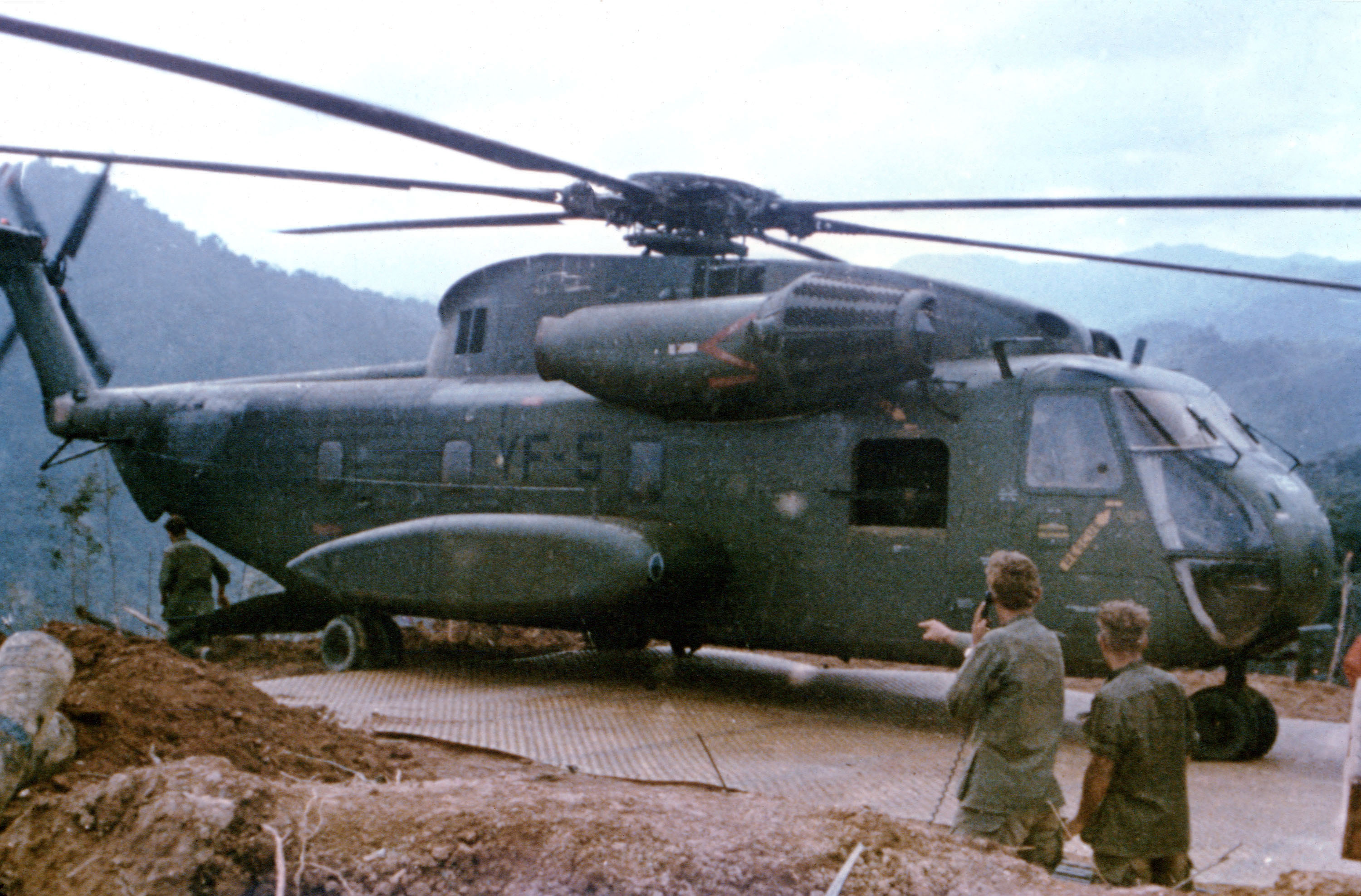
The squadron's code is barely visible on this war-weary CH-53A Stallion of HMH-462.

YF

Assigned to	Assigned on	Notes
HMH-462	November 1957	

YG

Assigned to	Assigned on	Notes
HMR(M)-463	1957	Disestablished in June 1959.

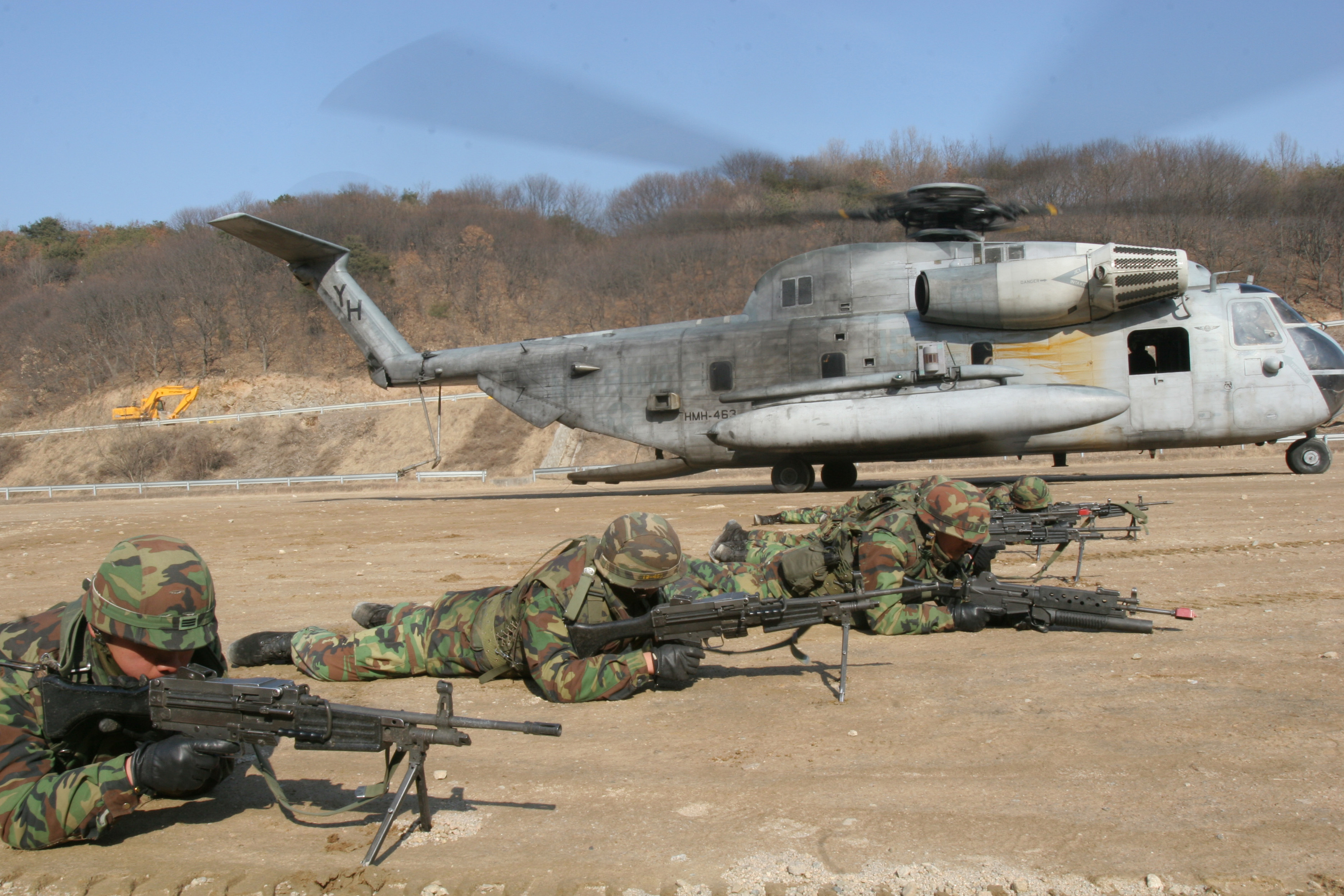
A CH-53D Stallion of HMH-463.

YH

Assigned to	Assigned on	Notes
HMH-463	September 1958	

YJ

Assigned to	Assigned on	Notes
HMH-465	December 1981	

YK

Assigned to	Assigned on	Notes
HMM-364	September 1961	
HMH-466	November 1984	

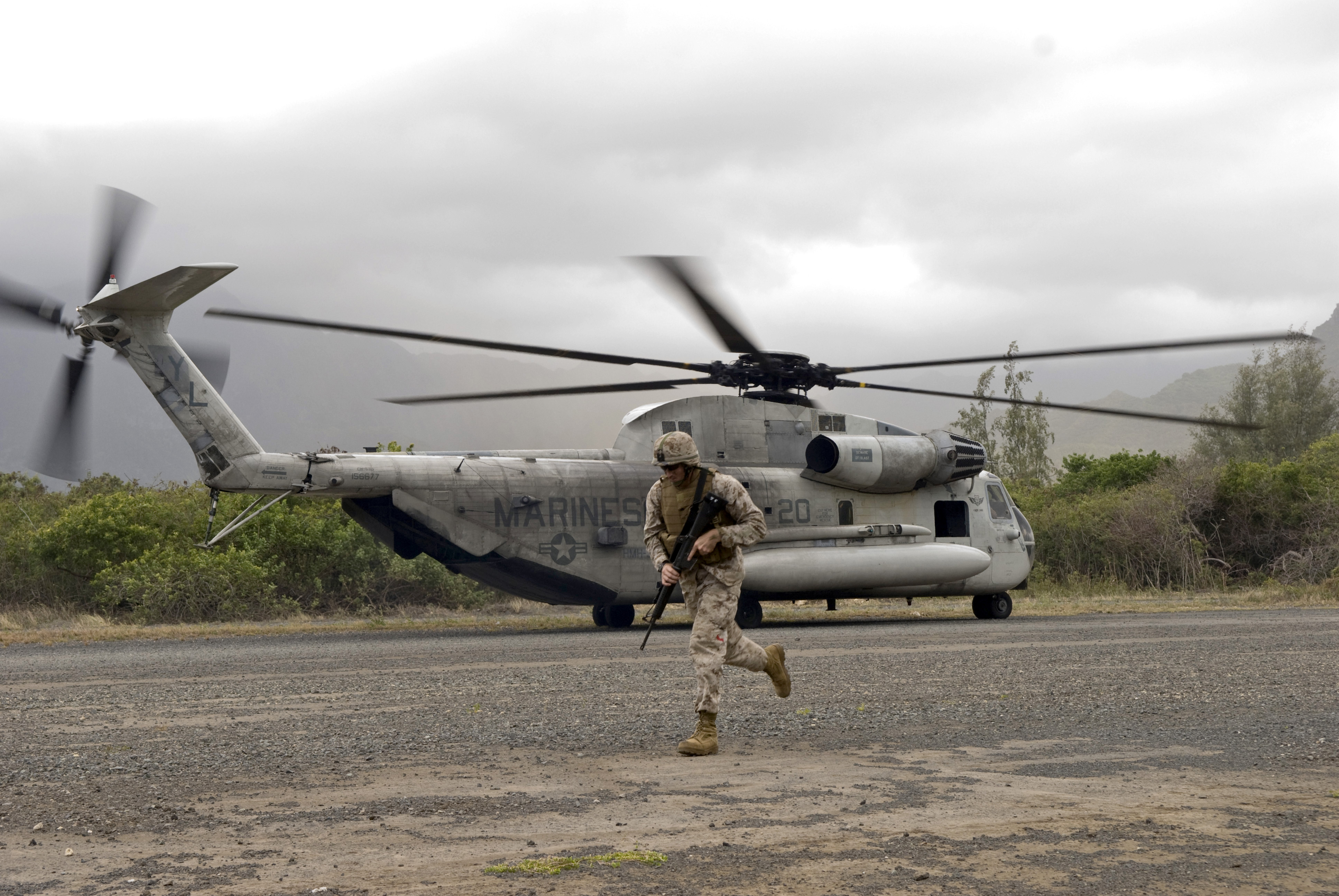
A CH-53D Stallion of HMH-362.

YL

Assigned to	Assigned on	Notes
HMR(L)-362 Subsequently, re-designated HMM-362 and HMH-362	1957	

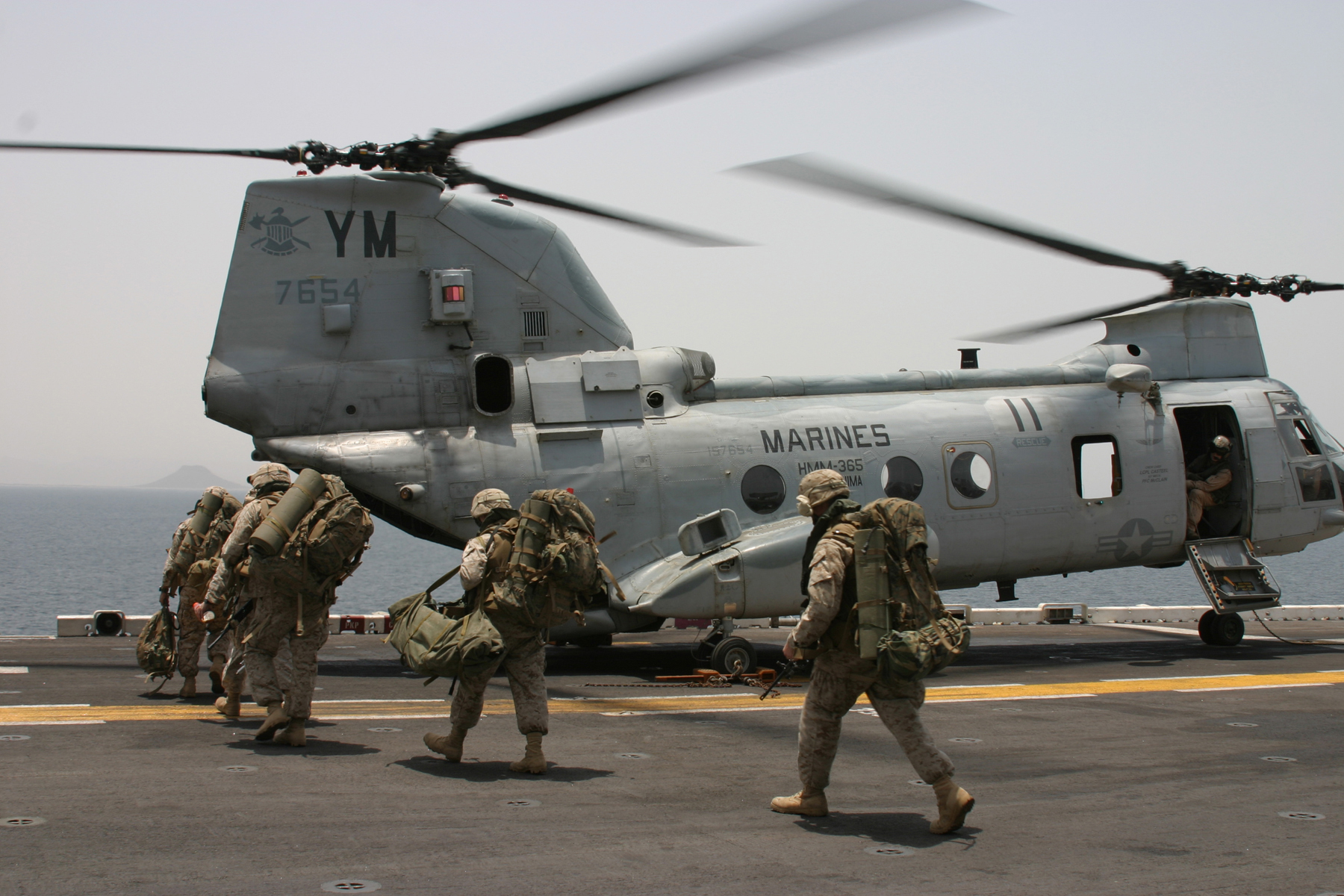
A CH-46F Sea Knight assigned to HMM-365.

YM

Assigned to	Assigned on	Notes
HMM-365 Re-designated VMM-365	July 1963	

YN

Assigned to	Assigned on	Notes
HMR(L)-361 Re-designated HMH-361	1957	

YP

Assigned to	Assigned on	Notes
HMR(L)-163 Subsequently, re-designated HMM-163 and VMM-163	1957	

YQ

Assigned to	Assigned on	Notes
HMM-268 Subsequently, re-designated VMM-268	March 1979	

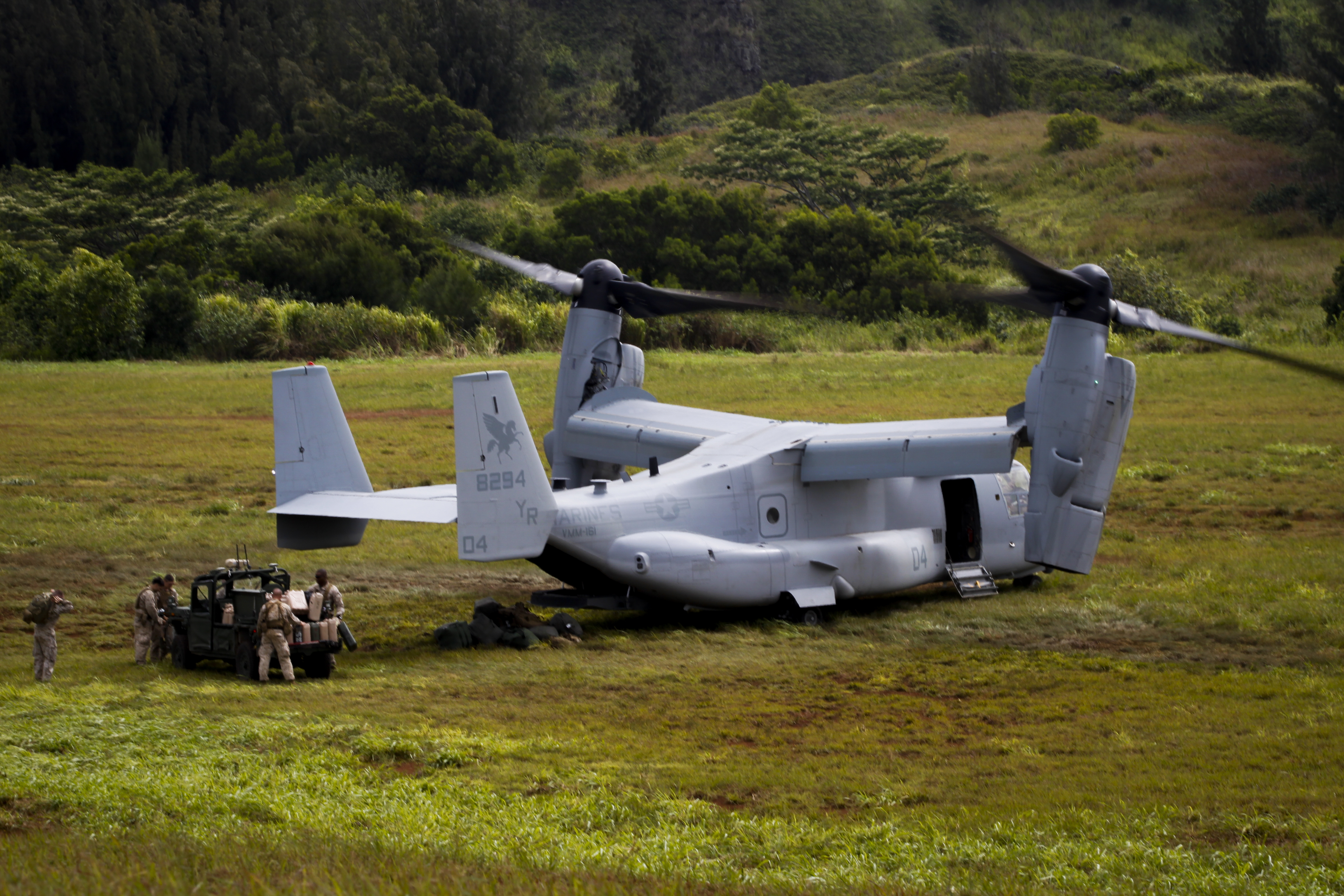
An MV-22B Osprey of VMM-161.

YR

Assigned to	Assigned on	Notes
HMR(L)-161 Subsequently, re-designated HMM-161 and VMM-161	1957	

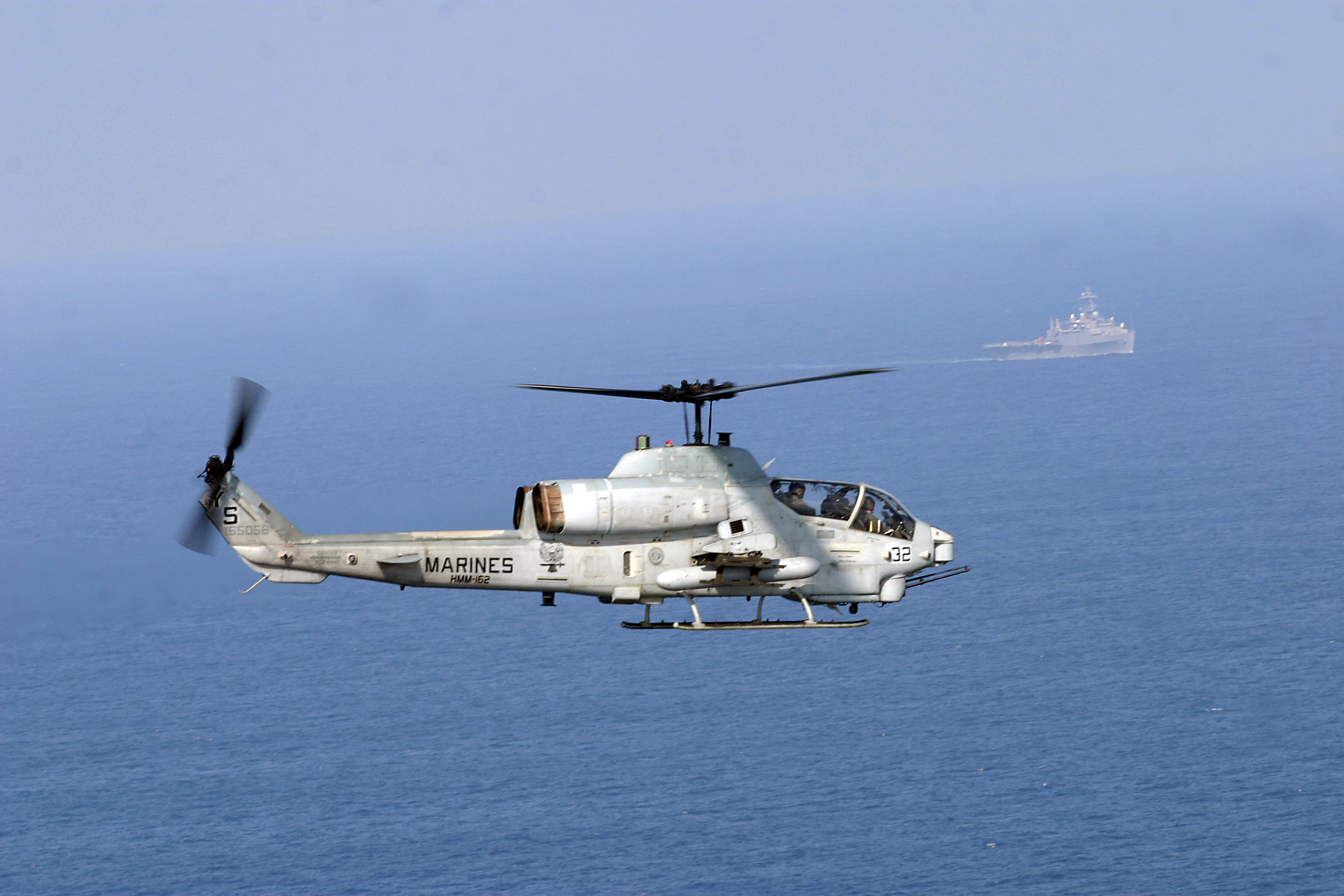
The tail code of this AH-1W Super Cobra attack helicopter indicates assignment to HMM-162.

YS

Assigned to	Assigned on	Notes
HMR(L)-162 Subsequently, re-designated HMM-162 and VMM-162	1957	

YT

Assigned to	Assigned on	Notes
HMM-164 Re-designated VMM-164	July 1962	

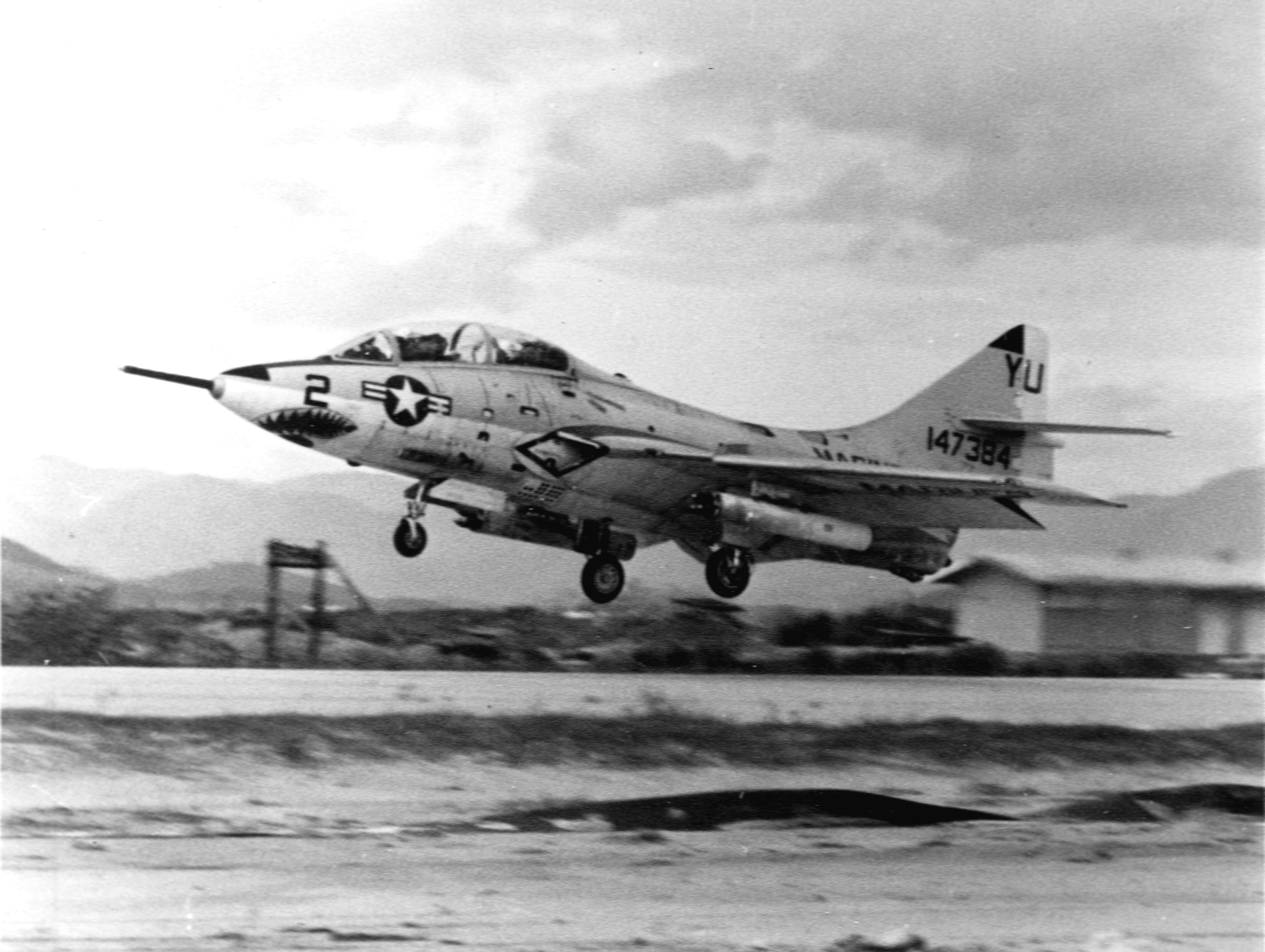
A TF-9J Cougar of Headquarters and Maintenance Squadron 13.

YU

Assigned to	Assigned on	Notes
H&MS-13, Headquarters and Maintenance Squadron 13 MALS-13, Marine Aviation Logistics Squadron 13	1957	Disestablished.

YV

Assigned to	Assigned on	Notes
H&MS-15, Headquarters and Maintenance Squadron 15	1957	Disestablished.

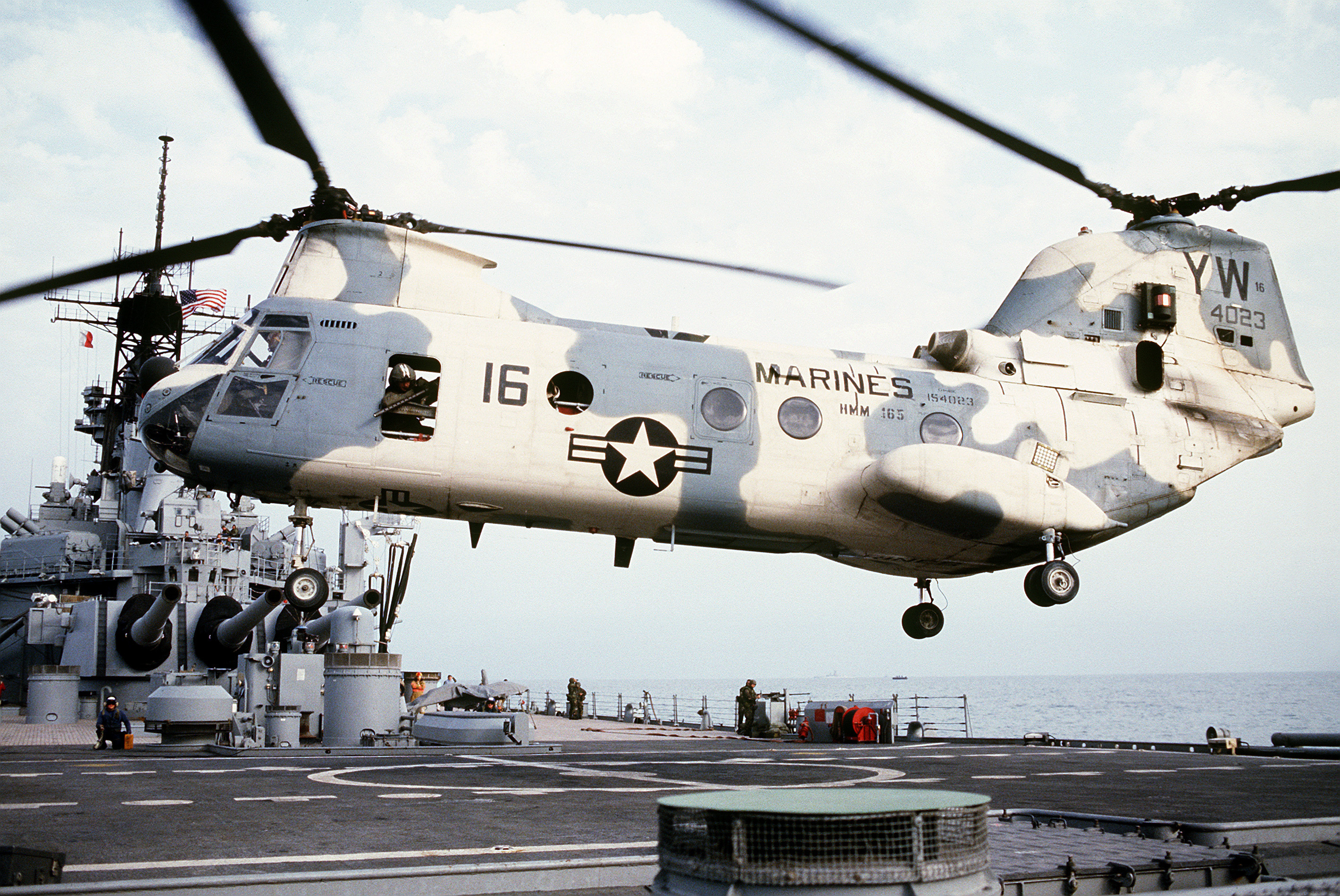
An excellent shot of a CH-46D Sea Knight of HMM-165.

YW

Assigned to	Assigned on	Notes
VMJ-1	1957	Disestablished in July 1958.
HMM-165 Re-designated VMM-165	July 1965	

YX

Assigned to	Assigned on	Notes
HMM-166 Re-designated VMM-166	September 1986	

YY

Assigned to	Assigned on	Notes
USS Midway (CV-41)	July 1945	
USS San Jacinto (CVL-30)	8 January 1946, U.S. Navy Letter FF12-5	Only in effect until December 1946.

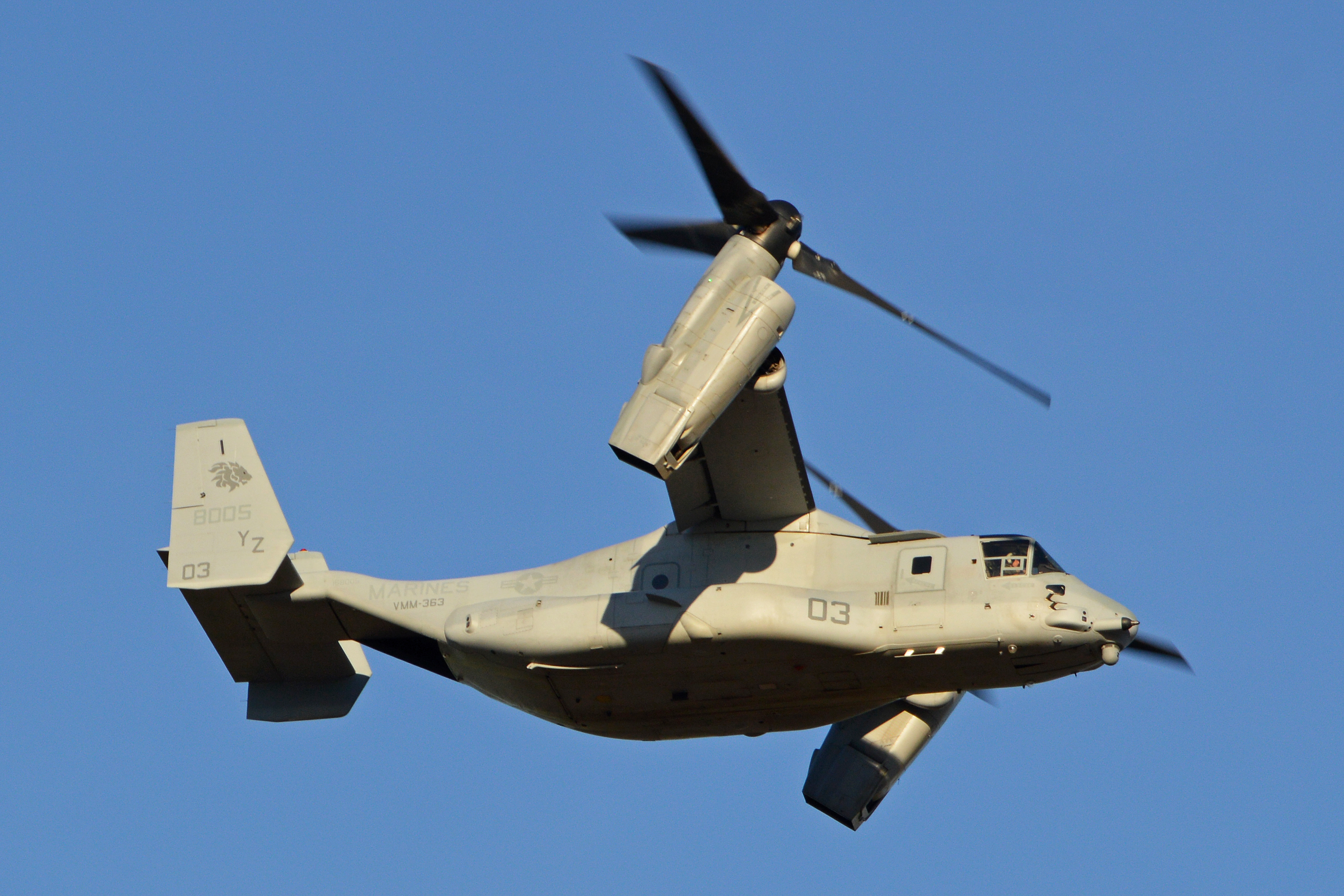
An MV-22B Osprey of VMM-363.

YZ

Assigned to	Assigned on	Notes
HMR(L)-363 Subsequently, re-designated HMM-363, HMH-363 and VMM-363	1957	

Z

Assigned to	Assigned on	Notes
USS Shangri La (CV-38)	July 1945	
USS Lake Champlain (CV-39)	8 January 1946, U.S. Navy Letter FF12-5	Only in effect until December 1946.
NAS Squantum	November 1946	
ATG-4, Air Task Group 4	1955	Code changed to "ND" in November 1956.

ZA

Assigned to	Assigned on	Notes
Attack units of Navy Air Reserve at NAS Squantum	November 1946	A very short-lived assignment.
VAH-2	November 1955	Re-designated VAQ-132 in November 1968.

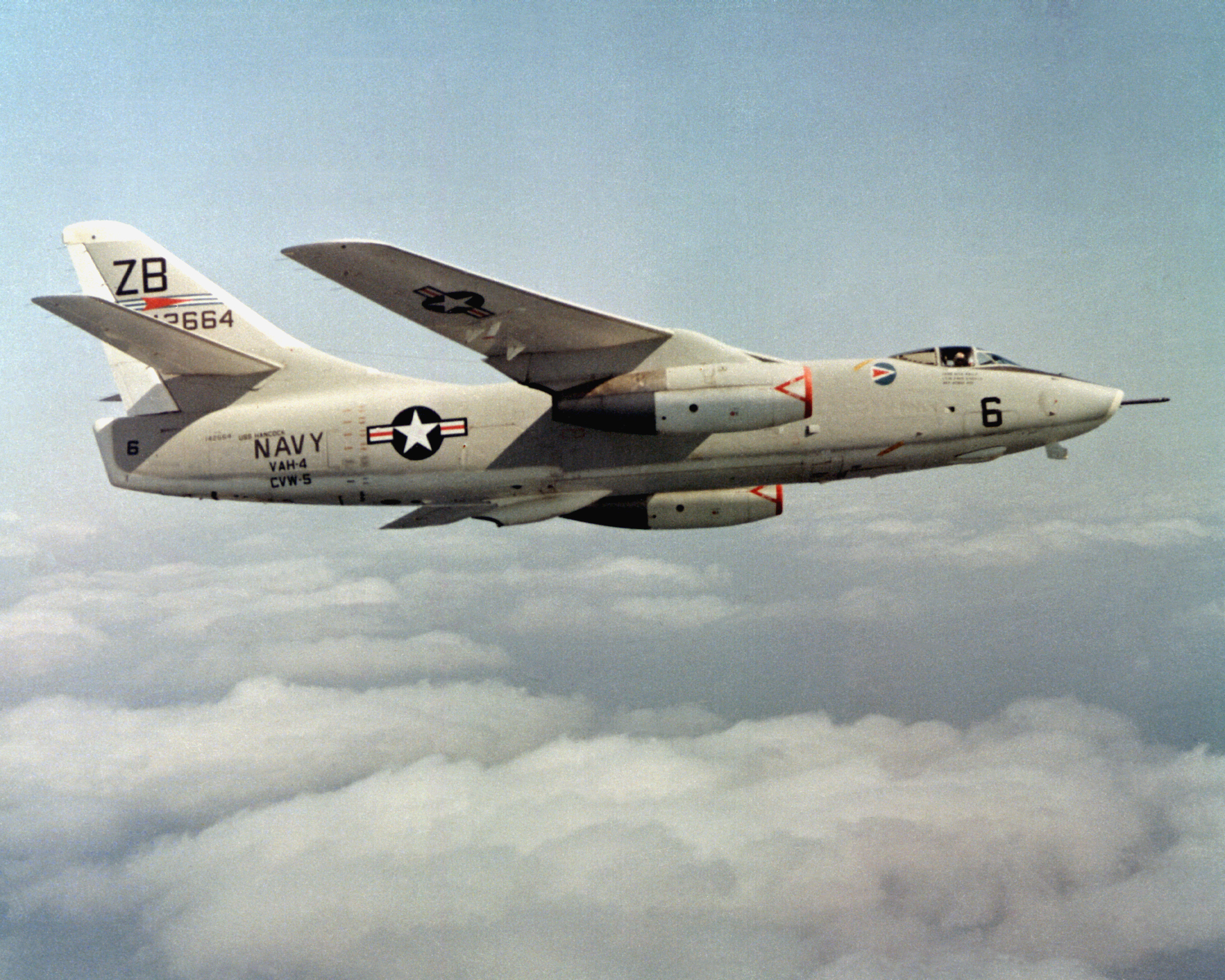
A KA-3B Skywarrior of VAH-4 in flight.

ZB

Assigned to	Assigned on	Notes
VAH-4	1957	Re-designated VAQ-131 in November 1968.

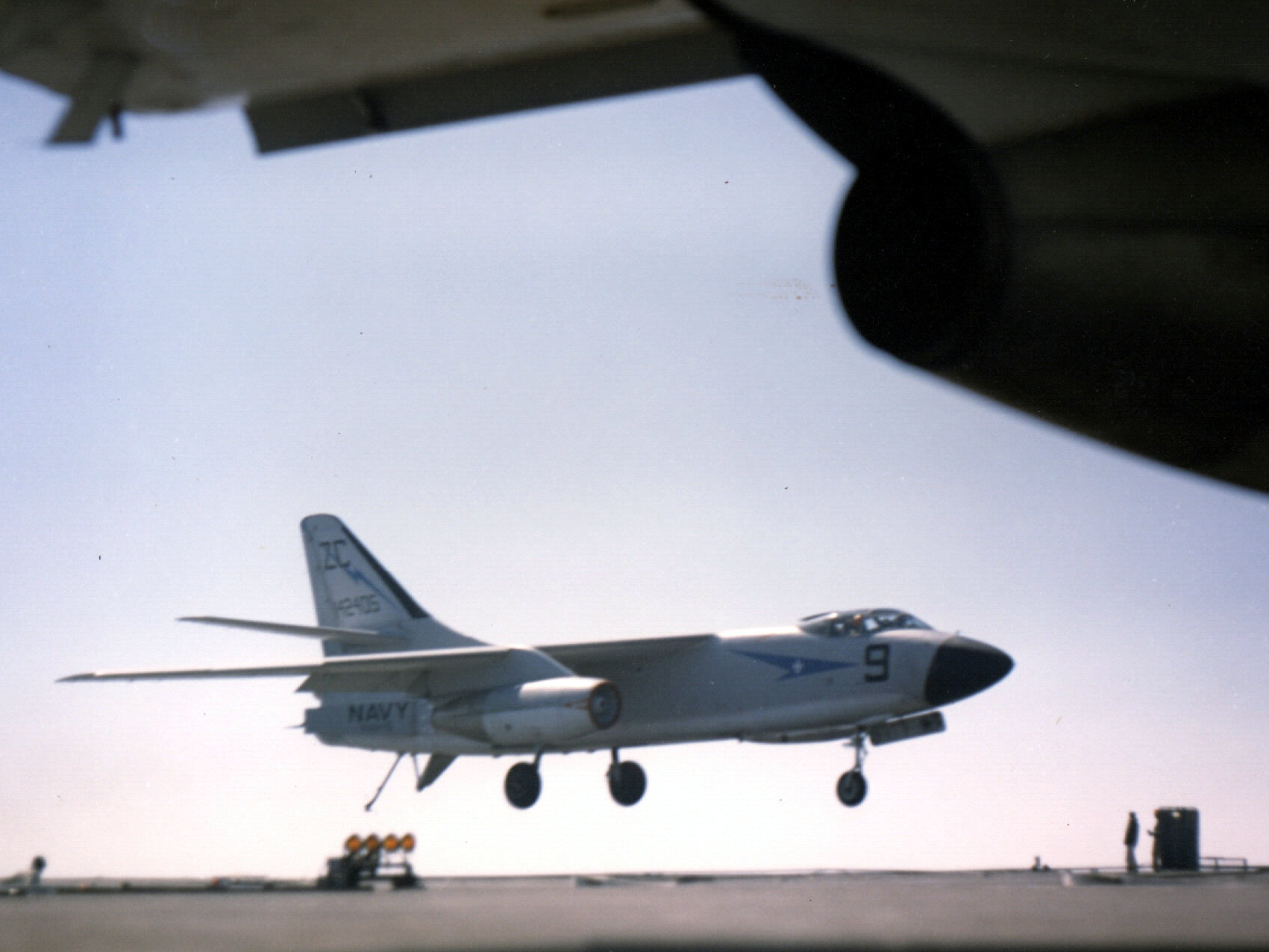
An A3D-2 Skywarrior of VAH-6 landing aboard an aircraft carrier.

ZC

Assigned to	Assigned on	Notes
VAH-6	1957	Re-designated RVAH-6 in 1971, tail code changed to "GS".

ZD

Assigned to	Assigned on	Notes
VAH-8	May 1957	Disestablished in January 1968.

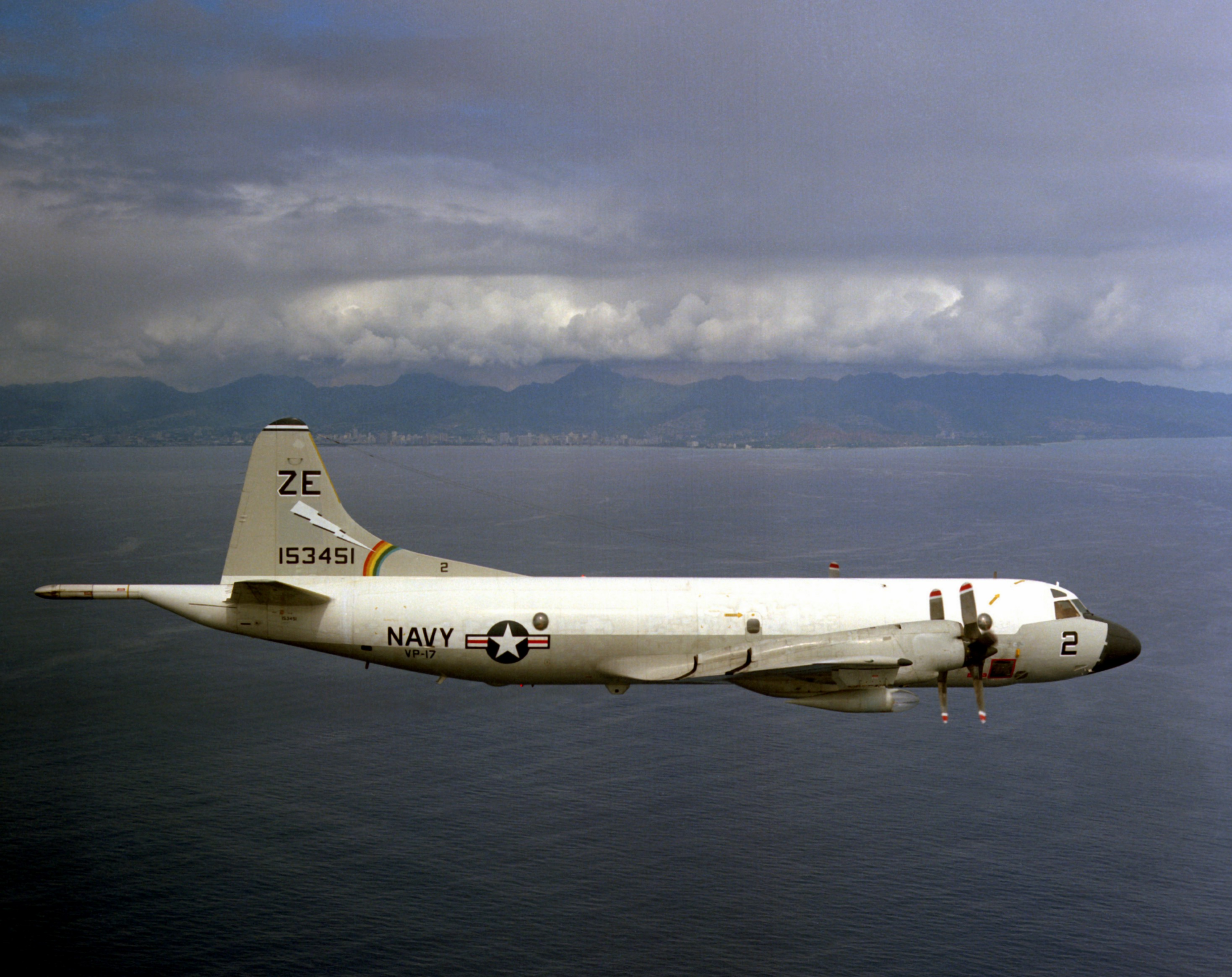
A P-3B Orion assigned to VP-17.

ZE

Assigned to	Assigned on	Notes
VA(HM)-10 Re-designated VP-17	1957	

ZF

Assigned to	Assigned on	Notes
Fighter units of Navy Air Reserve at NAS Squantum	November 1946	A very short-lived assignment.
VA(HM)-12	1957	Disestablished in 1959.

ZG

Assigned to	Assigned on	Notes
HATUPAC, Heavy Attack Training Unit Pacific	June 1957	Re-designated VAH-123. Disestablished in February 1971.

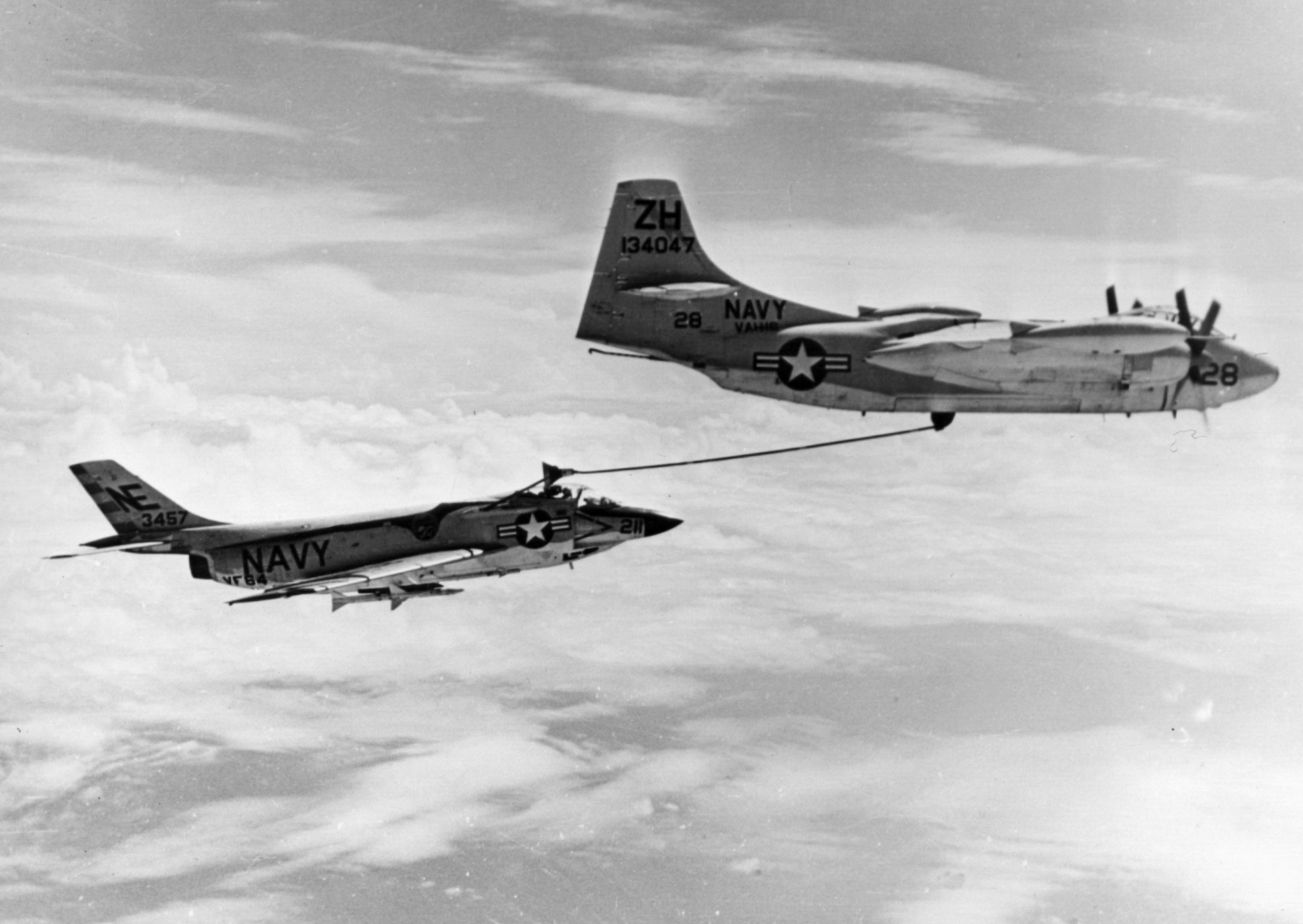
The "ZH" code on the AJ-2 Savage on this photograph indicates assignment to VAH-16.

ZH

Assigned to	Assigned on	Notes
VAH-16	15 January 1958	Disestablished in January 1959.

ZR

Assigned to	Assigned on	Notes
VAH-10	May 1961	Re-designated VAQ-129 in November 1968.

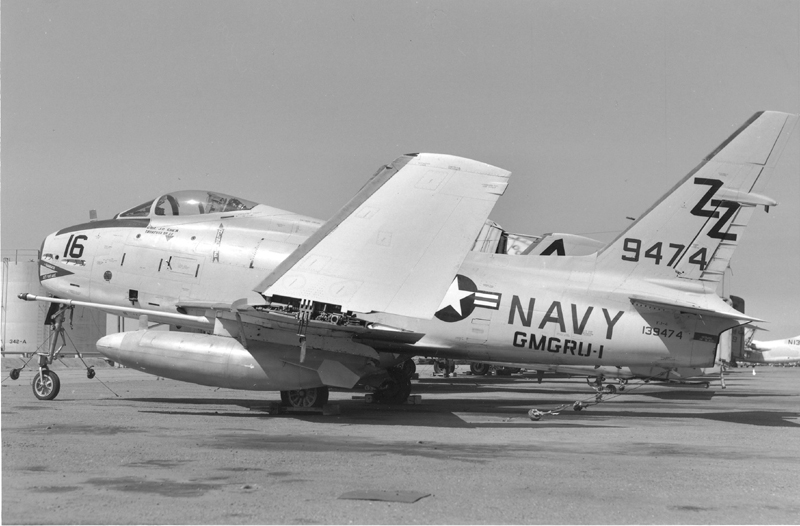
An FJ-4 Fury of Guided Missile Group 1.

ZZ

Assigned to	Assigned on	Notes
USS Boxer (CV-21)	July 1945	
USS Saipan (CVL-48)	8 January 1946, U.S. Navy Letter FF12-5	Only in effect until December 1946
GMGRU-1, Guided Missile Group 1	1957	Disestablished in September 1960.
