= Chicuelo (bullfighter) =

Spanish bullfighter (1902–1967)

Manuel Jiménez Moreno
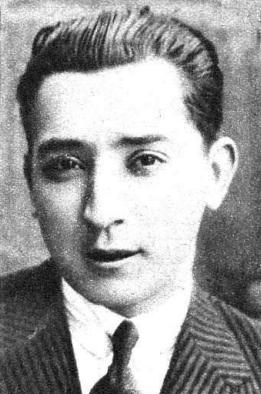
- "Chicuelo" in 1930

Personal information
- Nickname: Chicuelo
- Nationality: Spanish
- Born: 15 April 1902 Seville, Spain
- Died: 31 October 1967 (aged 65) Seville, Spain
- Monuments: Sculptures in Seville and Mexico City
- Home town: Seville
- Education: Escuela Taurina de Sevilla
- Occupation: Bullfighter
- Years active: 1917–1952
- Agent: Eduardo Borrego "Zocato" (until 1927); Luis Revenga (until 1932) (apoderados)
- Spouses: Dolores Castro Ruiz ("Dora la Cordobesita"; "La Niña"; born 22 May 1902) (m. 1927; died 1965)
- Children: Rafael Jiménez Castro "Chicuelo-III/Chicuelo Hijo" (born 1937); Manuel Jiménez Castro (born 1928); Juan Jiménez Castro (died 1944); 4 others
- Parent: Manuel Jiménez Vera "Chicuelo-I" (1879–1907) (father)
- Relative: Josefa Jiménez Moreno (sister)

Manuel Jiménez Moreno (Spanish: [manˈwel xiˈmeneθ moˈɾeno]; 15 April 1902 – 31 October 1967), better known as "Chicuelo" (Spanish: [tʃiˈkwelo]), was a Spanish bullfighter. His contributions to tauromachy are held by some – writer and bullfighting critic Luis Nieto and writer Ignacio de Cossío Pérez de Mendoza among them – to be substantial, making bullfighting what it is today. This includes the introduction of a now popular move with the bullfighting cape that has been named the chicuelina, inspired by his professional nickname.

== Early life ==
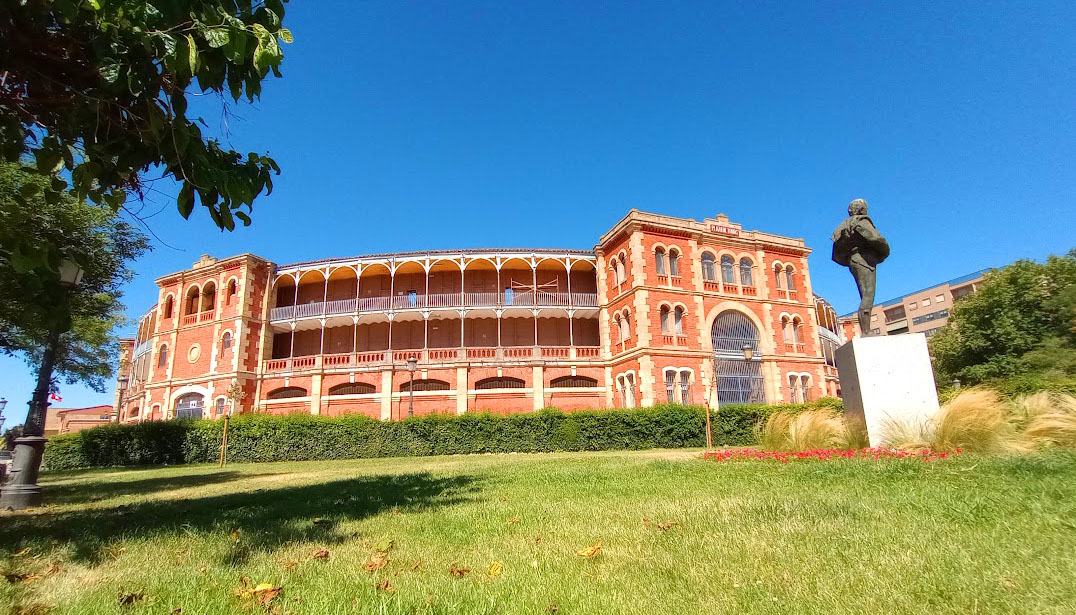
The Salamanca bullring, where Chicuelo had his début as a novillero.

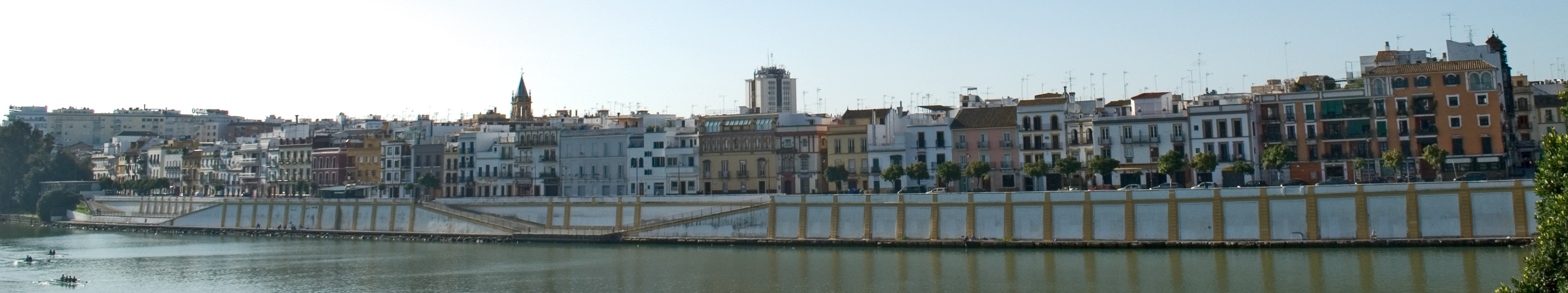
Calle Betis, Triana, Seville, where Chicuelo was born. The actual house can be seen towards the left: the three-storey red building just to the left of the yellow building.

Jiménez was born on 15 April 1902 at no. 11 Calle Betis (since changed to no. 30) in Seville's Triana neighbourhood. However, he was only 40 days old when his family moved to Calle Escoberos in the Macarena neighbourhood. Jiménez's father was Manuel Jiménez Vera "Chicuelo-I" (born 1879), who died of tuberculosis on 18 November 1907, leaving his son orphaned at the age of five. After his father's death, Jiménez moved together with his family to his paternal aunt's house; she was married to Eduardo Borrego "Zocato", a banderillero. It was he who initiated the young Jiménez – soon to be called "Chicuelo" – into the bullfighting world, and at the age of ten, Chicuelo's uncle Eduardo enrolled him in the Escuela Taurina de Sevilla (bullfighting school). Later, his uncle would become his apoderado (manager/agent), giving up this function only after his health had begun to fail.

Chicuelo had his début as a novillero (novice bullfighter who fights younger bulls) on 24 June 1917 at the Salamanca bullring, where he shared billing with Bernardo González and Juan Luis de la Rosa. The posters below make it quite clear that he made a good impression, being invited back to the same bullring only five days later, and again only six weeks after his début, this time under contract. Curious, however, is that the leftmost poster, which advertises Chicuelo's forthcoming début, names Eladio Amorós Chico de la Revoltosa as the third novillero instead of Bernardo González, whom at least two sources name (the arrangements were likely changed for some unforeseen reason).

Chicuelo's first appearance as a bullfighter in his hometown, Seville, came on 28 February 1918 at a festival organized by José Gómez Ortega (the ill-fated "Joselito"). Chicuelo had his début with horses at Zaragoza on 1 September 1918 in a mano a mano (a bullfighting event at which there are only two bullfighters on the bill rather than the usual three) with Antonio Márquez against bull calves from the Termes ranch, and his presentation in Madrid on 8 August 1919, with yearling bulls from the Antonio Flores ranch. Rounding out the billing that afternoon were García Reyes and José Martín.

On 22 September 1919, Chicuelo fought for the last time as a novillero at Écija. He alternated that afternoon with Pepete and Juan Luis de la Rosa. They fought young bulls from the Gregorio Campos ranch.

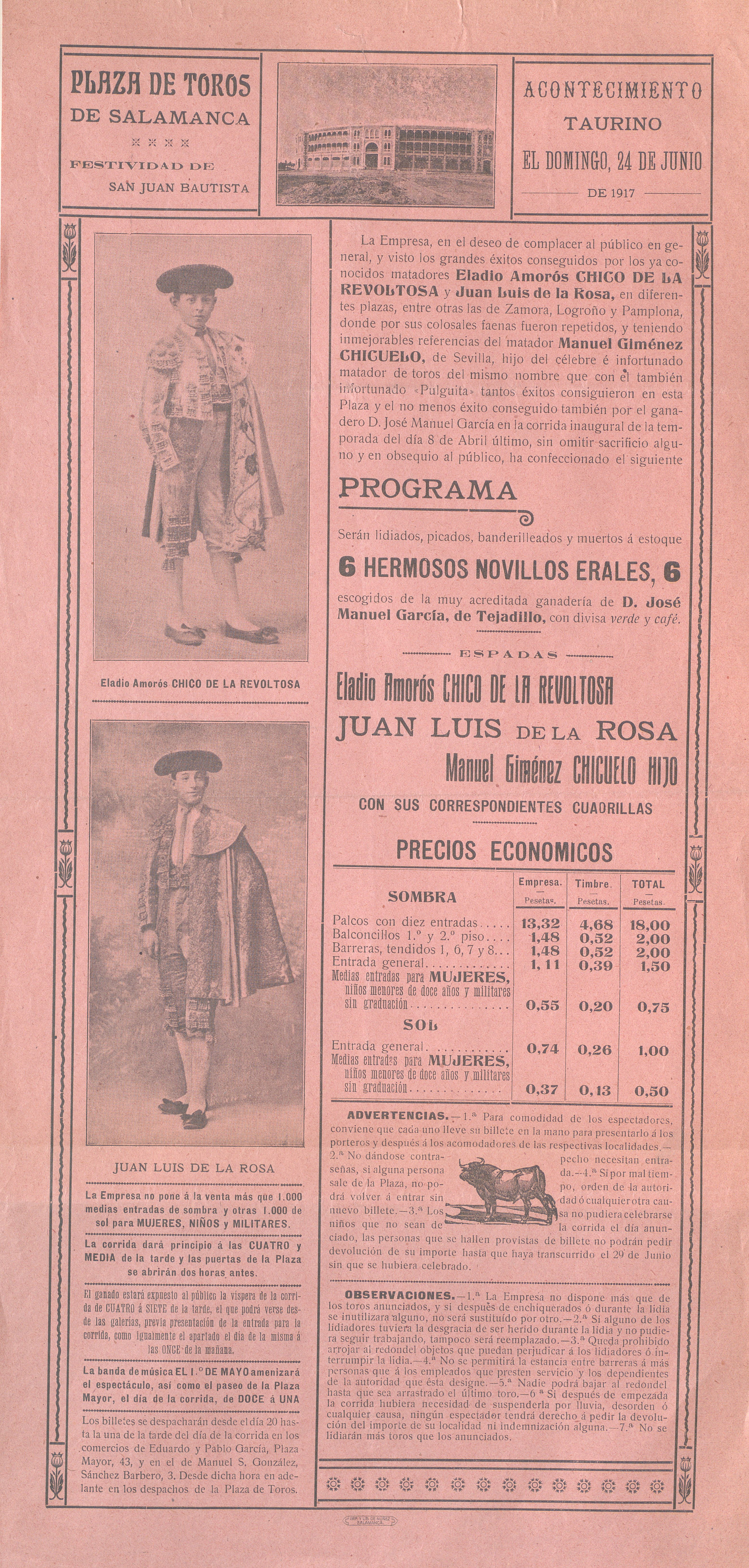
Advertisement for Chicuelo's début as a novillero at Salamanca on 24 June 1917.

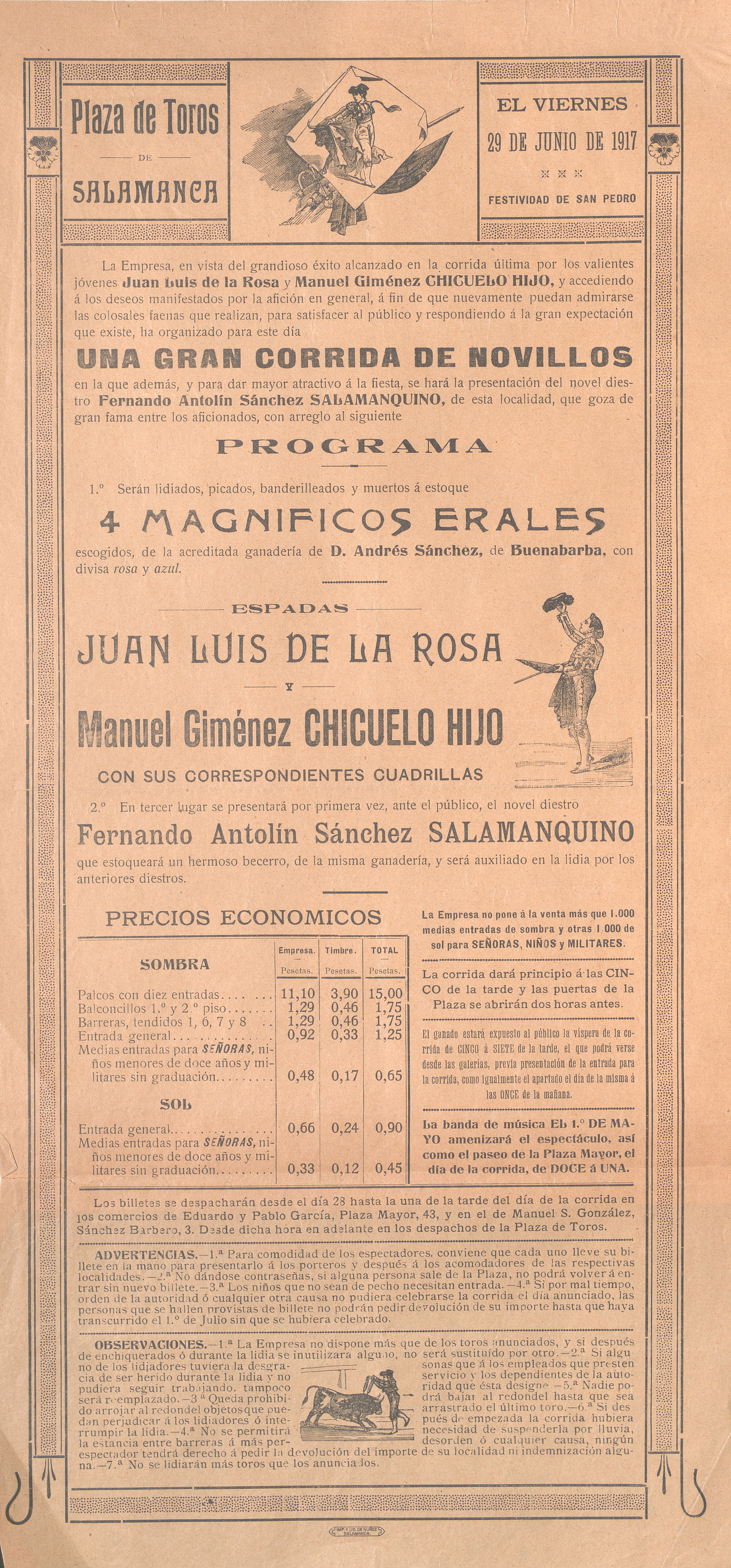
Advertisement for an engagement that was organized there five days later.

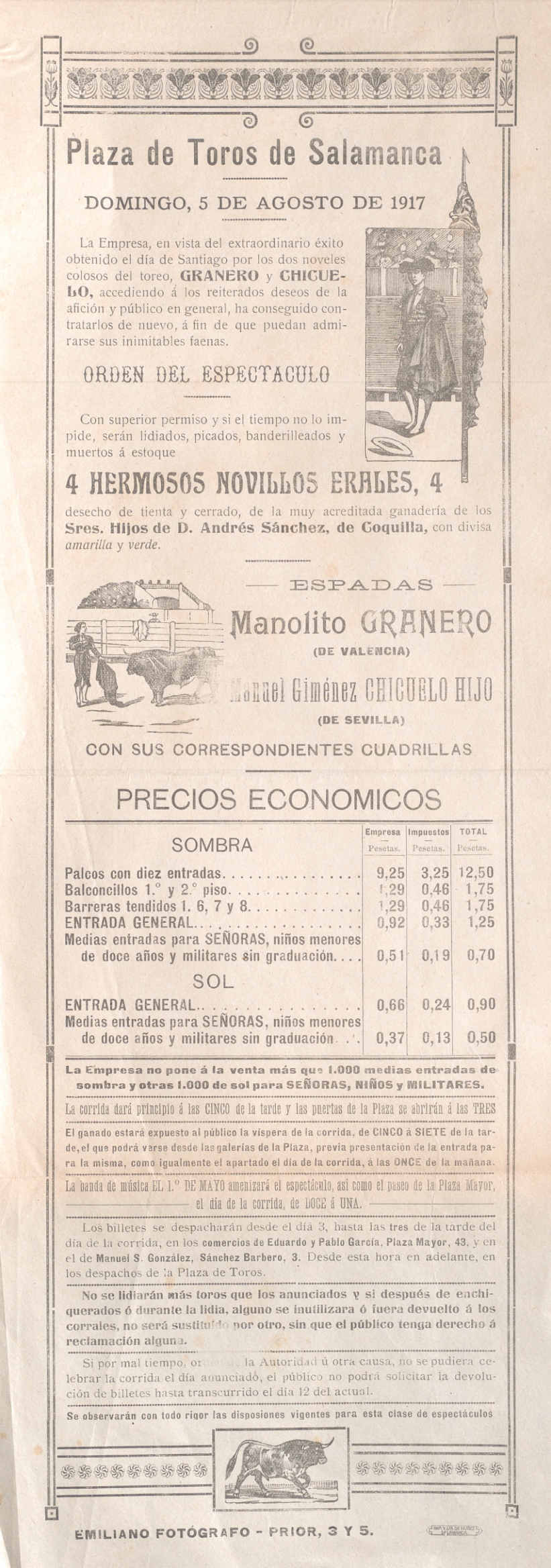
Advertisement for an engagement that was contracted there for 5 August 1917.

== Bullfighting career ==
=== 1919 ===
Chicuelo took his alternativa in his hometown, Seville, on 28 September 1919. Standing as "godfather" was Juan Belmonte, while his brother Manuel Belmonte bore witness. The bull that was slain as part of the ceremony was Vidriero ("Glazier"), supplied by the Conde de Santa Coloma ranch. Chicuelo was only 16 years old by this time.

This same year, Chicuelo had already earned himself enough money to buy a pleasant house on the Alameda de Hércules in Seville. His descendants still live there today, and the house has become a museum dedicated to Chicuelo.

On 30 September 1919, a mere two days after taking his alternativa, Chicuelo cut his first ever tail at a bullfight in Seville, alternating with Rafael "El Gallo", Juan Belmonte, and Manuel Belmonte, fighting eight bulls, four each from the Pérez de la Concha and Don Manuel Rincón ranches. The bull who was left tailless was Correcostas, from the latter ranch.

=== 1920 ===
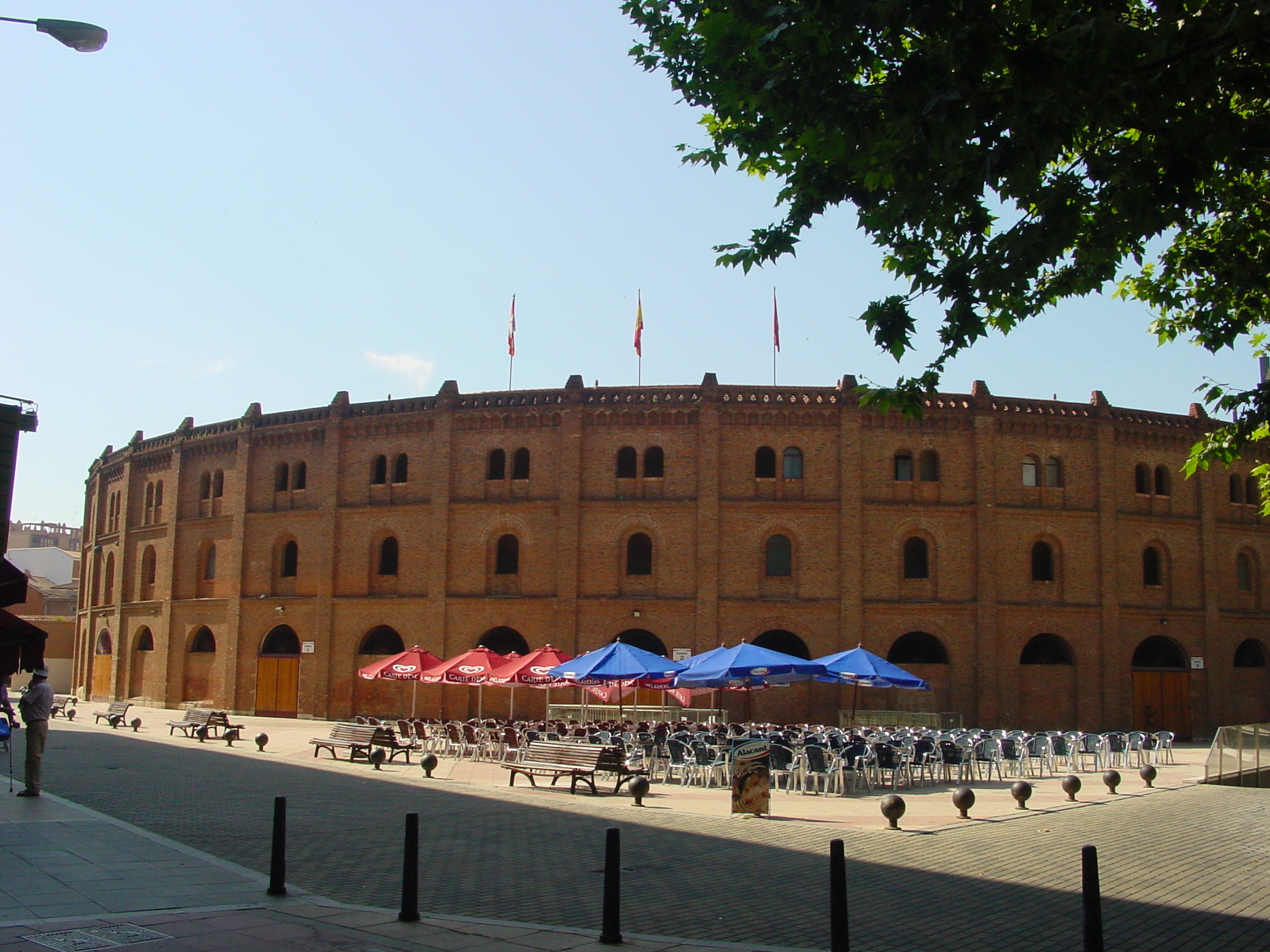
The Valladolid bullring, where Chicuelo left two bulls earless and tailless.

Confirmation of Chicuelo's alternativa came on 18 June 1920 at Las Ventas in Madrid. Standing as "godfather" this time was Rafael Gómez "El Gallo" while Juan Belmonte and Diego Mazquiarán "Fortuna" bore witness. The bull for the confirmation was Bandolero ("Outlaw") or Volandero ("Roamer" — sources differ), supplied by the Duque de Veragua ranch. He was borne out on shoulders. His alternativa was further confirmed at his début appearance in Mexico at the "El Toreo" de la Condesa bullring on 7 December 1924. Standing as "godfather" on this occasion was Victoriano Roger "Valencia I". Bulls were laid on by the Piedras Negras ranch.

In his first full bullfighting season as a fully fledged matador in 1920, Chicuelo fought in 67 corridas. Early on in the season, on 20 April, he put on such a good show in Seville, alternating with Juan Belmonte and Manuel Varé García "Varelito", facing bulls from the Don Manuel Rincón ranch, that not only was he awarded two ears, but he was also borne shoulder-high out through the gate and to the neighbourhood of Macarena, where he was then still living. At Granada that same year, on 3 June (Corpus Christi in 1920), he reaped two ears, albeit each from a different bull; the bulls were laid on by the Salas ranch. He earned himself another two ears and a tail at A Coruña on 1 August, fighting bulls from the Portuguese ranch Palha alongside Domingo Dominguín and Ignacio Sánchez Mejías. On 22 August in San Sebastián, however, while he did earn an ear, he also earned a goring in the face. An engagement on 26 September in Valladolid, though, went quite a bit better, with Chicuelo leaving two bulls from the Duque de Veragua ranch both earless and tailless. Paco Madrid and Algabeño II shared the billing with him that day.

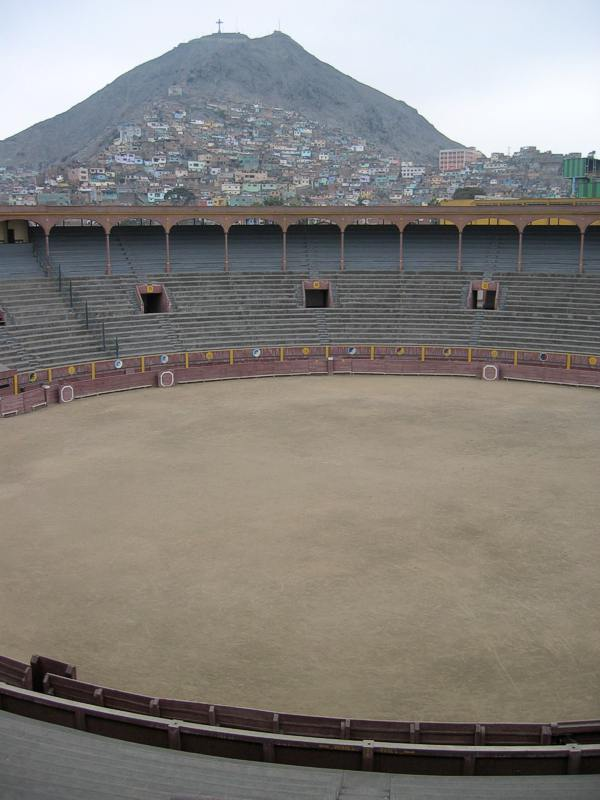
The bullfighting ground (ruedo) at Acho, Lima, where Chicuelo was hoisted on shoulders.

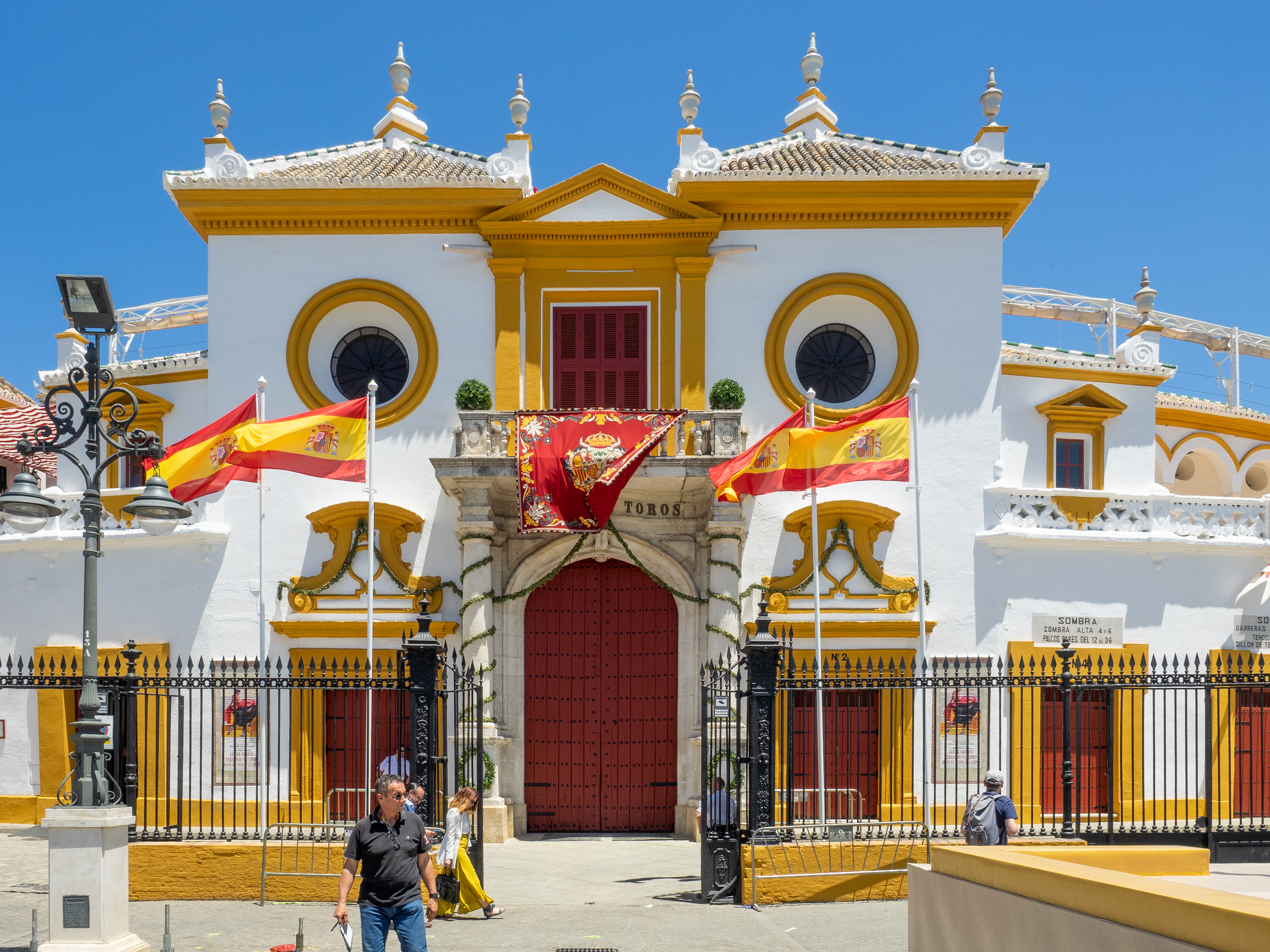
Façade of the Maestranza in Seville, where Chicuelo fought six bulls as the lone matador.

=== 1921 ===
The 1921 bullfighting season put Chicuelo at 72 corridas. He began by leaving a bull named Capirote from the Miura ranch earless in his hometown of Seville, while neither of the bullfighters with whom he alternated, Rafael "El Gallo" and Manuel Granero, was awarded any trophy. This was a pattern to be repeated over several corridas in 1921, at which only Chicuelo was awarded ears or tails. There were exceptions, such as the engagement at Valencia on 29 July at which he again won two ears, but his fellow bullfighters Juan Belmonte and Manuel Granero were each awarded one ear; M. Belmonte, however, went home empty-handed. (Granero would unfortunately be killed by a bull in Madrid less than a year later, as indeed would Varelito, in Seville, alongside whom Chicuelo had also fought). The bulls that day were laid on by the Concha y Sierra ranch. It was also in 1921 that Chicuelo made his début in Lima in Peru, appearing at the Plaza de toros de Acho on 27 December that year alongside Emilio Méndez and Mariano Montes as they all faced bulls from the Gallardo y González ranch. Only Chicuelo, however, was borne shoulder-high out of the bullring.

This was also the year when Chicuelo appeared as the lone matador facing six bulls (from the Curro Molina ranch) at the Maestranza in Seville on 24 March.

=== 1922 ===
The 1922 bullfighting season saw Chicuelo slaying bulls at 54 corridas, and indeed it was in this season that the bullfighting manoeuvre known as the chicuelina was first used by the bullfighter whose name it now bears, in Valencia on 9 April. The bull's name was Muleño, and he came from the Marqués de Guadalest ranch. On 1 June, he turned in a rather bad performance at Madrid with the afternoon's second bull, from the Albaserrada ranch, but on 15 June at Granada, fighting bulls from the Pablo Romero ranch alongside Juan Luis de la Rosa and Manuel García "Maera", he reaped two ears and a tail. The year 1922 also saw Chicuelo's début in France when he performed at Béziers. It was the first of 35 afternoons when he appeared at engagements in France.

=== 1923 ===
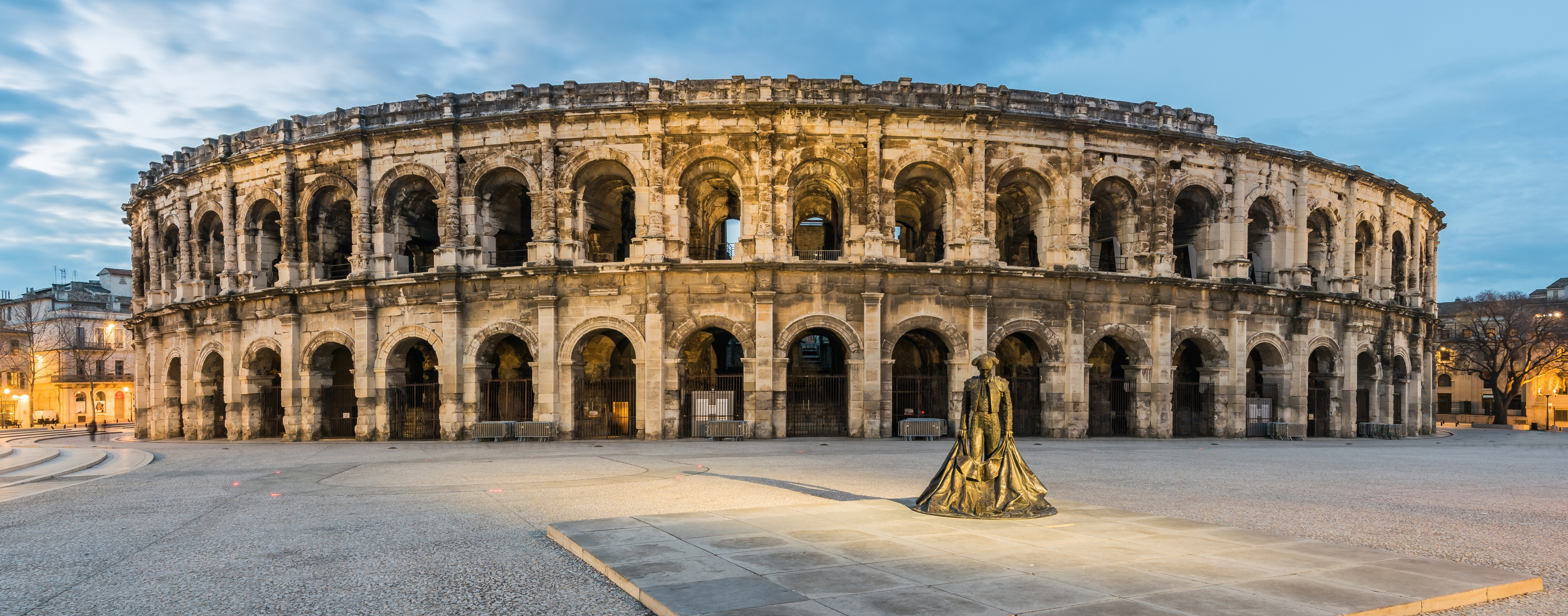
The Arena of Nîmes, where Chicuelo earned three ears and a tail.

In the 1923 bullfighting season, Chicuelo participated in 54 corridas. It would have been more, but he had to forgo seven engagements to accommodate his military obligations, and a further nine because of illness. It was a season of ups and downs for him, with his triumphs – some considerable – interspersed with injuries. He suffered two, both at Madrid, on 27 May and 3 June. At other engagements, though, he did well. On 20 May in Nîmes, fighting bulls from the Albaserrada ranch alongside Manuel García "Maera" and Gitanillo de Ricla, he earned three ears and a tail (the others earned two ears and one ear respectively). Chicuelo put on an exceptional show at Bilbao on 20 and 23 June 1923. He shared the billing on both these afternoons with Diego Mazquiarán "Fortuna" and Marcial Lalanda, but the bulls for the former afternoon were supplied by the Miura ranch, whereas the Santa Coloma ranch laid on the bulls for the latter. Chicuelo earned himself a lap of the bullfighting ground (ruedo) on the former afternoon, and on the latter, he got a "great ovation" for his performance with the second bull, and he was awarded both the fifth bull, Cimero's ears. For this last performance, he also served as a banderillero. The only other trophy awarded in either of these two bullfights was the two ears that "Fortuna" earned on the latter afternoon. Hemingway, however, in Death in the Afternoon, mentions a fight with a Vicente Martínez bull in Madrid in 1923 in which the bull was sent back to the pens after Chicuelo failed to slay him. The book even includes a picture of that bull.

=== 1924 ===
In the 1924 bullfighting season, Chicuelo participated in 39 corridas and went to Mexico, where he appeared at 13 bullfights. Before leaving for Mexico, though, he saw several corridas in which he won major trophies. On 22 June in Granada, alternating with Barajas and Algabeño against bulls from the Pablo Romero ranch, he was awarded two ears and a tail (as was Barajas), while Algabeño suffered the indignity of being knocked over by a bull. On 29 September in Seville, alternating with Antonio Posada and Manolo Litri against bulls from the Pérez de la Concha ranch, he was awarded the same trophies as in Granada, and indeed, was the only bullfighter that afternoon to be awarded any trophy. Likewise in Seville, on 12 October, alternating with Antonio Cañero (a rejoneador), Sánchez Mejías, and Antonio Posada against seven bulls from four different ranches (two each from Flores Íñiguez, Guadalest, and Rincón, and one from Flores Tassara), he was awarded two ears. In Mexico, he made a début appearance on 7 December 1924 at Toreo de la Condesa in the capital in a mano a mano with Valencia II (Victoriano Roger Serrano), facing bulls laid on by the Piedras Negras ranch. This was the first time in history that a bullfight was broadcast over radio, on this occasion by journalist Enrique Arzamendi. He appeared again at the same bullring on 14, 21, and 28 December.

=== 1925 ===
In the 1925 bullfighting season, Chicuelo had great triumphs in Mexico, again at Toreo de la Condesa, where on 25 January he achieved a "resounding triumph" with the bull Toledano from the Atenco ranch. Sharing billing with him that afternoon were Rodolfo Gaona and Antonio Márquez. A week later at the same bullring, on 1 February, he appeared at a mano a mano with Gaona, fighting bulls from the San Mateo ranch. He "immortalized" the bull Lapicero, and furthermore left the bull Consejero earless and tailless. Although billed as a mano a mano, the latter corrida was not one for very long at all. On his first bull, Gaona was knocked flying and was too badly injured to continue, leaving Chicuelo to slay all six bulls by himself. The crowd was greatly impressed, and it was reported that such a great amount of art had never before been seen in Mexico. He was hoisted up onto the crowd's shoulders, borne out of the bullring, and taken round half the capital to cheers of "¡Viva España y viva Sevilla!" This corrida also brought a fright with it, and indeed, one bullfight-goer was said to have died of fright as a result. That afternoon, a bull sprang over the barrier into the callejón, the channel around the bullfighting ground where staff and officials can be found when they are not expected to be out on the albero. The bull wounded two gatekeepers.

On 12 July 1925 in Barcelona, Chicuelo received an ovation and was awarded two ears and a tail while fighting alongside Juan Belmonte (three ears) and Pepe (José — Juan's brother) Belmonte (two ears) against bulls supplied by the Graciliano Pérez Tabernero ranch. His performance on this afternoon prompted the vice-president of the organization OJEN to declare that the bullfighter was of divine origin. On 25 October the same year, at Monumental de El toreo in Mexico, Chicuelo "immortalized" another bull, Dentista, from the San Mateo ranch. On 15 November at the same bullring, he found himself in a mano a mano with Niño de la Palma (Cayetano Ordóñez), fighting bulls from the Piedras Negras ranch. While Niño left the bullring empty-handed, Chicuelo left the bull Testaforte earless and tailless.

=== 1926 ===
In the 1926 bullfighting season, Chicuelo fought in 41 corridas in Europe and a further 17 in Mexico. On 17 January, he repeated his feat of two months earlier at the same bullring by leaving another bull, Melcochero, from the Zotoluca ranch, earless and tailless. José Flores and Niño de la Palma shared the billing with him that afternoon in Mexico. Chicuelo appeared yet again at Monumental de El toreo on 7 March, this time as an único espada, meaning "lone swordsman". He was thus performing without alternating with any other matador, and yet another bull, Peregrino from the San Mateo ranch, was left earless and tailless. At home in Spain, he did exceptionally well at a corrida in Bilbao, earning applause for the afternoon's first bull, both ears and the tail from the second, and several laps round the bullfighting ground for the fifth. One bull was sent by the Veragua ranch, whereas the other five came from the Santa Coloma ranch. The bill was filled out by Antonio Posada and Facultades, who unfortunately was gored.

The rest of the 1926 season in Spain went quite well for Chicuelo with a lap around the bullfighting ground and two ears and a tail at Granada on 6 June (with bulls from the Pablo Romero ranch, and with Juan Belmonte and Algabeño II sharing the billing), along with two bulls from the Alipio Pérez Tabernero ranch left earless and tailless at Almería on 27 August. Well rewarded too at this latter corrida were both the other bullfighters who shared the billing, with Valencia II getting two ears and a tail, and Gitanillo de Ricla leaving two more bulls earless and tailless.

Over in Mexico, Chicuelo appeared at a mano a mano with Valencia II at Toreo de la Condesa on 7 November 1926, where Mezcalero ("Mezcal Distiller") from the Piedras Negras ranch became the latest bull to lose both his ears and his tail to the visiting Spanish bullfighter. The same befell Pintor ("Painter") from the San Mateo ranch on Boxing Day at the same bullring; Marcial Lalanda and Pepe Ortiz rounded out the billing that afternoon.

=== 1927 ===
In 1927, Chicuelo appeared at 27 corridas in Europe and a further 7 in Mexico. On 16 January, he and fellow Spaniard Marcial Lalanda appeared together at a mano a mano at Toreo de la Condesa in Mexico where bulls were supplied by San Mateo, although there was also a "gift bull" from the Piedras Negras ranch. Of the San Mateo lot, Chicuelo "immortalized" one named Duende, and he also fought the "gift bull", which he left bereft of ears and tail. On the 23rd of the same month at the same bullring, he likewise took a bull's ears and tail. It was Serrano, from the La Punta ranch. Marcial Lalanda appeared at this corrida as well, although it was not a mano a mano this time, as Emilio Méndez was also on hand. On 6 February, again at Toreo de la Condesa, Pergamino ("Parchment") from the San Diego de los Padres-Atenco ranch became the latest bull to yield both his ears and his tail to Chicuelo. This was a mano a mano with Pepe Ortiz.

Once back in Spain, only one corrida seemed to be of much significance, namely one held in Córdoba on 25 May, when Chicuelo earned two ears and a tail, while sharing billing with Zurito (Gabriel de la Haba) and Joaquín Rodríguez Ortega ("Cagancho").

Until 1927, Chicuelo's uncle by marriage, Eduardo Borrego "Zocato", had been working as his apoderado (manager/agent), but he was now quite unwell and unable to continue in this capacity. His nephew was thus forced to find another apoderado, and his choice was Luis Revenga, a bullfighter from Madrid.

=== 1928 ===
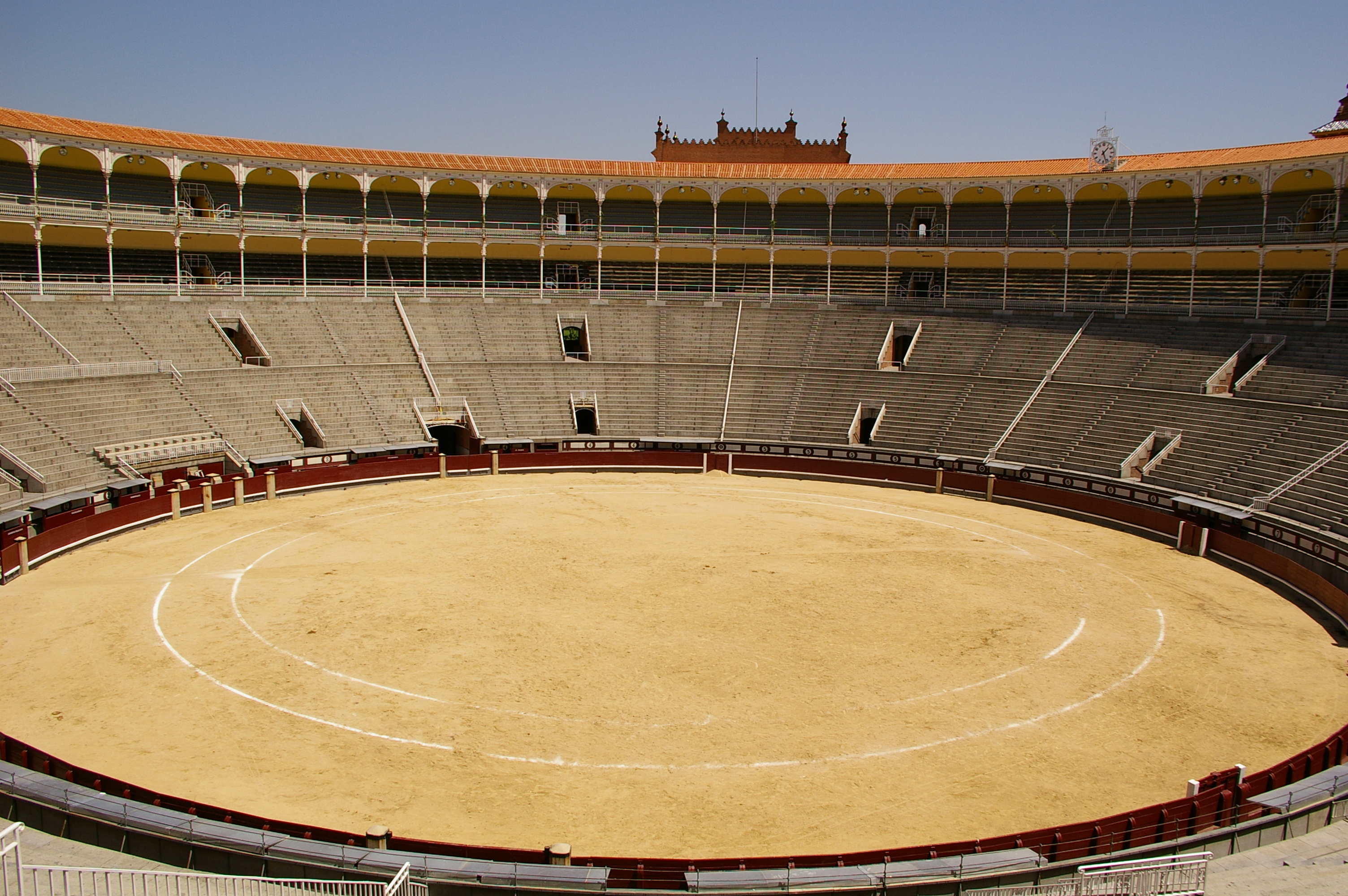
The ground at Las Ventas where Chicuelo performed his "historic" faena with Corchaíto.

The 1928 bullfighting season marked Chicuelo's professional zenith, for it was in this year that he topped the escalafón taurino (bullfighters' rankings). He fought 82 corridas in this season, and standing out among them was one on 24 May at which he fought a bull from the Graciliano Pérez Tabernero ranch named Corchaíto. Chicuelo's faena (series of passes before the bullfighter slays the bull) with Corchaíto is held to be historic in tauromachy, a defining moment in which the hallmarks of modern bullfighting were laid down. The whole concept of linking the muletazos (moves with the muleta) together was established that afternoon in Madrid by Chicuelo. It is for this, first and foremost, that he is remembered. Witnessing this moment in bullfighting history were Joaquín Rodríguez Ortega ("Cagancho") and Vicente Barrera, who received confirmation of his alternativa that afternoon. For his efforts with Corchaíto, Chicuelo was awarded both the bull's ears and two laps round the bullfighting ground with the bull.

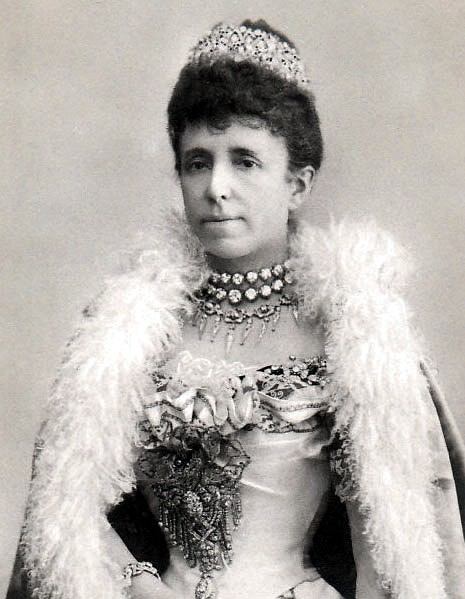
Queen Maria Christina

At a benefit bullfight for the bullfighter Conejito at Barcelona on 5 July, Chicuelo once again left a bull, this one named Escandaloso, from the Juan Sánchez ranch, with neither ears nor tail. He had dedicated the bull to Rafael Gómez Ortega "el Gallo". Others on the bill that afternoon were Antonio Cañero (a rejoneador) and Niño de la Palma. Four days later in Murcia, he earned himself two ears and a tail while fighting bulls from the Encinas ranch alongside Joaquín Rodríguez Ortega ("Cagancho") and Francisco Vega de los Reyes ("Curro Puya"). Two days after that, on 11 July, at Pamplona, he was allowed a lap of the ring after his performance with bulls from the Pablo Romero ranch alongside Marcial Lalanda, Niño de la Palma, and Curro Puya. On 13 August in San Sebastián, Chicuelo not only reaped a full set of appendages from the afternoon's fifth bull (from the Graciliano Pérez Tabernero ranch), but also earned a lap round the bullfighting ground in the presence of royalty, for Her Majesty Maria Christina of Austria, formerly Spain's Queen Consort, was in attendance, and along with her had come a number of the Infantes and Infantas. Four ears and a tail came Chicuelo's way at Málaga on 27 August from Pablo Romero bulls. Also on the bill that afternoon were Curro Puya and E. Torres. Chicuelo had no engagements in Mexico over the winter.

=== 1929 ===
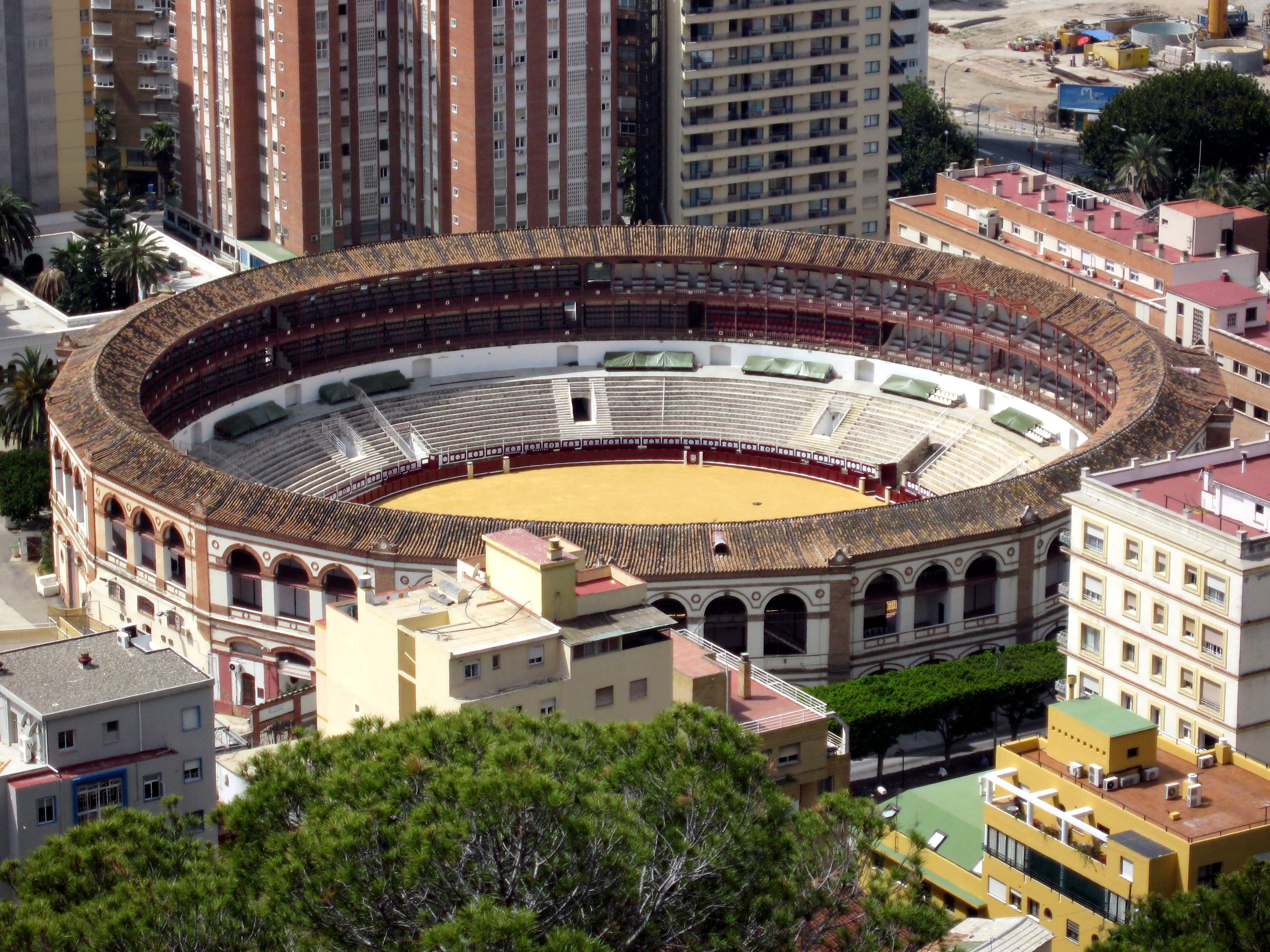
The Plaza de toros de la Malagueta in Málaga, where Chicuelo suffered his worst ever goring.

While the 1928 bullfighting season might have been Chicuelo's professional high point, the 1929 bullfighting season was marred by two serious gorings, which Chicuelo himself said made him lose his place before the bull. The first happened on 14 April in Barcelona while he was fighting bulls from the Trespalacios (7) and Villarroel (1) ranches alongside Antonio Márquez, Joaquín Rodríguez Ortega ("Cagancho"), and Ricardo González, who was there to take his alternativa. The bull was the one sent from Villarroel, and he gored the bullfighter in the thigh. The other goring, also to his thigh, was the most serious of his career. It happened at a corrida in Málaga on 2 September as he was fighting bulls from the Félix Moreno Ardanuy (Saltillo) ranch alongside Niño de la Palma and Curro Puya. He suffered from this doring for a long while. Other corridas in the 1929 season were quite satisfactory. Chicuelo was awarded two ears and a tail both at Alicante on 29 June and at Gijón on 15 August, in the former instance fighting bulls from the Concha y Sierra ranch alongside Antonio Posada and Niño de la Palma, and in the latter instance fighting bulls from the Herederos de Cobaleda ranch alongside Valencia II and Marcial Lalanda.

=== 1930 ===
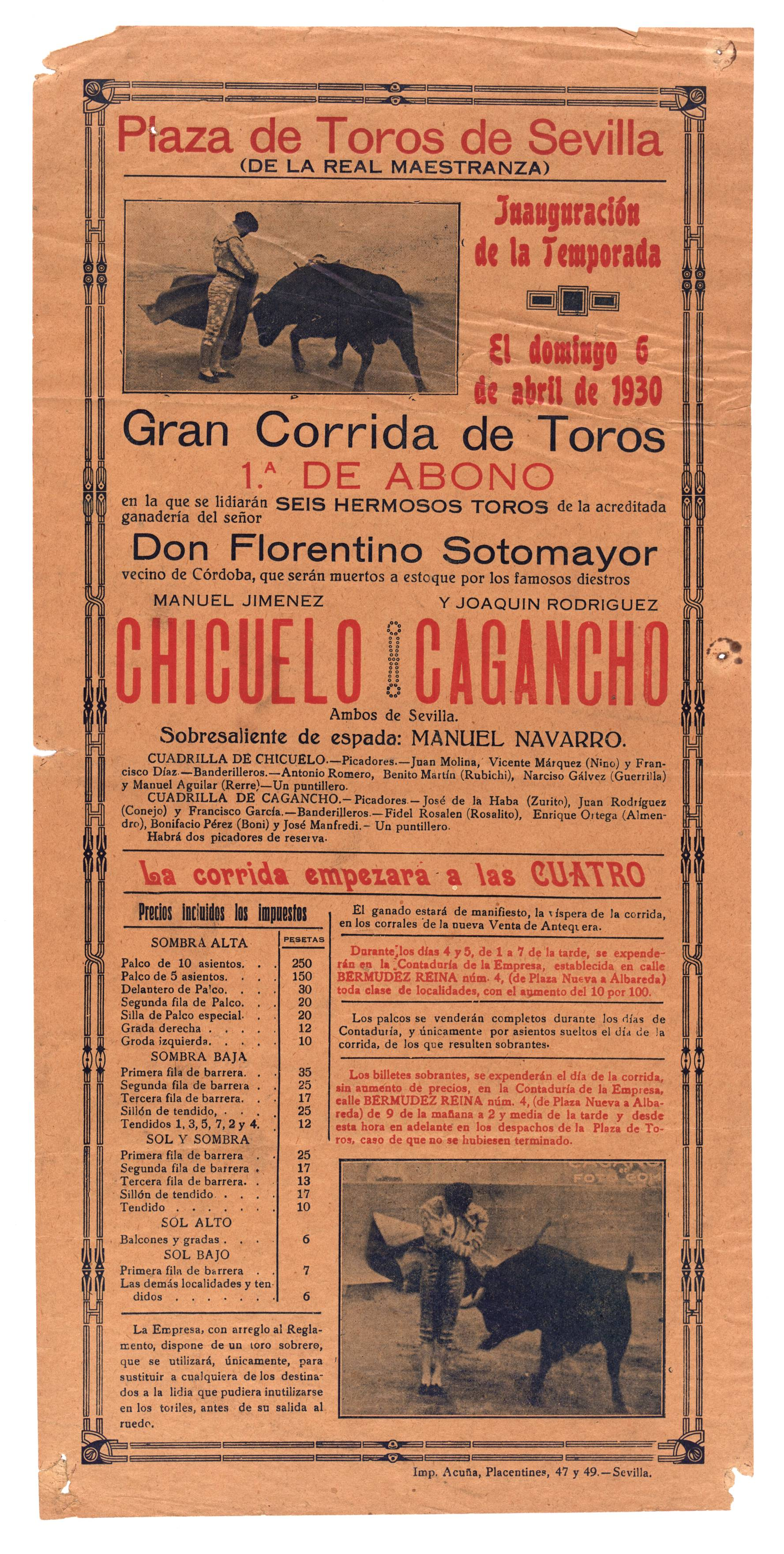
Poster for the upcoming 6 April 1930 season-inaugurating bullfight at La Maestranza in Seville, at which Manuel Jiménez "Chicuelo" was to appear, alongside "Cagancho".

In 1930, Chicuelo fought in 30 corridas in Europe and 7 in Mexico. Of the 30 in Europe, three were in France — one in Bordeaux and two in Marseille. However, he began and ended the year in Mexico, earning a lap round the bullfighting ground along with two ears and a tail after fighting bulls from the San Diego de los Padres ranch alongside Heriberto García and Alberto Balderas. Chicuelo's other outstanding bullfights that year all seem to have been in Mexico, and this year he showed up at engagements not only in Mexico City, but also in Guadalajara, Torreón, and Querétaro — this last one on Christmas Day. At none of these did he ever earn less than two ears.

One of the European engagements was the season opener in Seville, in which Chicuelo appeared at a mano a mano with Joaquín Rodríguez Ortega ("Cagancho"), as evidenced by the poster at right.

=== 1931 ===
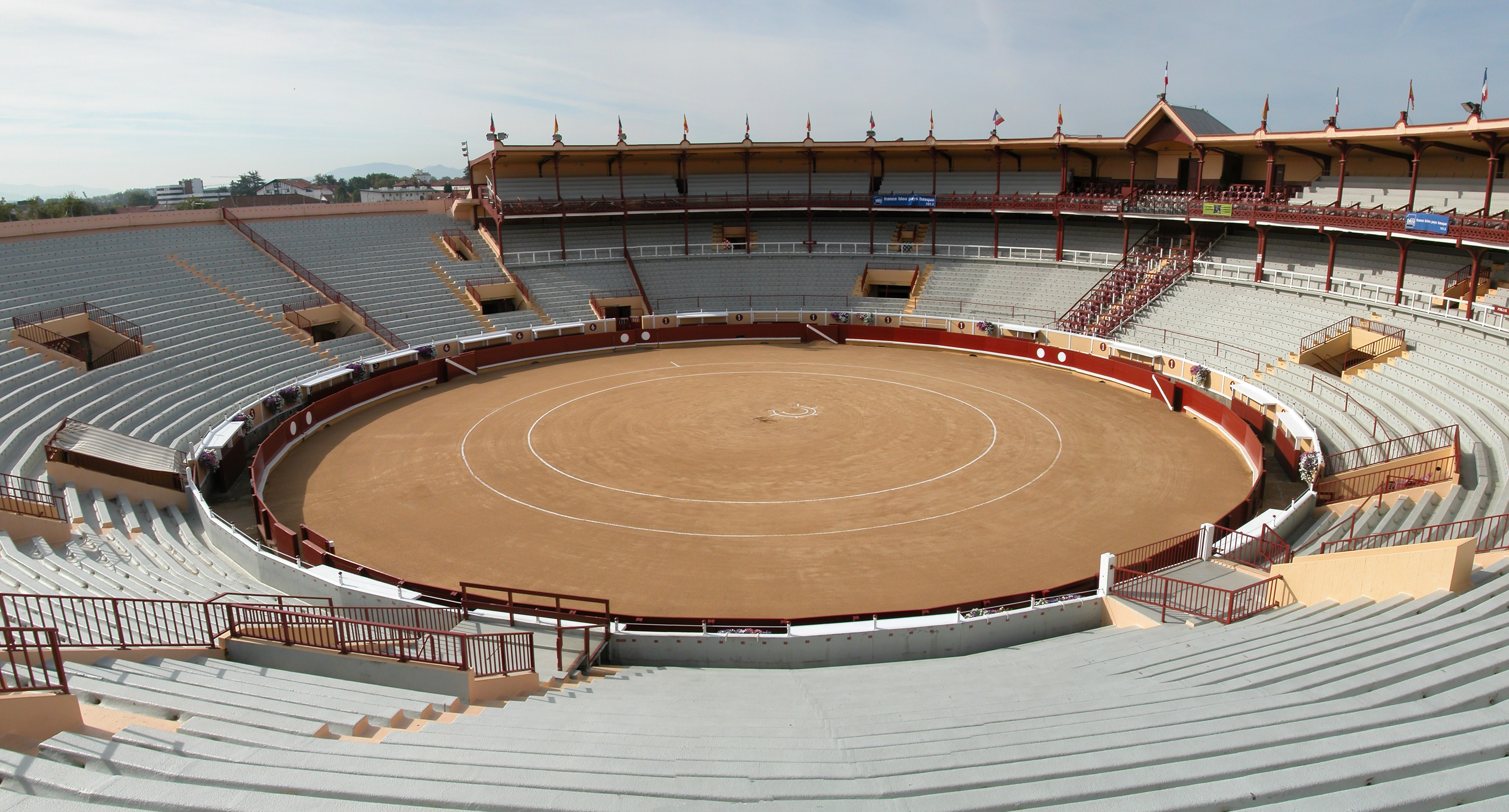
The Arènes de Bayonne, where Chicuelo and Jesús Solórzano each earned two ears.

Chicuelo fought in 18 corridas in Spain in 1931, and in eight in Mexico. This was the last year when he plied his trade in that country.

On 11 January, Chicuelo appeared at Toreo de la Condesa in Mexico City fighting bulls from the Zacatepec ranch alongside Carmelo Pérez and David Liceaga (who was taking his alternativa) and earned four ears and two tails. He did even better on 18 January in León, reaping six ears and three tails from bulls supplied by San Mateo in a mano a mano with Heriberto García.

On 15 February, again at Toreo de la Condesa, Chicuelo once more earned four ears and two tails, and also "immortalized" the bull Zacatecano. The San Mateo and Queréndaro ranches each supplied four bulls in a mano a mano with David Liceaga. At San Luis Potosí on 22 February, he found himself in a mano a mano with Guillermo Morones (who also took his alternativa that day, with Chicuelo as his "godfather"), fighting bulls from the Santo Domingo ranch. He once again earned four ears and two tails.

Chicuelo's European appearances in 1931 were not limited to Spain. On 14 June in Marseille, he was borne shoulder-high out of the bullring after facing bulls from the Lescot Viret ranch along with Susoni in a mano a mano. On 6 September in Bayonne, he reaped two ears fighting bulls from the Antonio Márquez (formerly Guadalest) ranch, as did the Mexican bullfighter Jesús Solórzano, while the third bullfighter on the bill, Joaquín Rodríguez Ortega ("Cagancho"), left empty-handed.

=== 1932 ===
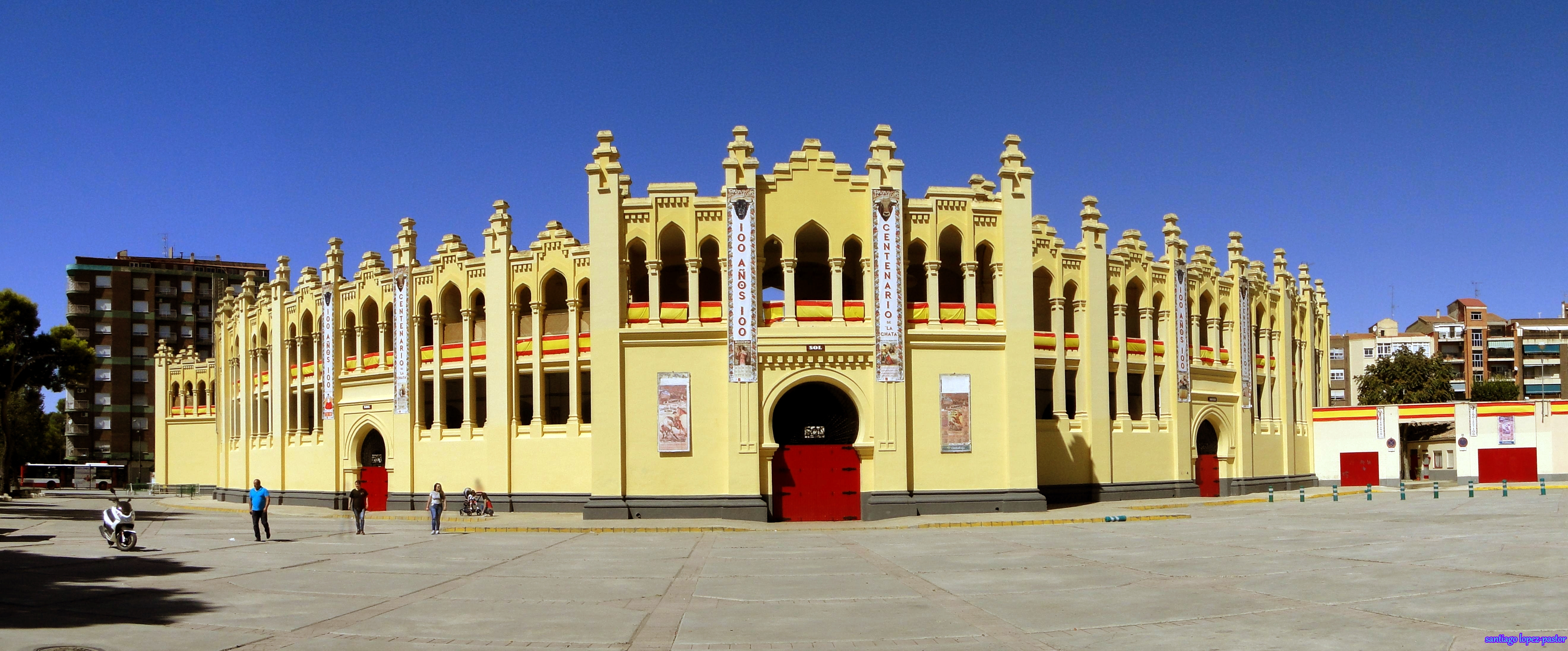
The Albacete bullring, where Chicuelo suffered a deep goring.

In the 1932 bullfighting season, Chicuelo had 43 bullfighting engagements, all in Europe, but not all in Spain. A corrida in Barcelona on 5 May (or 6 May — the source is unclear on that point) stood out as historic. He came away with a full set of appendages from Rebujina, a bull from the Villamarta ranch and was allowed a trip round the bullfighting ground. Filling out the bill at this event were Antonio Cañero (a rejoneador), Joaquín Rodríguez Ortega ("Cagancho"), and "Chiquito de la Audiencia" (Juan Martín Caro Cases).

In June of this year, Chicuelo reaped an ear in Béziers, France, and in August, he triumphed in Lisbon. A corrida on 11 September in Albacete, however, only brought him a goring, 14 cm deep, in the belly, administered by a bull from the Pablo Romero ranch, but only ten days later, in Salamanca, he took a triumphant walk round the bullfighting ground.

Until this season, Chicuelo had always had an apoderado, but after parting ways with Luis Revenga at this time, he never again had one to manage his career for him.

=== 1933 ===
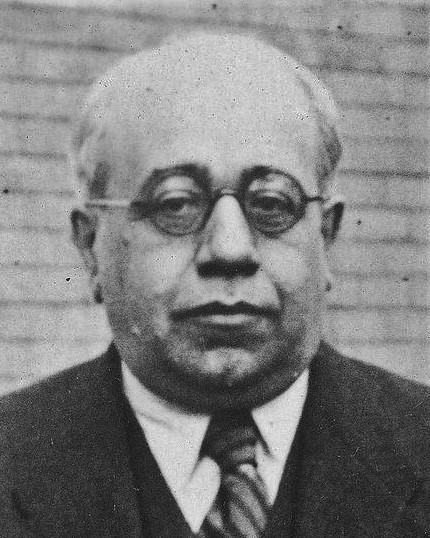
Azaña

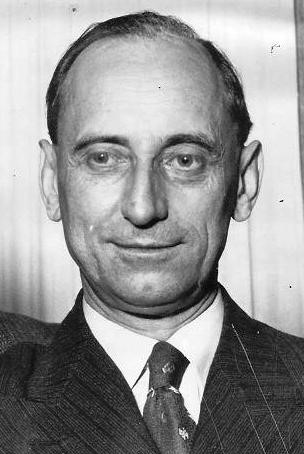
Casares

The year 1933 brought 30 bullfighting engagements Chicuelo's way. One of these was a benefit bullfight on 27 April in which he substituted for Vicente Barrera, who had been wounded in Valencia. The others who performed that day were "Armillita Chico" (Fermín Espinosa) and Fernando Domínguez Rodríguez. Chicuelo left one Alipio Pérez Tabernero bull earless and tailless (the ranch had laid on six), but what set this bullfight apart from any other at which he had performed was the unmistakable sign of a major shift in Spain's political life, for up there in the loge, witnessing the performance, were the country's new leaders, the Prime Minister, later President of the Republic, Don Manuel Azaña, along with the Minister of Governance Santiago Casares Quiroga and an entourage. Perhaps somewhat ironically, the bullfight was held in Ciudad Real, whose name means "Royal City".

On 18 June, Chicuelo took part in a corrida in homage to Martín Agüero Ereño, and he took a lap of the bullfighting ground. Sharing the billing that afternoon were Vicente Barrera and Fernando Domínguez. The bulls were supplied by the Julián Fernández ranch. He also reaped two ears and a tail in Jerez de la Frontera on 16 September from one of the bulls supplied by the Carmen de Federico ranch while fighting alongside Pepe Gallardo and Diego de los Reyes, who was taking his alternativa that afternoon.

=== 1934 & 1935 ===
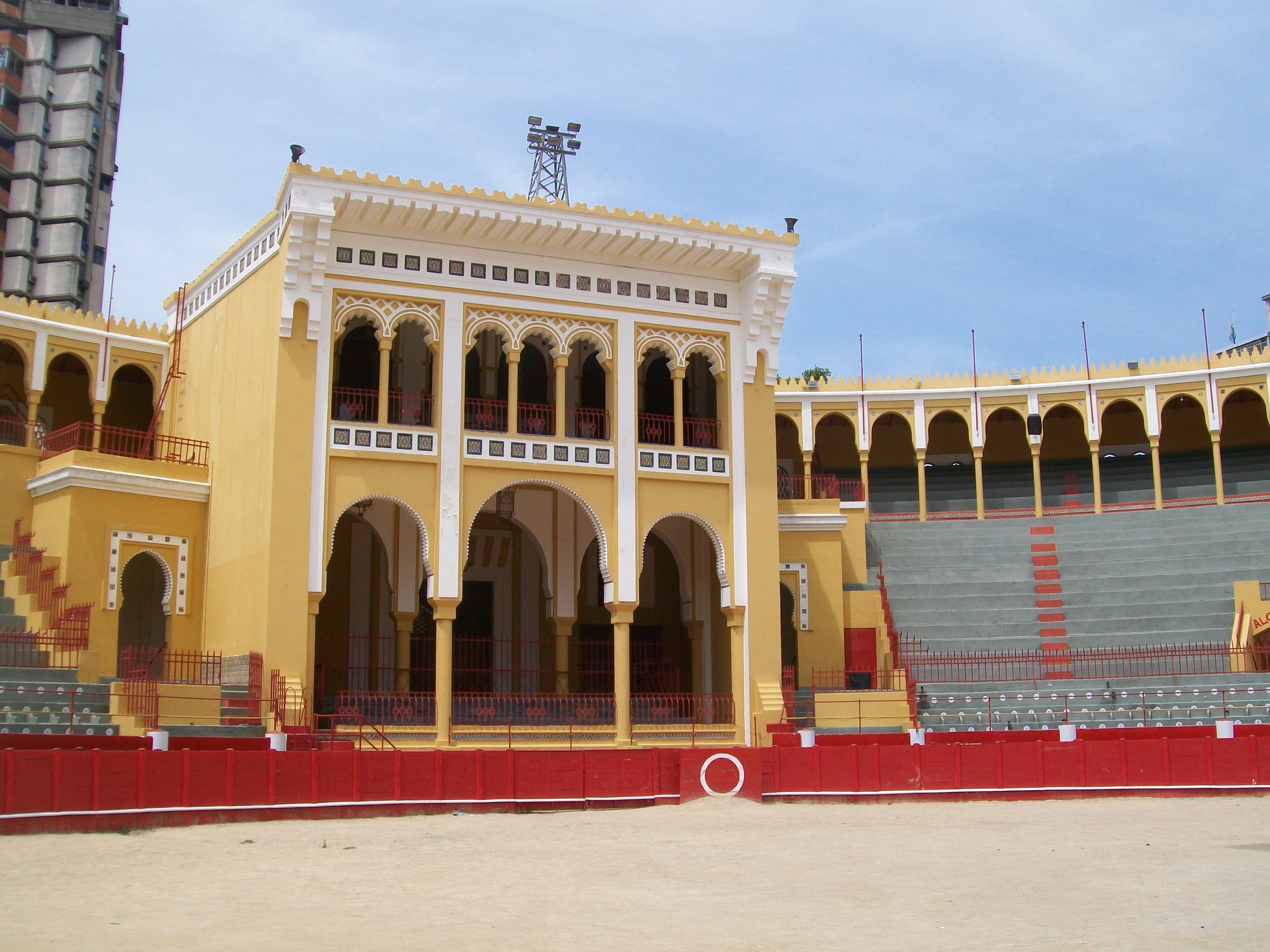
The Maestranza de Maracay bullring, the scene of Chicuelo's Venezuelan triumph.

Chicuelo saw 14 corridas in 1934, and perhaps would have seen more had he not been involved in a traffic accident in late July. There were, however, no serious consequences arising from this. In 1935, he saw only seven corridas in Spain, but also went to Latin America, appearing at the Maestranza de Maracay bullring in Venezuela on 18, 19 and 20 January. On that second afternoon, alternating with Eleazar Sananes "Rubito" and Vicente Barrera, he slew the day's fourth bull, named Carpintero, from the Don Antonio Pérez Tabernero ranch, reaping both Carpintero's ears and his tail. Don Antonio Pérez Tabernero had furnished three purebred bulls for the engagement, while La Providencia had supplied three half-caste bulls.

=== Civil War years (1936–1939) ===
Many Spanish bullfighters had their careers interrupted by the Spanish Civil War, and Chicuelo was no exception. As a result of the fighting and other disruptions (such as Las Ventas being used as a Francoist concentration camp), he saw a few seasons that were less active than usual. The war's outbreak caught Chicuelo in Madrid, but he managed to reach Barcelona, and after a while could leave the country. After a strenuous odyssey, he was able to return to his hometown, Seville, in mid-March 1937.

Nevertheless, there was some bullfighting activity amid the turmoil arising from the struggle to control Spain, with Chicuelo managing to appear at ten bullfights and five festivals in 1936, ten bullfights and three festivals in 1937, and seven bullfights and two festivals in 1938. Standing out among his performances was, for instance, Barcelona on 7 June 1936 (lap of the ring, two ears, tail, fighting Julián Fernández bulls alongside Antonio Márquez and R.V. "Gitanillo de Triana"), and his last corrida before the civil war broke out was in Madrid on 5 July 1936. The López Cobos (formerly Coquillas) ranch laid on the bulls, while Antonio García "Maravilla" and Valencia II rounded out the bill. The engagement was otherwise unremarkable.

On Sunday, 30 August 1936, there was a bullfighting festival at Madrid's bullring to benefit blood hospitals and popular militias organized by the provincial committee of the Communist Party of Spain and Radio Sur. Eight bulls drawn from various accredited bull ranches were fought and slain by the bullfighters El Gallo, Chicuelo, Fuentes Bejarano, Noain, El Estudiante, Domingo Ortega, Luis Morales, and Rafaelillo. On parade at the event was the third company of the Aida Lafuente Battalion from the Mangada Company. There were also carriages on parade, and a member of the Communist Party's central committee took part. On Sunday, 22 September 1936, there was yet another benefit bullfighting festival at Bilbao organized by International Red Aid to benefit blood hospitals. The band played Himno de Riego and The Internationale, for which the bullfight-goers stood up. Chicuelo, Rayito, Eladio Amorós, Antonio Sánchez, and Finito de Valladolid drew loud ovations from the stands as they fought six young bulls from the Don Vicente Martínez ranch.

In 1937, Chicuelo fought at corridas in both Republican and Nationalist zones of Spain, even participating in benefits for those on each side. The two mentioned above, for instance, were definitely Republican in nature, whereas the one on 6 May in Seville, for the benefit of the women's section of the Falange Española de las JONS was clearly Nationalist in nature. He also had two bullfighting engagements in Lisbon that year.

There was little in the way of bullfighting activity in 1938, but in 1939, the civil war ended (with Francisco Franco emerging as Spain's leader), and there was a consequent upswing in bullfighting. Chicuelo appeared at 15 corridas that year. On 2 July in Seville, fighting bulls from the Tassara ranch alongside Rafael Vega de los Reyes "Gitanillo de Triana" and Manuel Rodríguez "Manolete", he reaped two ears and a tail. The other two bullfighters did quite well, too, each earning two ears; "Manolete" also took his alternativa, with Chicuelo as "godfather" and "Gitanillo de Triana" as witness. The 18 July bullfights in Granada were even more successful for Chicuelo. He earned four ears and two tails from bulls supplied by the Concha y Sierra ranch, while Domingo Ortega and Rafaelillo were left empty-handed.

Outside bullfighting, the civil war took a personal toll on Chicuelo when his boyhood friend and frequent bullfighting companion Juan Luis de la Rosa was shot along with his lover by Republican militiamen at a graveyard in Barcelona on 10 September 1938.

=== Early 1940s ===
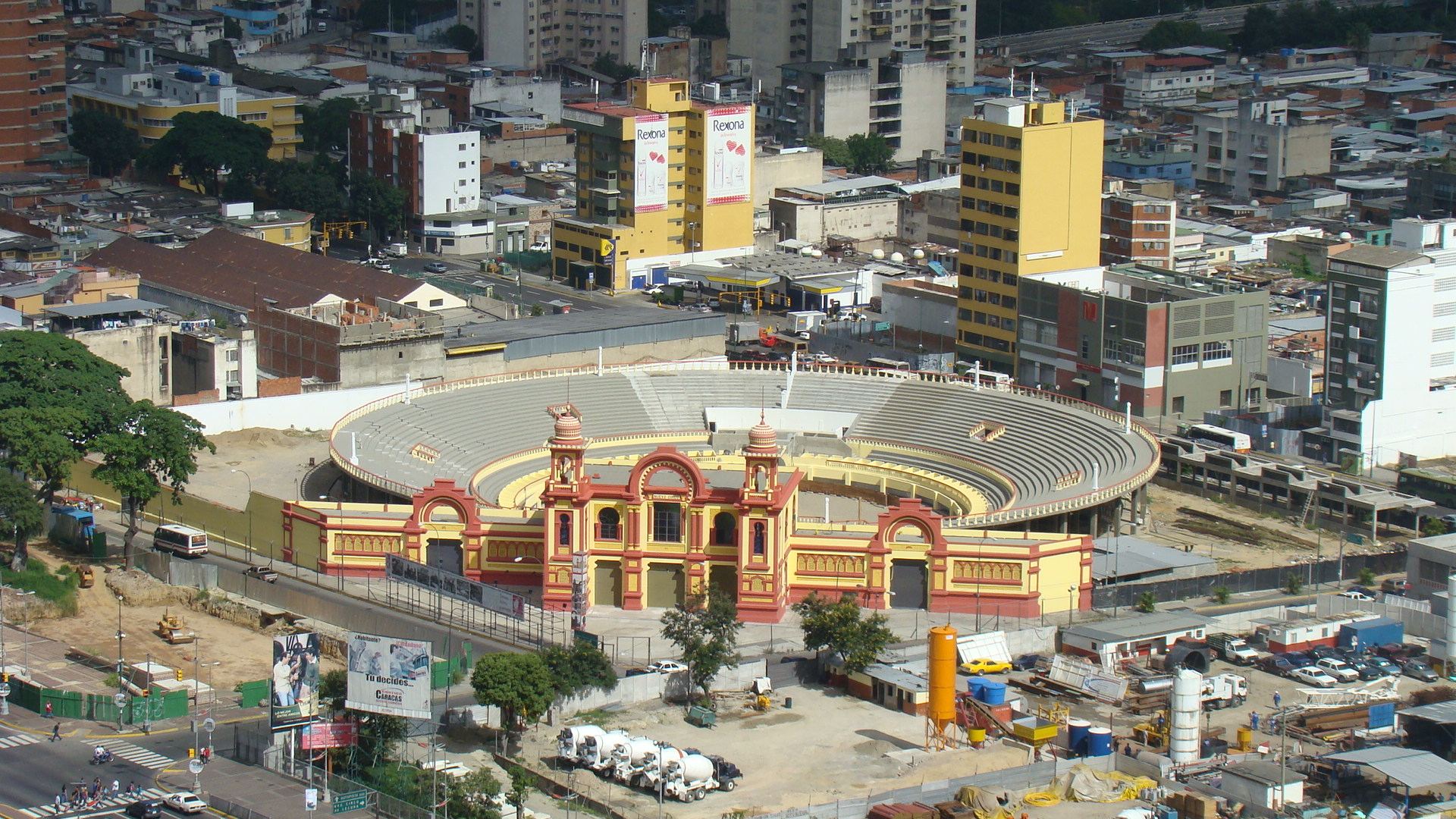
The Nuevo Circo de Caracas former bullring.

World War II was now gripping the world, but not Spain, which chose to sit this new war out. Even though Chicuelo had cut off a tail in Seville a year earlier, in the 1940 season, he did not perform at the Maestranza bullring owing to financial differences with the company. He travelled to Latin America, returning to Venezuela specifically, performing three afternoons at the Nuevo Circo de Caracas: on 14 January, alongside Antonio García "Maravilla" in a mano a mano, fighting bulls from the Marquis of Villamarta ranch; on 21 January, with Joaquín Rodríguez "Cagancho" and José Ignacio Sánchez Mejías, who received the alternativa from "Chicuelo" (considered invalid in Spain; bulls from the Rosalía Surga cattle ranch were fought); on 28 January, bulls from the Don Felipe Bartolomé ranch were fought by the matadors Chicuelo, José Ignacio Sánchez Mejías, and Jaime Pericás.

The 1941 season brought ten corridas Chicuelo's way, and the 1942 season brought 14. The press-sponsored bullfights in Seville on 4 June 1942 saw him once again claim two ears and a tail. The bulls were from the Carlos Núñez ranch, and he shared the billing with Manuel Álvarez "El Andaluz" and Antonio Bienvenida. In 1943, he only saw three corridas and once more had financial differences with the company at the Maestranza bullring, and so he did not appear there that year, the award of a tail there at one of the last year's appearances notwithstanding.

The 1944 bullfighting season saw Chicuelo appear at seven corridas, but he chose to cut his season short in the wake of his twelve-year-old son's death, and indeed, he did not return to bullfighting until 1948.

=== Later career ===
After four years away from the bullrings, Chicuelo reappeared in 1948. In hometown Seville on 15 August, he earned a lap round the ring after a fight with bulls from the Villamarta ranch, and also stood as "godfather" as the Portuguese novillero Manolo Dos Santos took his alternativa. The third bullfighter on the bill that afternoon was Manuel Álvarez "El Andaluz".

After one unremarkable corrida in his hometown in 1949, and none at all in 1950, Chicuelo fought at three corridas in 1951. The most notable is 29 July. The bulls were laid on by the Alipio Pérez Tabernero ranch, and Chicuelo's fellow bullfighters that afternoon were the Mexican Carlos Arruza and fellow Sevillian Manolo González. Chicuelo was awarded a lap round the ring and two ears from the bull Canastillo ("Little Basket"). Prior to the corrida, Chicuelo's retirement had been announced, though not by Chicuelo. Who had announced the retirement was unclear, and Chicuelo did not endorse it.

In Utrera on 1 November 1951, Chicuelo appeared to grant Juan Doblado and Juan Pareja Obregón their alternativas, but he did not fight any bulls himself.

Chicuelo's last professional appearance in public was in his hometown on 30 September 1952. It was a homage to Rafael "El Gallo". The Pinohermoso, Escobar, J. Cossío, Osborne, Esteban González, Juan Cobaleda, Concha y Sierra, Graciliano P. T., and Montalvo ranches each contributed one bull for the festivities, and the bullfighters were Ángel Peralta (rejoneador), Joaquín Pareja Obregón (rejoneador), Manuel Jiménez Chicuelo, Domingo Ortega, Rafael "Gallito", Manolo Dos Santos, Juan Silveti, César Girón, and Curro Galisteo.

== Personal life and death ==
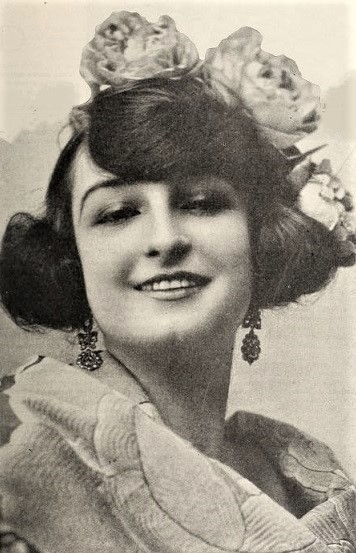
"Dora"

Chicuelo married the cupletista Dolores Castro Ruiz, known professionally as "Dora la Cordobesita", and informally as "Dora", in Córdoba on 10 November 1927. The wedding was held at Córdoba's Parish Church of the Sorrows. Chicuelo's and Dora's first meeting had taken place in 1921, but until three years later they still had not made their relationship "official", but in the end did at the Feast of Corpus Christi in Granada. He lived for many years in the neighbourhood around Seville's Alameda de Hércules.

Chicuelo and Dora had seven children, one of whom, Rafael Jiménez Castro ("Chicuelo-III"; "Chicuelo Hijo"; born 1937), was likewise a bullfighter, and another of whom, Manuel Jiménez Castro, was a novillero and a subalterno.

In the earlier half of the 1940s, their son Juanito (Juan Jiménez Castro) drowned in the River Guadalquivir at María Trifulca Beach.

He was the most mischievous, the most likeable, the one who had the most friends in La Alameda. The master, skilled in cheating death, a man from head to toe, silently cried his sorrow at the chalet door. In his right hand he held a bundle of clothes tied with a belt… Juanito's friends, who brought the bad news, looked sadly at the bullfighter, not daring to speak. It was an August night…

Not only was Chicuelo Roman Catholic, but he also belonged to a Catholic brotherhood in Seville known as the Pontificia y Real Hermandad y Cofradía de Nazarenos de Nuestro Padre Jesús del Gran Poder y María Santísima del Mayor Dolor y Traspaso ("Pontifical and Royal Brotherhood and Confraternity of Nazarenes of Our Father Jesus of the Great Power and the Most Holy Mary of the Greatest Sorrow and Trespass"), or Gran Poder ("Great Power") for short. Quite a number of bullfighters have been members. The brotherhood's roots go back to 1431, and it has been influential enough to figure in the city's history over the last several centuries. Its headquarters are at the Basílica de Jesús del Gran Poder ("Basilica of Jesus of the Great Power"), which stands at the Plaza de San Lorenzo in Seville.

Dora died on 26 April 1965 at the age of 62 of a "cerebral thrombosis". Chicuelo thus spent his last couple of years as a widower. He died in Seville on 31 October 1967 at the age of 65.

== Chicuelina ==
The chicuelina (Spanish: [tʃikweˈlina]) is a bullfighting move performed with the cape (not the muleta). It is performed by addressing the bull from the front, holding the cape with both arms open and in a half-extended position. When the bull charges, the bullfighter does a half turn on himself in the opposite direction to the bull's charge, so that his body is wrapped by the cape, with the animal passing by on one side. This pass owes its name to this article's subject, the Sevillian bullfighter Manuel Jiménez, whose nickname "Chicuelo" is the source. He was also the first to perform the manoeuvre, at the Valencia bullring in 1924, although his recognition spread after he performed it during a pass in the Plaza de las Ventas in Madrid in 1925. A variation is the so-called chicuelina al paso or galleo por chicuelinas, in which the bullfighter performs the pass several times in a row while walking, to direct the bull towards a particular spot in the bullring.

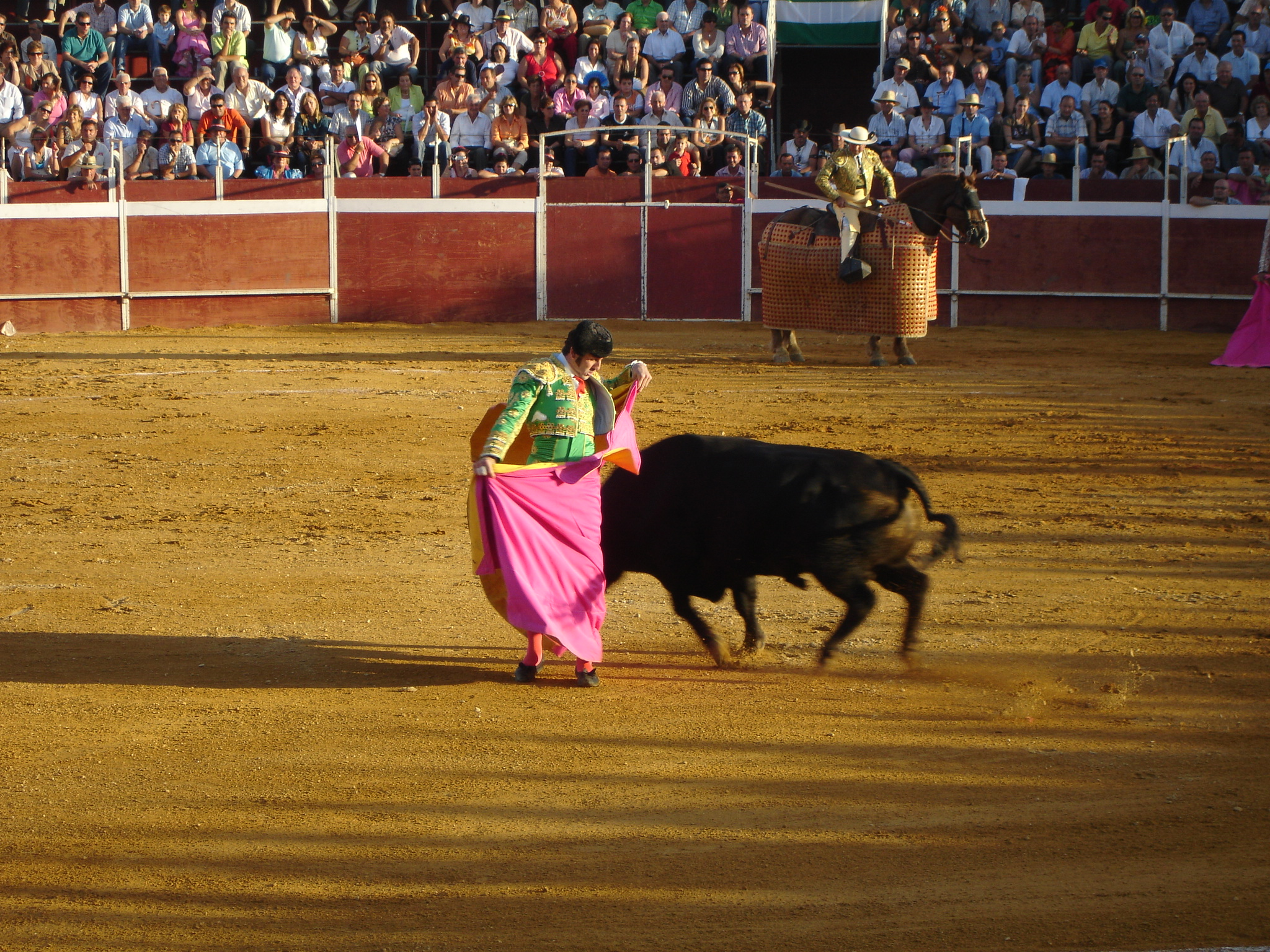
Juan José Padilla executes a chicuelina.

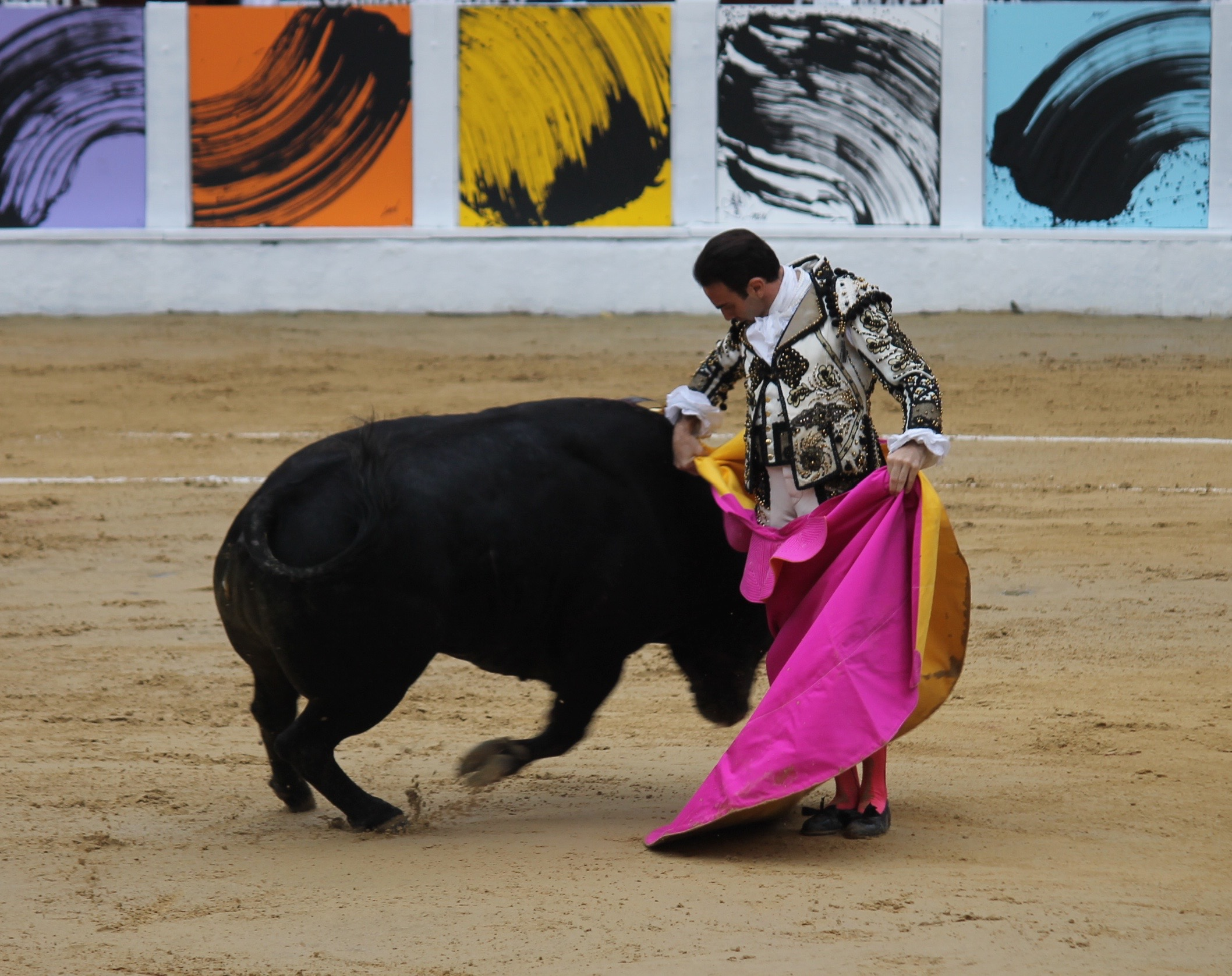
Enrique Ponce executes a chicuelina.

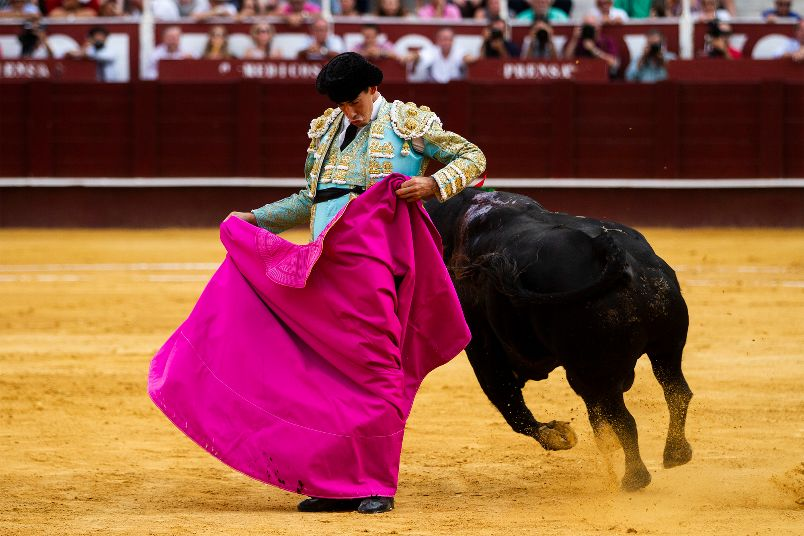
Saúl Jiménez Fortes executes a chicuelina.

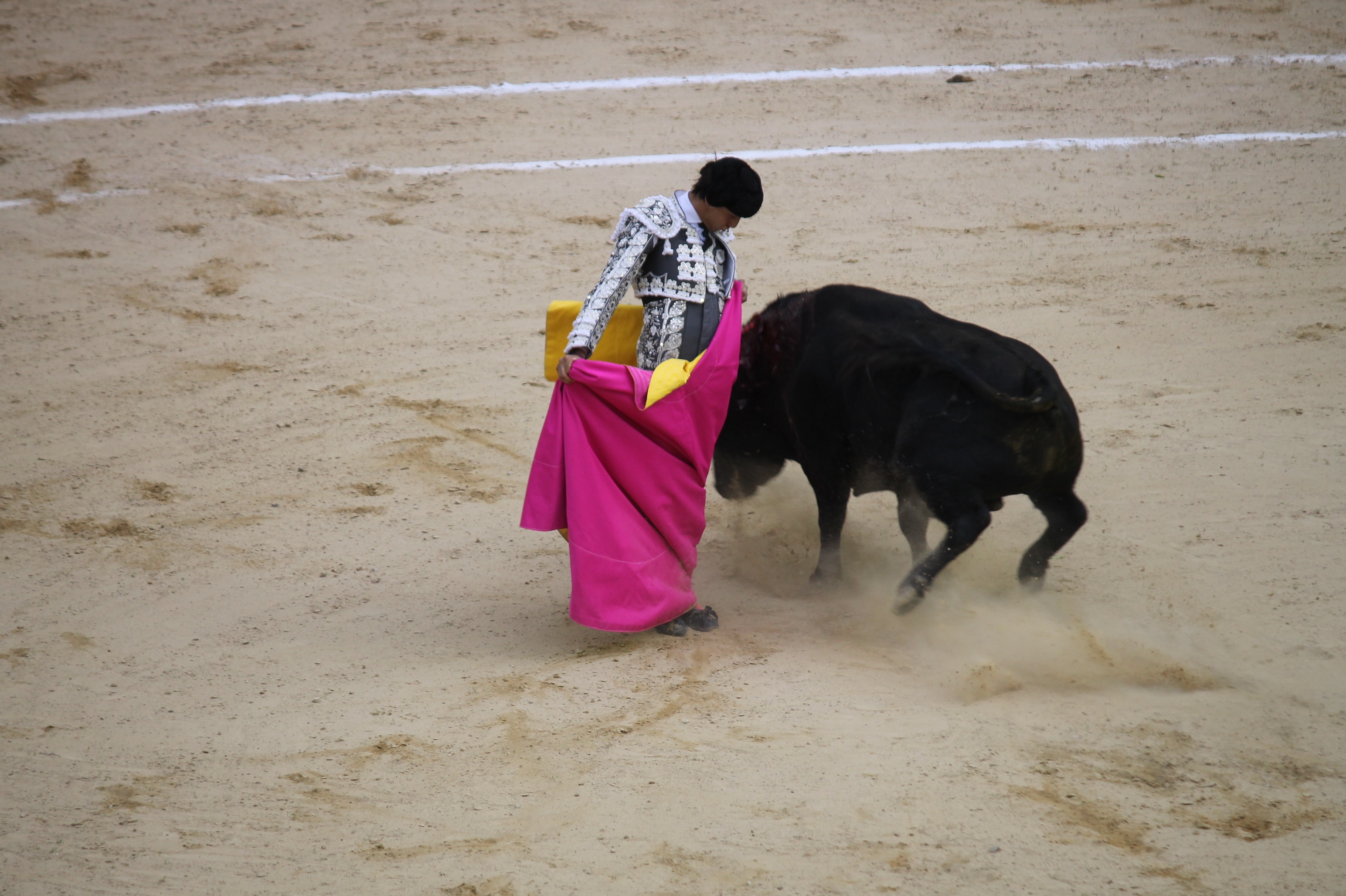
Roca Rey executes a chicuelina.

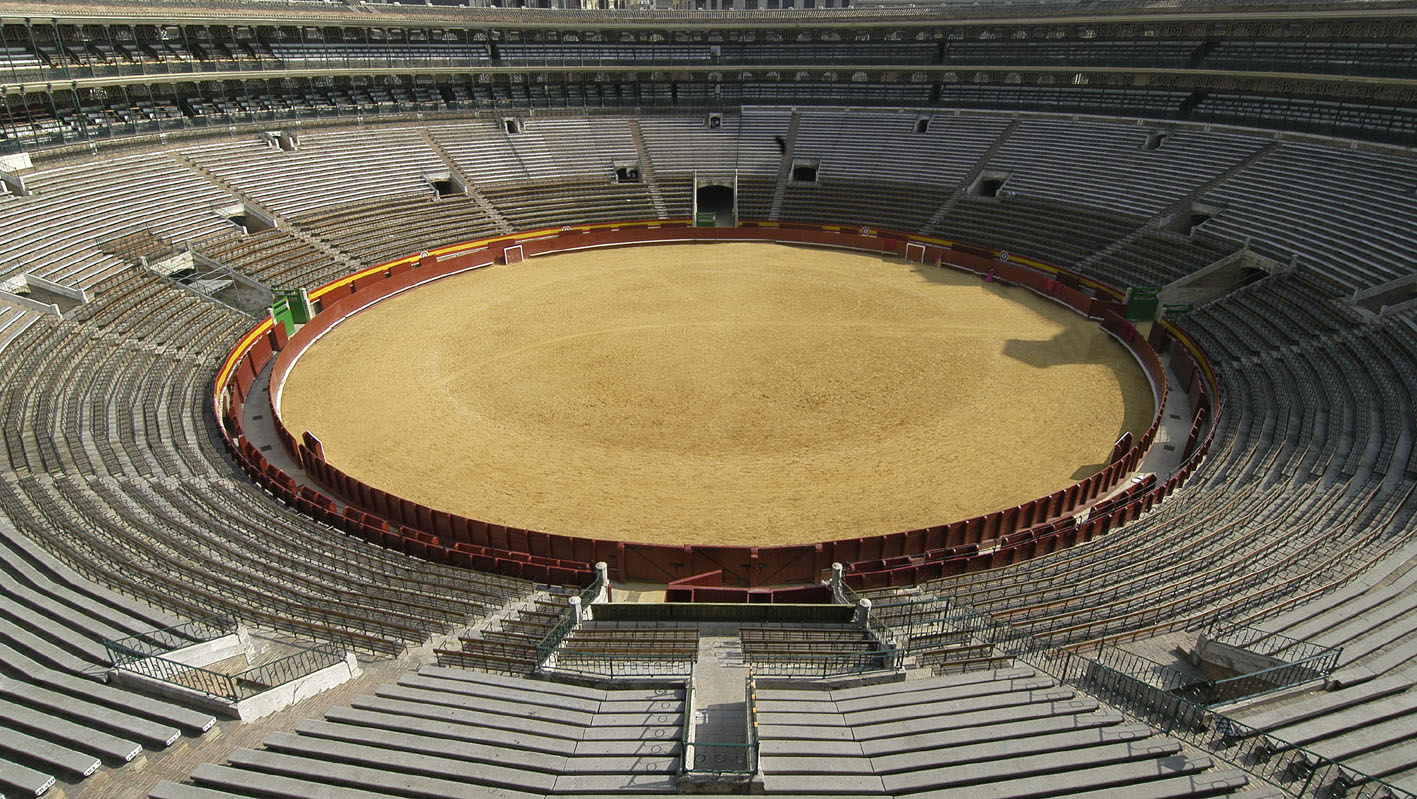
The scene of Chicuelo's first chicuelina in Valencia

== Tributes ==
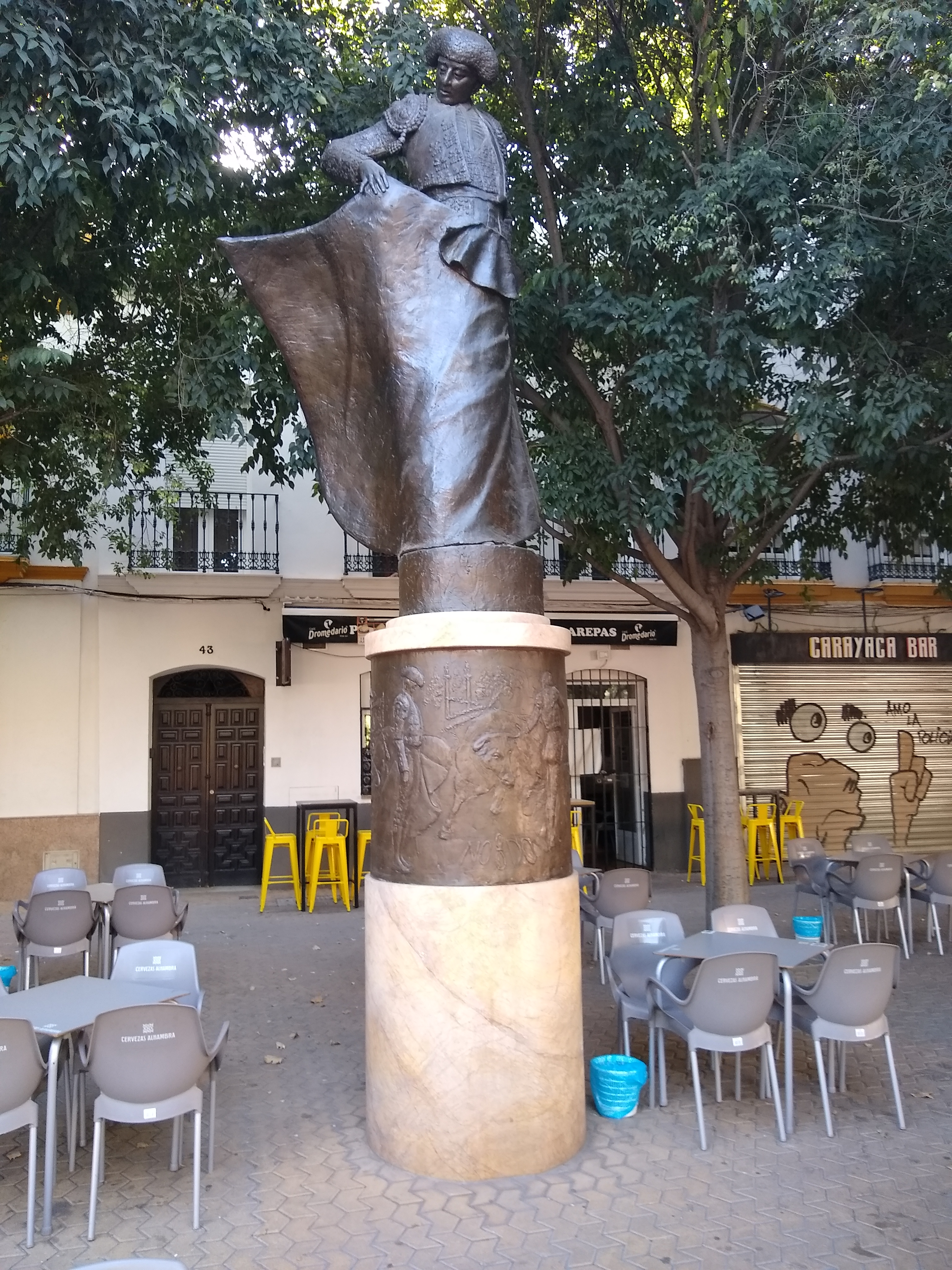
Sculpture on Alameda de Hércules; position: 37°24′2.8″N 5°59′37.8″W

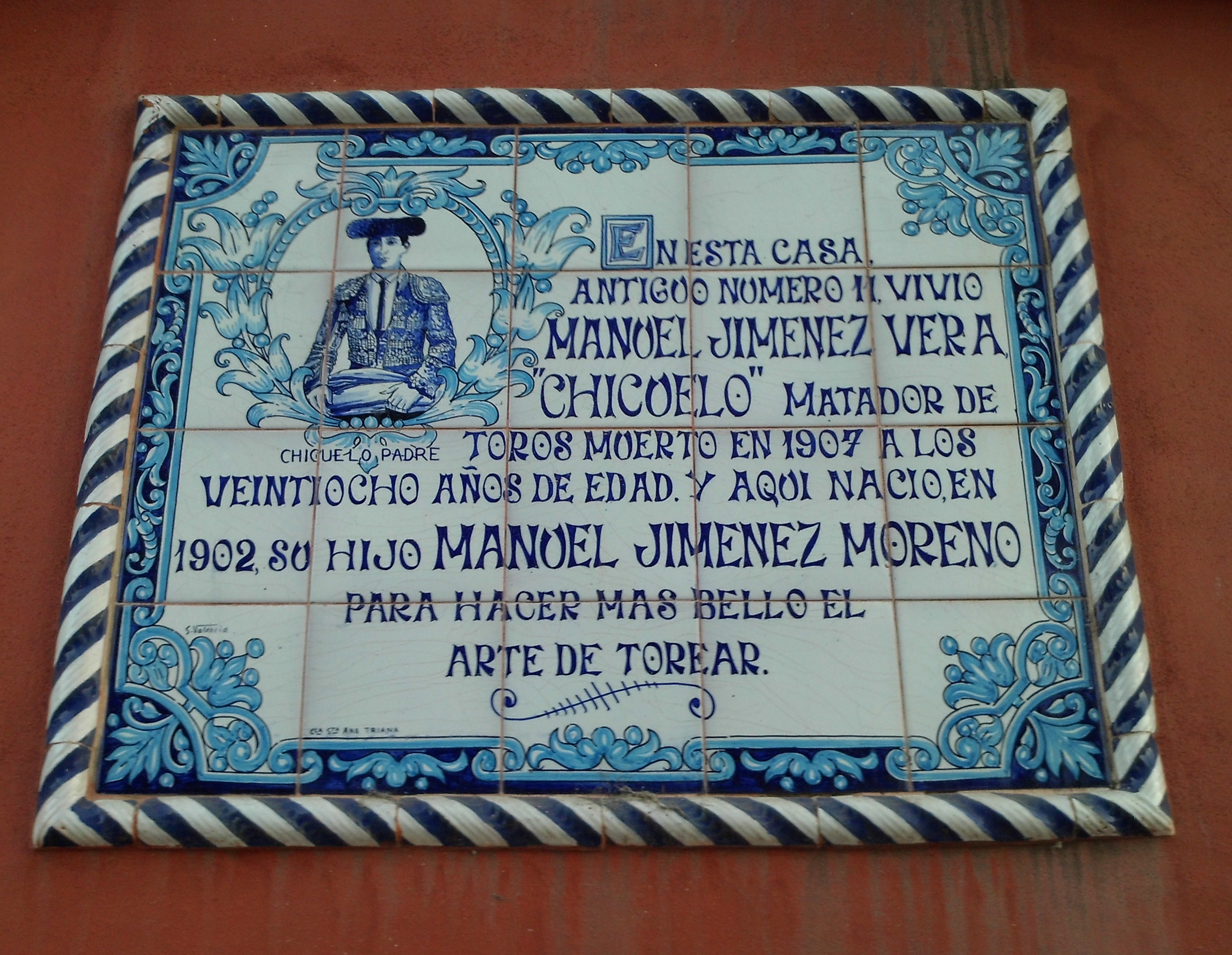
Azulejo commemorating both Chicuelo and his father (who also used the nickname Chicuelo); position: 37°23′2.2″N 6°0′1.8″W

On 21 July 2009, Seville's mayor, Alfredo Sánchez Monteseirín, unveiled a bronze sculpture in Chicuelo's honour on the city's Alameda de Hércules measuring almost six metres tall counting the pedestal. Unsurprisingly, it shows him performing the move named after him: the chicuelina. Attending the ceremony were several bullfighting luminaries from Seville, including Curro Romero. Also on hand was the sculptor himself, Alberto Germán Franco, from Huelva. "I have made Chicuelo doing the chicuelina as only he knew how," he said, "because there are many ways to do them, but the position he took was explained to me by the members of the commission, as well as his son Rafael."

At the Monumental in Mexico City, Chicuelo has been immortalized in a statue that likewise shows him performing the chicuelina. Unlike the sculpture in Seville, however, this one includes a bull. The sculptor who created it was Alfredo Just Gimeno, and it can be found at the east end of Calle de Alberto Balderas (19°22′56.8″N 99°10′44.5″W).

In 1973, the current fairgrounds where the Seville Fair is held were established on land that was formerly part of the Guadalquivir's riverbed, after the fair had been held since its beginnings at Saint Sebastian's Meadow (Prado de San Sebastián). A new street grid was laid out at the new site, and the streets were each named after famous bullfighters from Seville; one of the north-south streets has been named Calle Manuel Jiménez "Chicuelo".

There is one other tribute in Seville to Chicuelo – and his father, too – at the former's birthplace, Calle Betis 30 (formerly 11 at the time of his birth). It is an azulejo, a ceramic plaque of sorts using blue glaze for images and text. Chicuelo was born, the azulejo says, "to make the art of bullfighting more beautiful".

== In literature ==
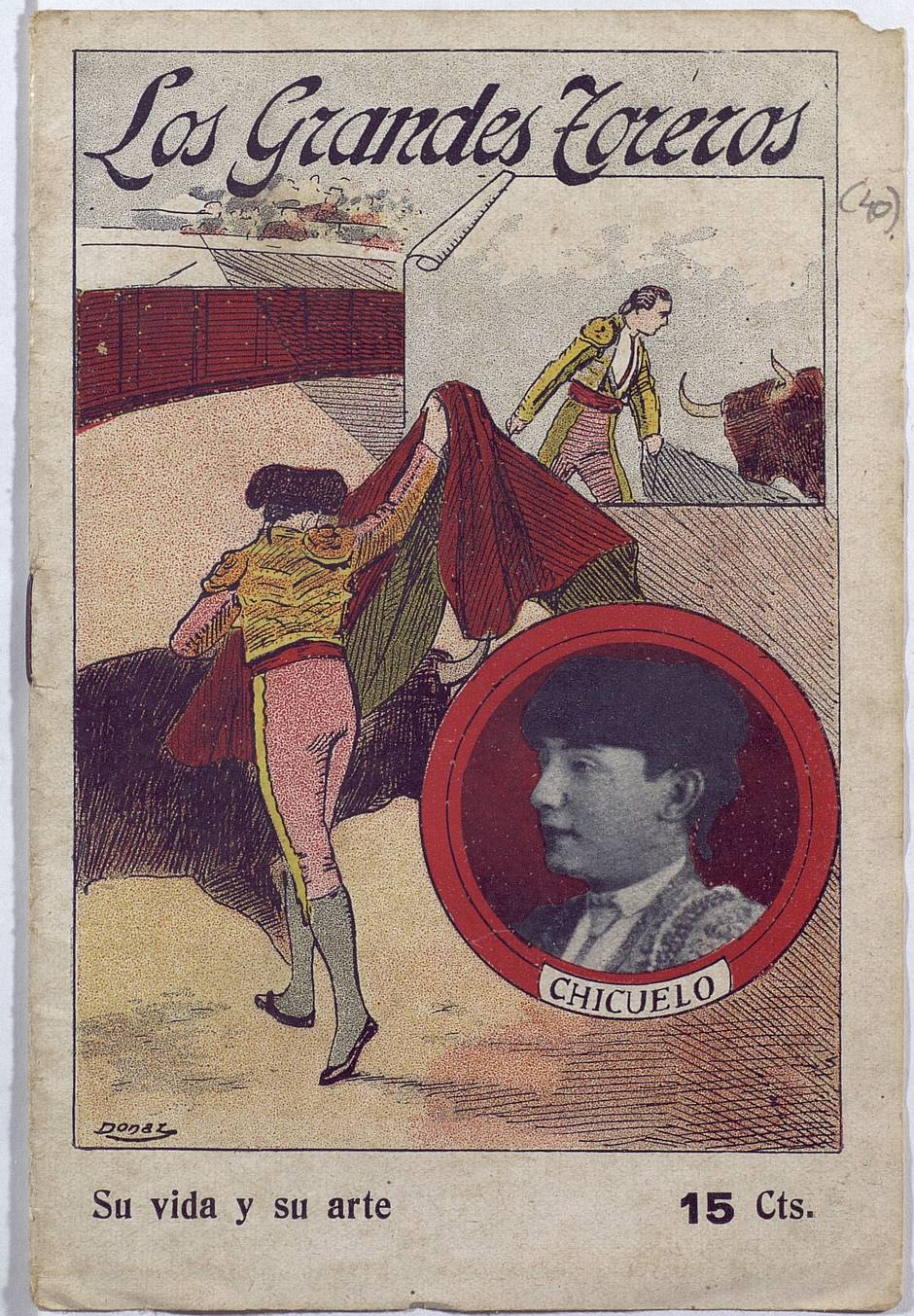
Edition from the Los Grandes Toreros series about Chicuelo.

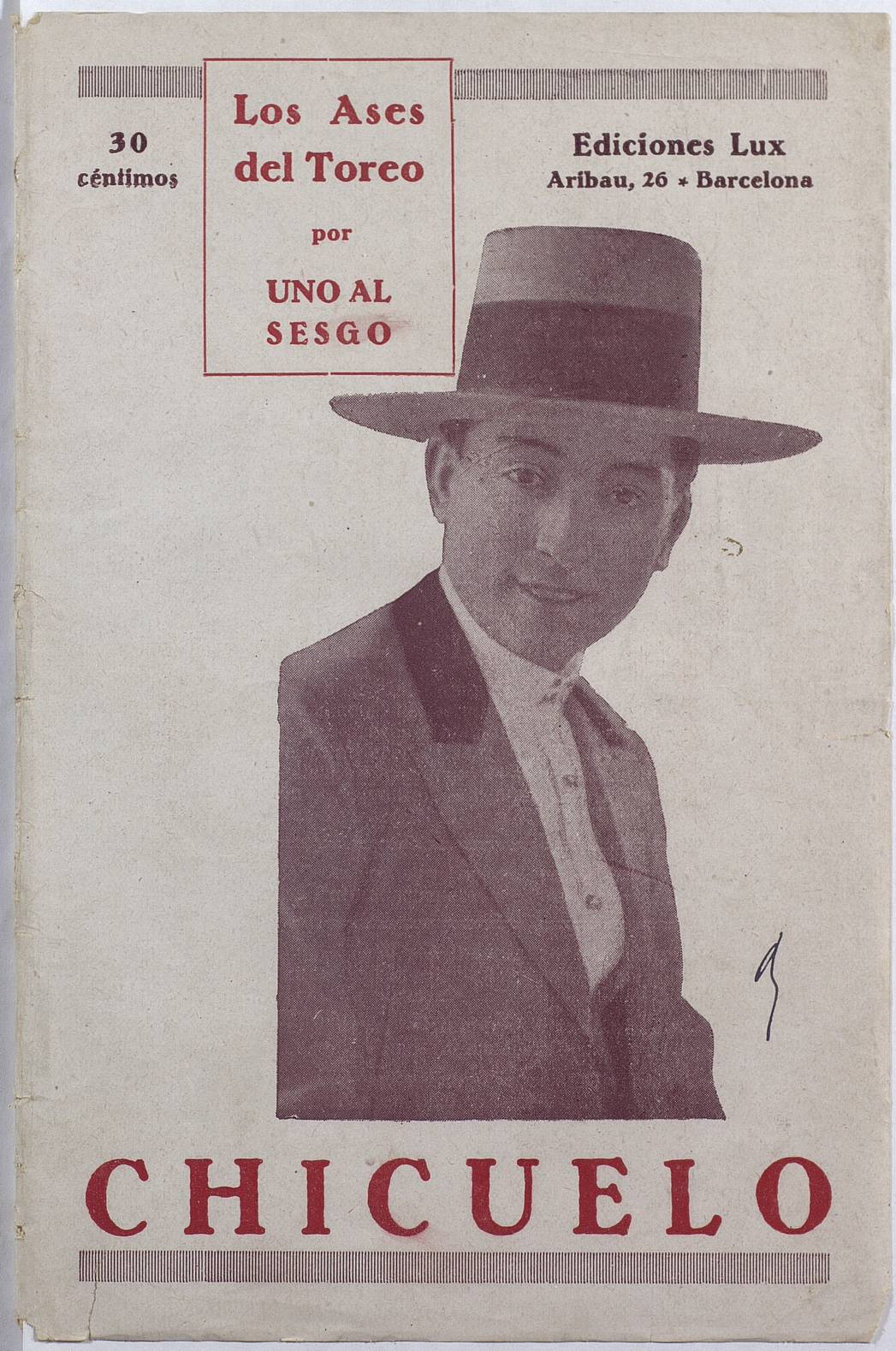
Edition from the Los ases del toreo series about Chicuelo.

Some minor literature, mainly biographical in its orientation, was published about Chicuelo in the 1920s, as witnessed by the two flanking images of booklet covers in this section (neither of which is as long as 30 pages), but he later received major literary attention from a prominent writer. Chicuelo was one of the many bullfighters whom Ernest Hemingway mentioned in his 1932 non-fiction book Death in the Afternoon. Whatever the azulejo on Calle Betis may say about the man who was born there, Hemingway had the following things to say about him — things that are rather at odds with how others remember him (see next section):

Chicuelo was the son of a matador of that same name who had been dead some years from tuberculosis. He was reared, trained and launched and managed as a matador by his uncle, Zocato, who had been a banderillero of the old school and was a good business man and a heavy drinker. Chicuelo was short, unhealthily plump, without a chin, with a bad complexion, tiny hands and with the long eyelashes of a girl. Trained in Sevilla and then on the ranches around Salamanca he was as perfect a miniature bullfighter as could be manufactured and he was about as authentic a bullfighter, really, as a little porcelain statuette.

Chicuelo was wonderful until he was first touched by a bull. Then, utterly cowardly if the bull offered any difficulties, he was good about twice a year thereafter, only giving all his repertoire when he found a bull without any bad ideas that would move past him without deviation as though it were mounted on rails. In between the beauty of his performances with the mechanically perfect bull that he awaited all season, and his occasional, nerved up, good, scientific work with a difficult bull came some of the saddest exhibitions of cowardice and shamelessness it would be possible to see.

Hemingway also saw Chicuelo as having a "feeble, whipped look".

== Impact on bullfighting ==
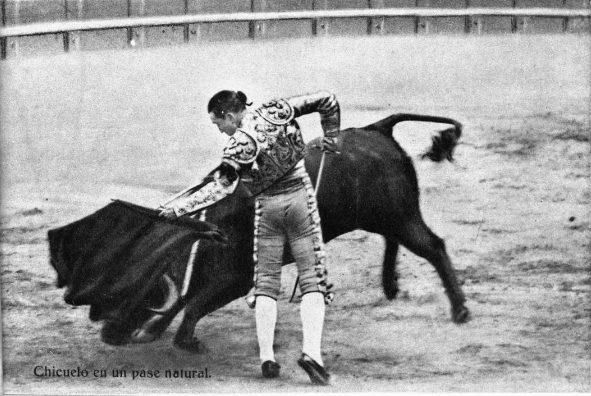
Chicuelo performing one of the naturales that he linked together, something that Nieto found unusual for the time.

Luis Nieto, the Spanish writer and bullfighting critic, had a few particular things to say about what Manuel Jiménez Moreno "Chicuelo" did for bullfighting as it is known today. This is an excerpt:

Chicuelo represents an essential link in Sevillian bullfighting. He is linked to the brilliant Juan Belmonte. And if the man from Triana (Belmonte) shortens the terrain, the man from Alameda (Jiménez) provides the link. In Madrid he amazed the bull Corchaíto in his bullfight, linking together several naturales (a kind of pass); something unusual in bullfighting until then. Within what is understood by the Sevillian school, bullfighting with naturalness and grace, not lacking in depth, Chicuelo was a forerunner of the same. Graceful with the cape, his bullfights with the muleta were marked by harmony. And he is one of the bullfighters who mark the new direction of bullfighting, in which the hand is lowered on the muleta to achieve greater control and aesthetics. Rafael Chicuelo explains that his father "has been the most artistic bullfighter I have known. In addition to the chicuelina, he also introduced the pass from the side and the delantal. But above all, with his bullfighting with his feet together, he is the forerunner of the Sevillian school. At the Maestranza he cut off up to five tails. From 1919 to 1931 he fought several bullfights each season in Seville. He should have a monument to him." His artistic dimension was so great that the following sevillanas were sung: El arte del toreo vino del cielo/ y en la tierra su mejor intérprete lo es/ Manuel Jiménez Chicuelo. (The art of bullfighting came from heaven/ and on earth its best interpreter is/ Manuel Jiménez Chicuelo.)

The rest is accessible (in Spanish) through "External links" below.

At least one critic at the time, Federico M. Alcázar, considered Chicuelo's performance with the bull Corchaíto "the greatest faena in bullfighting". Writing originally in the newspaper El Imparcial, Alcázar used notably hyperbolic language in describing Chicuelo's various moves and the crowd's reactions thereto, and concluded his piece thus:

It has been the work of a god, of an enlightened one, of a sublime and brilliant madman…. Hail, Chicuelo! Hail to your sovereign art! When everything is erased and lost in the history of bullfighting, that faena will remain as a memorable summit, which will raise its solitary peak to infinity.

That afternoon in Madrid, when Chicuelo fought Corchaíto, the groundwork was laid for a new kind of bullfighting that had never before been seen.

Ignacio de Cossío Pérez de Mendoza, a writer who has written a great deal on the subject of bullfighting, has been not so much hyperbolic as analytical in his diction, but nonetheless clearly sees Chicuelo as a founder of the style of bullfighting seen in the world's bullrings today:

It only took him eight afternoons, in which he alternated with Gallito, to capture better than anyone of his generation that innovative, linked and encyclopaedic bullfighting on the one hand; and on the opposite horn, shortening distances when the occasion called for it, on the other. Joselito already said it after an afternoon shared in Écija: "Chicuelo is the most dangerous bullfighter I have ever known." Without knowing it, on that afternoon in Madrid he laid the foundations of a new bullfighting never seen before. Each of the twenty muletazos he recited he linked with another, converting the constant attacks of the bull into five series finished with chest passes, ornaments and hand changes with both hands. From that faena de muleta with those masterful naturales linked in a circle without changing position, he entered into a new artistic and circular dimension. From then on, all his colleagues imitated him, like his godson Manolete, and they still do today. Chicuelo is, by his own merits, the architect of modern bullfighting and represents the personified fusion of the eternal bullfighting of José and Juan. His work is the greatest contribution to bullfighting that has ever existed or will ever exist. From that afternoon onwards, the bull was chosen more towards that type of modern bullfighting and even years later the peto (padding for the picador's horse) would be imposed to transform an art of blood and fire into that celebration of pure science that Chicuelo knew so well. It may be the case that more bullfighters appear with a different interpretation and personality in the style of bullfighting, but the fundamental bullfighting technique invented by Chicuelo has hardly changed.
