= Gómez Ortega =

Gómez Ortega is a surname. Notable people with the surname include:

- Casimiro Gómez Ortega (1741–1818), Spanish physician and botanist
- José Gómez Ortega (1895–1920), Spanish bullfighter
- Rafael Gómez Ortega (1882–1960), Spanish bullfighter, brother of José
