= Ignacio Sánchez Mejías =

Spanish bullfighter

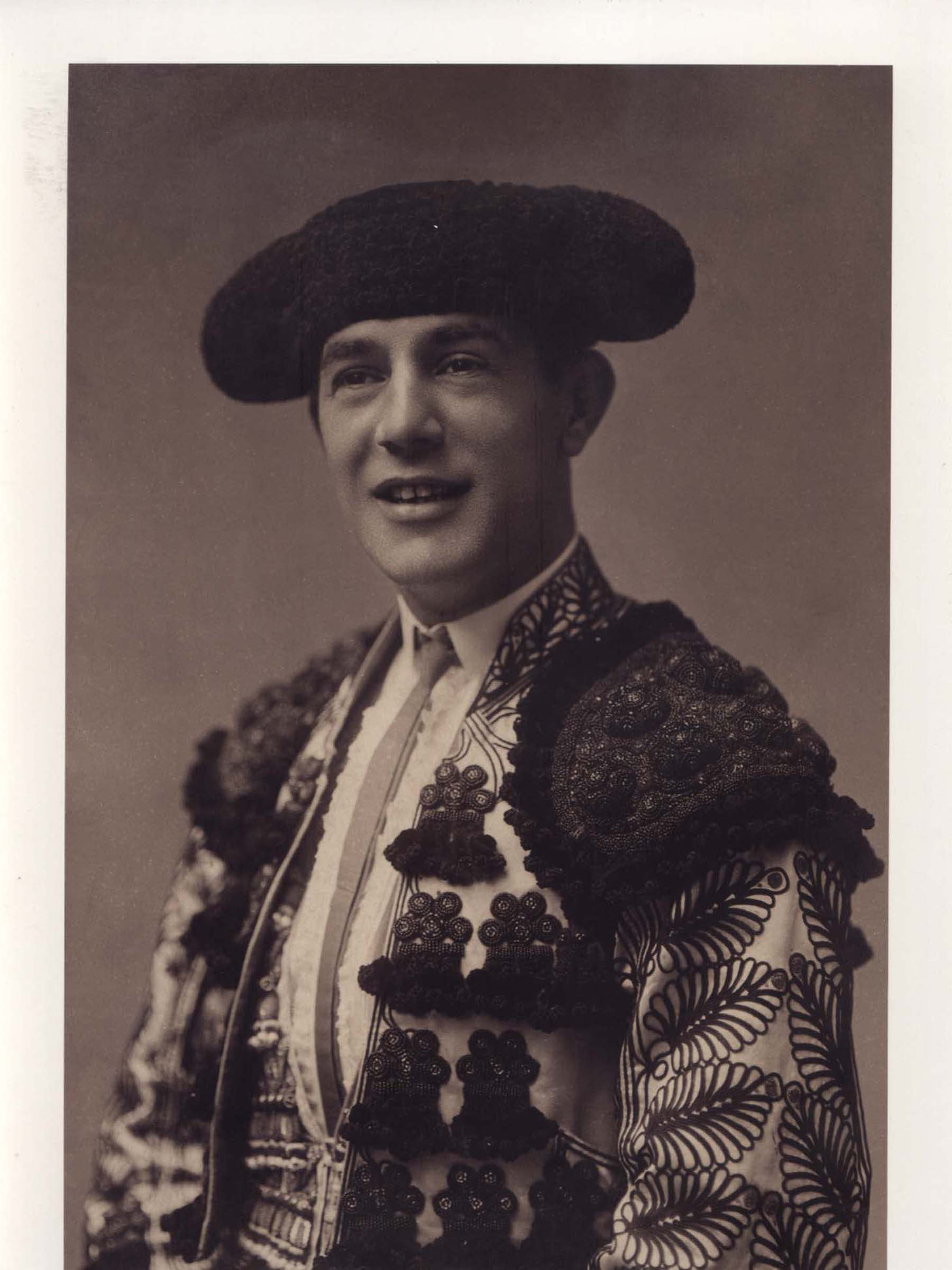
- Born: June 6, 1891; Sevilla, Provincia de Sevilla, Andalucia, Spain
- Died: August 13, 1934 (aged 43); Sevilla, Provincia de Sevilla, Andalucia, Spain

Ignacio Sánchez Mejías (6 June 1891, Seville – 13 August 1934, Madrid) was a Spanish matador.

After his death following a goring (cornada) in the Plaza of Manzanares, he was memorialized by several poets of the Generation of '27, notably by Federico García Lorca in his Llanto por Ignacio Sánchez Mejías ("Lament for Ignacio Sánchez Mejías", sometimes translated under the title "Lament for the Death of a Bullfighter").

== Early life ==
Sánchez Mejías was born in 1891 in the Calle de la Palma, Seville, to a wealthy doctor. During the 1910s he became close friends with future bullfighter José "Joselito" Gómez, who later became his brother-in-law. During his teen years he stowed away on a ship bound for North America, where in 1910 he debuted as a banderillero in Morelia.

== Matador de toros ==
Back in Spain, he appeared in Madrid in September 1913, and on 21 June 1914 in his native Seville, where he received a goring that broke his femur and delayed his career for years.

Sánchez Mejías made his Spanish debut in Madrid 1919 he made his debut in Barcelona with Joselito and Juan Belmonte Garcia. His alternativa was confirmed in Madrid in April 1920. He appeared in more than 100 fights in 1920, though two additional gorings prevented him from making all planned appearances.

On 16 May 1920 Sánchez Mejías was alternating with Joselito in Talavera when his brother-in-law was gored. Sánchez Mejías killed the bull while Joselito was taken to the infirmary, where he later died. A photograph of Sánchez Mejías watching over the corpse that night became famous in its own right.

== Retirement ==
Sánchez Mejías retired from bullfighting in 1927. In the 1928-1929 academic year, he enrolled at the "La Rábida" Secondary Education Institute in Huelva, at the age of thirty-eight, to finish his Bachelor's degree studies. On May 25, 1928, he was elected the 12th president of Real Betis Balompié, remaining in office until September 2, 1929. He also became a patron of the future Generation of '27, some of whose members were true fans of bullfighting and bullfighting experts.

== Return to bullfighting ==
In 1934 Sánchez Mejías returned to bullfighting. In August of that year he replaced Domingo Ortega in Manzanares, where he was gored in the right thigh. He would not allow the local doctor to operate on him, asking instead to be returned to Madrid. He was transported there by ambulance. Two days later, he contracted gangrene and died.

== Legacy ==
A street in Feria de Abril, Sevilla, bears his name. He has been the subject of a number of documentaries.

In 1926 the Valencian sculptor Mariano Benlliure included him in a memorial statue, where he is pictured among the figures carrying the coffin of Joselito. The statue resides in a mausoleum in the Cementerio de San Fernando in Seville. Ignacio Sánchez Mejías is buried in the same cemetery.

== See also ==
- Café Gijón (Madrid)

== Sources ==
- (in Spanish) Andrés Amorós, Ignacio Sánchez Mejías. Alianza Editorial, 1998. ISBN 84-206-3857-9
