= Rafael Gómez Ortega =

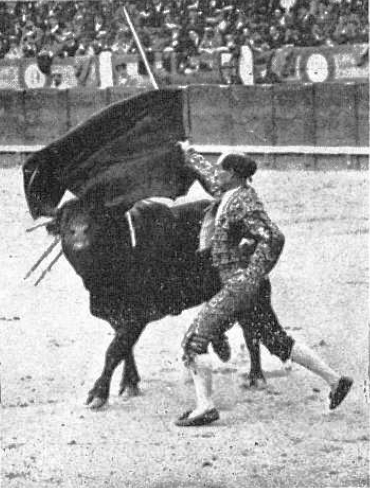
- Rafael Gómez "Gallito" Ortega in a "monumental pass" given to his first bullfight on October 8, 1912 in Madrid
- Born: June 16, 1882; Madrid, Spain
- Died: May 25, 1960 (aged 77); Seville, Spain
- Resting place: Cemetery of San Fernando, Spain
- Other names: Gallito, El Gallo (The Rooster) and Divine Bald
- Occupation: bullfighter
- Spouse: Pastora Imperio (m. 1911; div. 1912)
- Parents: Fernando Gómez García (father); Gabriela Ortega Feria (mother)
- Relatives: José Gómez Ortega (brother) and Fernando Gómez Ortega (brother)
- Family: Familia Gallo

Rafael Gómez Ortega, (1882 – 1960) also known as El Gallo ("the rooster"), was an early twentieth century bullfighter. He came from a family of famous bullfighters, including his father Fernando Gómez García, and younger brother José Gómez Ortega. He is today remembered for several of his unique fighting techniques, such as the espantada ("sudden flight"), which simply consisted of fleeing when the bull entered the ring, and fighting bulls from a chair.

Ortega's fights were considered amusing to audiences and he was brought out of retirement seven times because of this "sportsmanship". He finally retired on October 4, 1936. Commentators found that his intermittent fear of the bulls was characteristic of his style, noting that he was often brave when it suited him and gave in to panic when it did not.

Ortega later wasted the fortune he had made in the ring and was financially supported by fellow bullfighter Juan Belmonte. He was briefly married to Pastora Imperio, a famous flamenco dancer.

Ortega died on 25 May 1960 at the age of 77.
