= José Gómez Ortega =

Spanish bullfighter (1895-1920)

Joselito
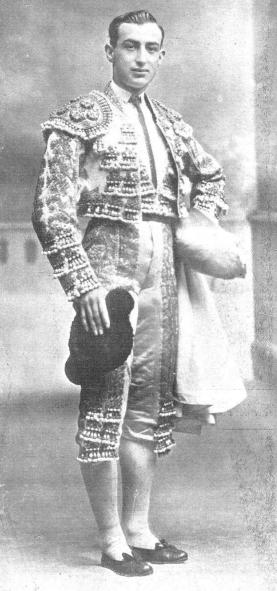

Personal information
- Nickname(s): Gallito; Joselito el Gallo
- Born: José Gómez Ortega; 8 May 1895 Gelves, Andalucia, Spain
- Died: 16 May 1920 (aged 25) Talavera de la Reina, Spain

Sport
- Sport: Bullfighting
- Rank: Matador
- Relatives: Fernando Gómez García; Rafael Gómez Ortega; Ignacio Sánchez Mejías

6 Toros por Gallito (1914)

José Gómez Ortega (8 May 1895 – 16 May 1920), commonly known as Joselito (Spanish pronunciation: [xoseˈlito]), was a Spanish matador in the early twentieth century.

Younger brother of matador de toros Rafael Gómez Ortega ("El Gallo"), Joselito was considered a child prodigy and was the youngest bullfighter to receive the title of matador de toros, at the age of 17, with his brother as "padrino".

Joselito followed in archrival Juan Belmonte's footsteps and the two ushered in bullfighting's "Golden Age" during the second decade of the 20th century. Joselito and Belmonte are widely considered to be among the most famous bullfighters of all time, and their professional rivalry did not prevent their developing a close personal friendship.

Joselito was fatally gored in the ring by the bull "Bailador" ("Dancer") in Talavera de la Reina at the age of 25, where he was appearing with the matador Ignacio Sánchez Mejías. Upon Joselito's death, the Virgin of Hope of Macarena was dressed in an entirely black ensemble to acknowledge the public's heavy grief.

== Biography ==
=== Early life ===
José Gómez Ortega was born on 8 May 1895 in Huerta de El Algarrobo, Gelves (Andalusia, Spain) to Fernando Gómez García, a bullfighter, and Gabriela Ortega Feria, a flamenco singer.

Joselito was a third-generation bullfighter. His father Fernando Gómez García, known as El Gallo (The Rooster) - Joselito's previous nickname, Gallito, was a diminutive form of this nickname; His elder brother Rafael Gómez Ortega, was also a bullfighter known as El Gallo.
