= Juan Belmonte =

Spanish bullfighter (1892–1962)

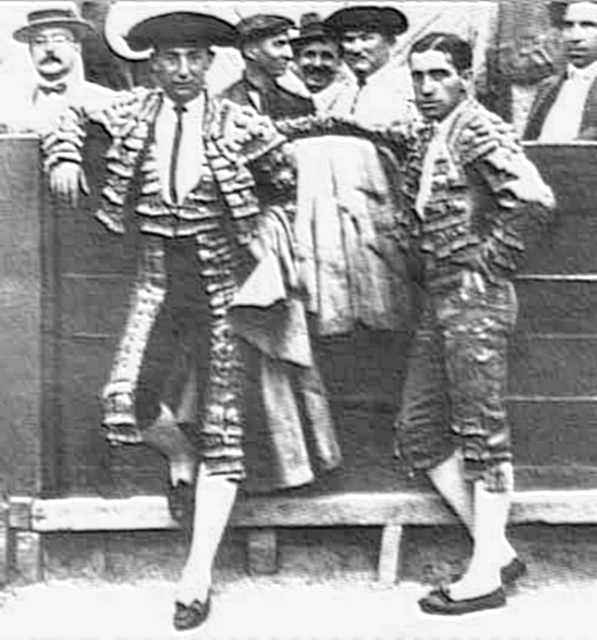
- Joselito and Belmonte

Personal information
- Nickname: El Pasmo de Triana
- Born: Juan Belmonte García; 14 April 1892 Seville, Andalusia, Spain
- Died: 8 April 1962 (aged 69) Utrera, Andalusia, Spain

Sport
- Sport: Bullfighting
- Position: Matador

Bullfighting career
- Début novillero: 21 July 1912; Sevilla, Andalusia, Spain

Juan Belmonte García (14 April 1892 – 8 April 1962) was a Spanish bullfighter. He fought in a record number of bull fights and was responsible for changing the art of bullfighting. He had minor deformities in his legs which forced him to design new techniques and styles of bullfighting.

== Life ==
Born in Seville, his family moved to the Triana neighbourhood when he was three, according to the biographer A. Diaz Canabate. Belmonte began his bullfighting career in 1908, touring around Spain in a children's bullfighting group called Los Niños Sevillanos. He killed his first bull on 24 July 1910. As an adult, his technique was unlike that of previous matadors; he stood erect and nearly motionless, and always stayed within inches of the bull, unlike previous matadors, who stayed far from the animal to avoid the horns. As a result of this daring technique, Belmonte was frequently gored, sustaining many serious wounds.

One such incident occurred during a November 1927 bullfight in Barcelona, Spain. Belmonte was gored through his chest and pinned against a wall. Several other toreros rescued him. Among the spectators that day were the King and Queen of Spain and the Infanta Beatriz.

Belmonte's rivalry with José Gómez Ortega (a.k.a. Joselito or Gallito), another contender for the appellation "greatest matador of all time", from 1914 to 1920 is known as the Golden Age of Bullfighting. The era was cut short when Joselito was fatally gored on 16 May 1920, at the age of 25, at a bullfight in Talavera de la Reina, a small town not far from Madrid. Belmonte then had to carry alone the weight of the whole bullfighting establishment, which proved to be unbearable, and which in 1922 led to the first of his three temporary retirements.

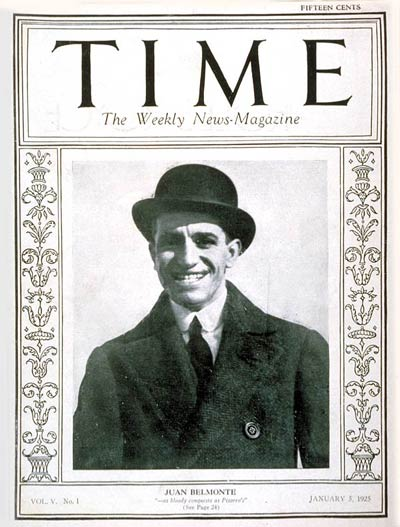
Belmonte on cover of Time magazine, 5 January 1925

In 1919, Belmonte fought 109 bullfights (corridas), a number unmatched by any matador before, until the 1965 bullfight season when Manuel Benítez Pérez ("El Cordobés") performed in 111 corridas, surpassing Belmonte's record. The Mexican matador Carlos Arruza fought 108 corridas in one season but it is said that he refused to pass Belmonte's record out of respect for the maestro.

After his third and final retirement in 1935, Belmonte moved to a 3,500-acre (1400 ha) ranch in Andalusia, where he "lived the life of a gentleman bull-breeder". He also published a (ghostwritten) autobiography. Written by Manuel Chaves Nogales and published in 1937, it was called Juan Belmonte, matador de toros: su vida y sus hazañas (Juan Belmonte, killer of bulls: his life and deeds) and consisted of his story as told to Nogales. The book was translated into English by Leslie Charteris as Juan Belmonte, Killer of Bulls. Belmonte was also a close friend of authors Henry de Montherlant and Ernest Hemingway, and he appears in two of Hemingway's books: Death in the Afternoon and The Sun Also Rises. Like Hemingway, Belmonte committed suicide by gunshot.

Juan Belmonte was the single matador that changed the style of bullfighting. Born with slightly deformed legs, he could not run or jump like other boys and so when he finally began his career as a matador, he firmly planted his feet on the ground, never giving way. He forced the bull to go around him, whereas others until then had jumped almost constantly like circus performers.

During his bullfighting career he received 24 serious wounds and 'countless minor ones'. He later developed a grave heart condition, identified by a Madrid specialist who advised him to 'go easy' and to stop riding, an instruction that he initially took to heart but, in the last spring of his life, disobeyed in order to ride his favourite horse, Maravilla, on the ranch with his son. Shortly before his death he learned that he had lung cancer. After a final morning ride, he returned home to his ranch house, took his 6.35mm pistol from a drawer in his study and shot himself. He died within a week of his 70th birthday. Berman and Wallace suggest that this may have been a 'copycat suicide'; on hearing of his friend Hemingway's suicide in 1961, Belmonte is said to have answered 'Well done.'

The circumstances surrounding his death are the source of some controversy. A popular version, described in Life, has Belmonte's doctor telling him that, because of his lifelong injuries and trauma, he could no longer smoke cigars, ride his horses, drink wine or perform sexual acts with women. He decided he was ready to die, had his favourite horse be brought to him, took a handful of cigars, two bottles of his favourite wine, and rode out to his finca.

A film about his life, Belmonte, was released in 1995.

He is interred at the cemetery of Seville, 18 m from the grave of his rival of seven seasons, Joselito. His wish was to be buried in the robe of his Holy Week fraternity.

== In popular culture ==
Belmonte appears as a character in Woody Allen's 2011 film Midnight in Paris as a friend of Ernest Hemingway, who considers him to be "truly brave". He is portrayed by Swedish actor Daniel Lundh.

Ernest Hemingway features Belmonte in Death in the Afternoon and as a minor character in The Sun Also Rises.

He is also mentioned in Shadows Over Loathing

Awards and achievements
Preceded by Charles Evans Hughes	Cover of Time Magazine; 5 January 1925	Succeeded by Prince Albert, Duke of York
