= 1960 in aviation =

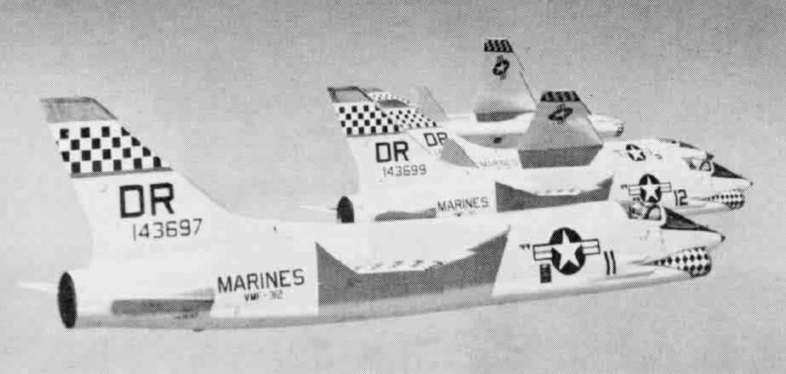
Four Vought F8U-1 Crusader of U.S. Marine Corps Fighter Squadron 312 (VMF-312) "Checkerboards" in flight, 1960

This is a list of aviation-related events from 1960.

== Events ==
- Evergreen Helicopters is founded. It later will become Evergreen International Aviation.
- Switzerland′s Aircraft Accident Investigation Bureau begins operations.
- Summer – The United States Navy antisubmarine aircraft carrier USS Wasp (CVS-18) is stationed off the west coast of Africa to cover the evacuation of American nationals from Congo (Kinshasa).

=== January ===
- Transocean Air Lines ceases operations. It will enter bankruptcy later in 1960.
- January 1
  - Fiji Airways is reconstituted, becoming equally owned by BOAC, Qantas, and Tasman Empire Airways.
  - Aerlínte Éireann, a branch of Aer Lingus operating transatlantic flights, is incorporated into Aer Lingus and takes the name Aer Lingus – Irish International Airlines.
- January 6 – A dynamite bomb explodes aboard National Airlines Flight 2511, a Douglas DC-6B, in mid-air over Bolivia, North Carolina, and the aircraft crashes. All 34 people on board die, including retired United States Navy vice admiral and Medal of Honor recipient Edward Orrick McDonnell. Julian Frank is suspected of being the suicide bomber.
- January 18 – Capital Airlines Flight 20, a Vickers 745D Viscount, suffers the loss of all four engines due to icing and crashes into a farm near Holdcroft, Virginia, killing all 50 people on board.
- January 19
  - The Scandinavian Airlines System Sud Aviation Caravelle Orm Viking (tail number OY-KRB), operating as Flight 871, crashes on approach to Esenboğa International Airport outside Ankara, Turkey, killing all 42 people on board. It is the first fatal crash of a Caravelle.
  - A United States Navy P4M-1Q JQ-16 Mercator of Fleet Air Reconnaissance Squadron 2 (VQ-2) crashes while en route to Adana Air Base in Turkey, killing all 16 members of its crew. The Royal Air Force Mountain Rescue Team based at Nicosia, Cyprus, recovers the bodies of 12 crew members before being forced to leave the recovery of the remaining bodies and body parts until the spring.
- January 21 – Avianca Flight 671, a Lockheed L-1049E Super Constellation, crashes and burns on landing at Montego Bay, Jamaica, killing 37 of the 46 people on board. Among the dead is Thomas C. Capeheart, the son of United States Senator Homer E. Capehart. It is the deadliest aviation accident in Jamaican history.

=== February ===
- February 9 – The United States Air Force opens its National Space Surveillance Control Center at Bedford, Massachusetts.
- February 13 – France detonates its first nuclear weapon.
- February 25 – A United States Navy Douglas R6D-1 carrying members of the United States Navy Band to Brazil to perform at a diplomatic reception attended by President of the United States Dwight D. Eisenhower and a Real Transportes Aéreos Douglas DC-3 collide in mid-air 1,600 meters (5,249 feet) over Guanabara Bay close to the Sugarloaf Mountain in Rio de Janeiro, Brazil. The accident kills 35 of the 38 people aboard the R6D and all 26 people on board the DC-3.
- February 26 – Alitalia Flight 618, a Douglas DC-7C en route from Rome to New York, crashes into a cemetery at Shannon, Ireland, shortly after takeoff, killing 34 of the 52 persons on board.

=== March ===
- Lufthansa begins jet service between Frankfurt-am-Main and New York City, using Boeing 707s.
- Pakistan International Airlines wet-leases a Boeing 707 from Pan American World Airways, becoming the second Asian airline (after Air India) to incorporate jet aircraft into its fleet.
- The Vertol Aircraft Corporation is renamed Boeing Vertol.
- March 10 – The last flight by a United States Air Force-operated North American B-25 Mitchell takes place, when TB-25J-25-NC 44-30854, the last Mitchell in the U.S. Air Force inventory, lands at Eglin Air Force Base, Florida, for preservation.
- March 15 – The world's first supersonic bomber, the Convair B-58 Hustler, enters operational service with the U.S. Air Force. The first deliveries are to the 43rd Bombardment Wing at Carswell Air Force Base, Texas.
- March 17 – Northwest Orient Airlines Flight 710, a Lockheed L-188 Electra, disintegrates in mid-air near Cannelton, Indiana, killing all 63 people on board, after metal fatigue causes its right wing to separate at an altitude of 18,000 feet (5,486 m) . Among the dead is Central Intelligence Agency training commander Chiyoki Ikeda.
- March 18 – A Northwest Orient Airlines Boeing 377 Stratocruiser makes a 300-foot (91-meter) emergency dive to avoid colliding with two Air National Guard jets over Lansing, Michigan. Among the passengers is Morris Chalfen, producer of the Holiday on Ice skating shows, whose wife and three children had died the previous day on Northwest Orient Airlines Flight 710.
- March 24 – Flying at the Soviet Union′s Sternberg Astronomical Institute in Moscow, a Tupolev Tu-114 (NATO reporting name "Cleat") airliner piloted by Captain B. Timochuk sets a world speed record for a turboprop landplane over a 1,000-km (621-mile) closed circuit carrying a payload of 25,000 kg (55,116 pounds) or less, averaging 871.38 km/h (541.45 mph).

=== April ===
- Royal Air Maroc takes delivery of its first jet aircraft, a Sud Aviation Caravelle.
- April 1
  - Flying at the Soviet Union′s Sternberg Point Observatory, the Tupolev Tu-114 (NATO reporting name "Cleat") airliner 76459 piloted by Ivan Sukhomlin and copiloted by N. Kharitonov sets a world speed record for a turboprop landplane over a 2,000-km (1,242-mile) closed circuit carrying a payload of 25,000 kg (55,115 pounds) or less, averaging 857.277 km/h (532.687 mph).
  - Iraqi Airways, previously a department of the Iraqi State Railways, becomes fully independent of the railroad company.
  - The New York State Commission Against Discrimination faults Capital Airlines for failing to hire an African-American woman, Patricia Banks, despite her meeting all job requirements. Because of the ruling, she becomes one of only two African American flight attendants in the United States.
- April 6 – The British Short SC.1 VTOL research aircraft makes its first transition from vertical to horizontal flight and back, flying from Belfast Harbour Airport.
- April 9 – Flying at the Soviet Union's Sternberg Point Observatory, the Tupolev Tu-114 (NATO reporting name "Cleat") airliner 76459 piloted by Ivan Sukhomlin and copiloted by Konstantin Sapelkin sets a world speed record for a turboprop landplane over a 5,000-km (3,105-mile) closed circuit carrying a payload of 25,000 kg (55,115 pounds) or less, averaging 857.212 km/h (532.647 mph).
- April 10 – BOAC resumes scheduled air service from London to Cairo (Egypt), suspended in October 1956 at the time of the Suez Crisis.
- April 12 – After a Cubana de Aviación Vickers Viscount arrives with 16 passengers aboard at Miami International Airport in Miami, Florida, at the end of a flight from Havana, Cuba, one of its passengers and its entire crew of three demand political asylum in the United States.
- April 13 – The United Kingdom terminates ballistic missile research, preferring to simply purchase the U.S.-developed GAM-87 Skybolt missile.
- April 14 – A Thai C-54 Skymaster crashes into Mount Wu Tse after takeoff from Taipei, Taiwan. Eighteen people die, including the chief of the Air Force of Thailand, Air Marshal Chalermkiat Watanangura, and his wife.
- April 20–21 – German-born American pilot Peter Gluckmann, dubbed "The Flying Watchmaker" by the press, attempts a new light-plane nonstop distance record, taking off from Hong Kong in a Beechcraft Bonanza for a solo flight to New York City with a flight path taking him over Japan and the Aleutian Islands. He encounters severe weather that forces him to abort the flight and land at Tokyo, Japan.
- April 27 – Peter Gluckmann takes off from Tokyo in a Beechcraft Bonanza with a revised flight plan for his light-plane distance record attempt that will take him across the Pacific Ocean over Hawaii and then to the continental United States, where he hopes to reach New York City, or at least to fly as far inland as possible before having to land. Eight hours after takeoff, he radios a United States Coast Guard cutter that his engine is failing. He is never heard from again, and no trace of him or his airplane is ever found.

=== May ===
- May 1 – The Soviet Union shoots down a Central Intelligence Agency Lockheed U-2 near Sverdlovsk and captures its pilot, Gary Powers.
- May 12 – A U.S. Air Force C-130 Hercules drops a record 35,000 lb (15,876 kg) by parachute.

=== June ===
- A Sud-Aviation Alouette III helicopter carrying seven people makes take-offs and landings on Mont Blanc in the French Alps at an altitude of 4,810 meters (15,780 feet), an unprecedented altitude for such activities by a helicopter.
- The first Fouga Magister aircraft assembled in Israel roll off the assembly line of a former glider manufacturing company, which simultaneously renames itself Israel Aircraft Industries.
- June 1 – Trans-Canada Air Lines begins transatlantic jet airliner service, operating Douglas DC-8 aircraft between Montreal, Quebec, Canada, and London, England.
- June 7 – A helium tank explodes and ruptures the fuel tanks of a United States Air Force BOMARC-A nuclear surface-to-air missile at McGuire Air Force Base, New Jersey, igniting a fire that destroys the missile and contaminates the area directly below and adjacent to it with radioactive material.
- June 9 – United Arab Airlines, the future EgyptAir, takes delivery of its first jet aircraft, a de Havilland Comet 4C.
- June 10 – Trans Australia Airlines suffers the first passenger fatalities in its 14-year history when its Flight 538, a Fokker F-27 Friendship 100, crashes into the sea while on final approach at night in fog to Mackay, Queensland, Australia, killing all 29 people on board. It remains tied with the 1950 Australian National Airways Douglas DC-4 crash as the deadliest civil aviation accident and second-deadliest aviation accident in Australian history.
- June 18 – The Government of Colombia establishes the Department of Civil Aeronautics. It is assigned specific technical and administrative duties to define aeronautic policy in Colombia.

=== July ===
- Fidel Castro dissolves Cuba's naval air arm.
- July 1
  - British United Airways is formed.
  - A Soviet Air Defense Forces MiG-19 (NATO reporting name "Farmer") shoots down a U.S. Air Force RB-47H Stratojet (s/n 53-4281) reconnaissance aircraft in international airspace with four of the crew killed and two captured by the Soviets.
  - The U.S. Navy commissions Fleet Tactical Support Squadron 40 (VRC-40) as its first carrier onboard delivery squadron.
- July 2 – Textron Inc. purchases Bell Aerosystems.
- July 5
  - Bell Aerosystems becomes Bell Aerospace Corporation.
  - Two copilots aboard a Cubana de Aviación Bristol Britannia 318 flying from Madrid, Spain, to Havana, Cuba, with 40 people on board pull guns on the pilot and force him to fly to Miami International Airport in Miami, Florida.
- July 9 – Sabena begins airlifting Belgian nationals out of Congo. Over the next three weeks, 25,711 will fly home.
- July 15 – Ethiopian Air Lines Flight 372, a Douglas C-47 Skytrain, crashes into a mountainside near Jimma, Ethiopia, killing one pilot and injuring the other 10 people on board. The aircraft is destroyed.
- July 17 – During a flight from Havana, Cuba, to Miami, Florida, with 56 people on board, the captain of a Cubana de Aviación Vickers Viscount draws a gun and forces the copilot to fly the airliner to Kingston, Jamaica, where he demands political asylum.
- July 19 – Aboard a Trans Australia Airlines Lockheed L-188 Electra flying from Sydney to Brisbane, Australia, with 43 passengers on board, a man pulls out a sawed-off rifle and demands to be flown to Singapore. The first officer smashes the man across the wrist with a fire hatchet; the rifle fires once through the airliner's ceiling, and the hijacker is overpowered. Two sticks of dynamite are found under his seat.
- July 28
  - On approach to Camagüey, Cuba, during a flight with 14 people on board scheduled to terminate in Havana, the captain of a Cubana de Aviación Douglas DC-3 draws a pistol and holds a security man and two other crew members at gunpoint. Two passengers then order the copilot out of the cockpit, and the captain flies the airliner to Miami, Florida, where he requests political asylum.
  - Capital Airlines and United Airlines announce that Capital will merge into United in the largest airline merger in history at the time. They will complete the merger in June 1961.

=== August ===
- August 16 – United States Air Force Captain Joseph Kittinger sets a world record for the highest parachute jump (102,200 ft or 31,150m) and longest parachute free-fall (84,700 ft or 25,815 m) while testing high-altitude parachute escape systems in Project Excelsior. The free-fall record will stand until November 1, 1962 and the altitude record until October 14, 2012.
- August 19 – On its third pass, a U.S. Air Force C-119 Flying Boxcar flying from Hickam Air Force Base in Hawaii recovers a data capsule from the satellite Discoverer 14 in mid-air over the Pacific Ocean 360 miles (580 km) southeast of Honolulu. It is the first successful recovery of film from an orbiting satellite and the first aerial recovery of an object returning from Earth orbit.
- August 21 – Two hijackers commandeer an Aeroflot airliner in the Soviet Union and demand to be flown out of the country. Security forces overpower them. One crew member is killed in the incident.
- August 29 – Making a second attempt to land at Dakar Yoff International Airport in Dakar, Senegal, in bad weather, Air France Flight 343, a Lockheed L-1049G Super Constellation (registration F-BHBC), crashes into the Atlantic Ocean in a rain squall 1.6 kilometers (1 mile) from the airport, killing all 63 people on board. French West African poet David Diop is among the dead.

=== September ===
- Northwest Orient Airlines introduces jet service between the continental United States and Hawaii, using Douglas DC-8s.
- September 5 – A United States Navy McDonnell F4H-1 Phantom II sets a world speed record over a 500-km (310.5-mi) closed-circuit course, averaging 1,216.78 mph (1,958.16 km/h).
- September 10 – NORAD carries out Operation Skyshield, testing American and Canadian radar systems.
- September 15 – Tasman Empire Airways retires its last flying boat from service.
- September 17 – East African Airways commences jet service with the DeHavilland Comet 4 between London, England, and Nairobi, Kenya.
- September 25 – A U.S. Navy F4H-1 Phantom II sets a world speed record over a 100-km (62.1-mi) closed-circuit course, averaging 1,390.21 mph (2,237.26 km/h).

=== October ===
- October 4 – Eastern Air Lines Flight 375, a Lockheed L-188 Electra, strikes a flock of common starlings on takeoff from Logan International Airport in Boston, Massachusetts, loses power in three engines, and crashes into Boston Harbor, killing 62 of the 72 people on board and seriously injuring nine of the 10 survivors. It is the deadliest bird strike in history.
- October 29
  - Ten minutes after Cubana de Aviación Flight 905, a Douglas DC-3 with 37 people on board, takes off from Havana, Cuba, for a domestic flight to Nueva Gerona, the copilot grabs the air marshal and orders the captain at gunpoint to fly to Kye West, Florida. The air marshal is shot to death during a struggle, and it becomes evident that a total of nine of the people aboard are involved in the hijacking. Upon arrival at Key West, all nine of them, as well as two other passengers, request political asylum.
  - A Curtiss C-46 Commando operated by Arctic Pacific on a charter flight carrying the California Polytechnic State University football team crashes on takeoff from Toledo Express Airport in Toledo, Ohio, killing 22 people, including 16 players, the team's student manager, and a team booster. Quarterback and future college head football coach Ted Tollner is among the survivors.
- October 31 – British European Airways retires the DC-3, its last piston-engined airliner operating from London-Heathrow, from scheduled passenger service.

=== November ===
- The same Sud-Aviation Alouette III helicopter that took off and landed at record altitudes on Mont Blanc in June sets new records for such activities by a helicopter, making take-offs and landings in the Himalayas at an altitude of 6,004 meters (19,698 feet) with a crew of two and a payload of 250 kg (551 lbs).
- November 7 – A Fairchild F-27A turboprop passenger plane, operated by the Ecuadoran national airline AREA Ecuador, strikes the dormant volcano Atacazo in bad weather while on approach to Mariscal Sucre International Airport in Quito, Ecuador, at the end of a domestic flight from Simón Bolívar International Airport, in Guayaquil. The crash, 16 kilometres (9.9 mi) south of Quito and 150 metres (492 ft) below the summit of Atacazo, kills all 37 people on board. At the time, it was the worst aerial crash in the history of Ecuador, the first and worst fatal loss of an F-27, and the first accident involving the then-recently opened Quito airport. The accident aircraft (msn. 1, reg. HC-ADV) was the first prototype of the Fairchild F-27, and had been sold to AREA Ecuador in 1959.
- November 15 – Scott Crossfield reaches Mach 2.97 in North American X-15 56-6671.

=== December ===
- The Royal Navy retires it last piston-engined fixed-wing aircraft, the Douglas Skyraider, from front-line service.
- December 6 – Brazil commissions its first aircraft carrier, Minas Gerais. She is the second Latin American aircraft carrier to enter service.
- December 8 – After five Cubans wishing to fly to the United States attempt to hijack a Cubana de Aviación airliner with 17 people on board during a domestic flight in Cuba from Cienfuegos to Havana, a gun battle breaks out in which one person is mortally wounded. The airliner crash-lands near Cienfuegos.
- December 14 – Aer Lingus takes delivery of three Boeing 720s, its first jet aircraft. They are also the first three jet airliners to be registered in the Republic of Ireland.
- December 15 – Middle East Airlines takes delivery of its first jet aircraft, a de Havilland Comet 4C. It later will acquire three more de Havilland Comet 4Cs.
- December 16 – The United Airlines Douglas DC-8 Mainliner Will Rogers, operating as Flight 826, and the Trans World Airlines Lockheed L-1049 Constellation Star of Sicily, operating as Flight 266, collide over New York City. The DC-8 crashes in Park Slope, Brooklyn, killing all 84 people on board, and the Constellation on Staten Island, killing all 44 people on board; six people on the ground also die.
- December 17
  - A U.S. Air Force Convair C-131D Samaritan crashes due to fuel contamination shortly after takeoff from Munich-Riem Airport in Munich, West Germany. It crashes in the Ludwigsvorstadt borough of downtown Munich, striking a crowded two-section Munich streetcar. All 20 people on the plane and 32 people on the ground die.
  - The visitor center at the Wright Brothers National Memorial in Kill Devil Hills, North Carolina, is dedicated on the 57th anniversary of the Wright Flyer′s first flight in 1903.
- December 20 – After delivering the last P5M-2 Marlin flying boat to the U.S. Navy, the Glenn L. Martin Company ceases the production of crewed aircraft.
- December 24 – The North American Air Defense Command (NORAD, later renamed the North American Aerospace Defense Command) continues the annual tradition begun by the U.S. Continental Air Defense Command in 1955 of reporting on Christmas Eve that it is tracking Santa Claus's sleigh, presenting the most elaborate "reporting" of its progress yet. This time, NORAD's northern command post at St. Hubert, Quebec, Canada, provides regular updates of a sleigh operated by "S. Claus" which is "undoubtedly friendly." During the evening, NORAD reports that the sleigh has made an emergency landing on the ice of Hudson Bay, where Royal Canadian Air Force (RCAF) interceptors discover Santa Claus bandaging his reindeer Dancer's front foot, after which the RCAF planes escort him when he resumes his journey.
- December 26 – Italian-born American airplane designer and manufacturer Giuseppe Bellanca dies of leukemia at the age of 74.

== First flights ==
=== January ===
- January 10 – Auster D.5
- January 13 – Canadair CL-41
- January 14 – Piper Cherokee
- January 19 – Convair CV-580 Super Convair

=== February ===
- February 5 – PZL TS-11 Iskra
- February 12 – Auster D.4 G-25-8
- February 29 – Beechcraft Baron Model 56

=== March ===
- March 29 – Tupolev Tu-124 (NATO reporting name "Cookpot")

=== April ===
- Antonov An-24 (NATO reporting name "Coke")
- April 19 – Grumman A2F-1, A-6 Intruder prototype

=== May ===
- May 9 – Auster D.6 G-25-10
- May 31 – Aeritalia G91T

=== June ===
- June 24 – Avro 748

=== July ===
- Cessna 185 Skywagon
- July 29 – Max Holste MH.260 Super Broussard

=== August ===
- August 29 – Westland Scout

=== October ===
- Dassault Mirage IIIC (production model)
- October 18 – Beriev Be-12 Tchaika (NATO reporting name "Mail")
- October 21
  - Hawker P.1127 (tethered flight; first untethered flight November 19)
  - Grumman W2F-1 Hawkeye
- October 25 – Boeing Vertol Model 107, predecessor to the CH-46 Sea Knight.

=== November ===
- Beechcraft Baron Model 56
- November 16 – Canadair CL-44
- November 16 – Procaer Cobra

=== December ===
- Agusta A.104 I-AGUM
- December 4 – Enstrom F-28
- December 6 – Sikorsky S-61L
- December 9 – DINFIA IA 38

== Entered service ==
=== March ===
- March 15 – Convair B-58 Hustler with the United States Air Force′s 43d Bombardment Wing

=== May ===
- May 15 – Convair 880 with Delta Air Lines

=== June ===
- June 29 – English Electric Lightning with the Royal Air Force's No. 74 Squadron at RAF Coltishall

== Retirements ==
=== July ===
- July 2 – Martin P4M Mercator by United States Navy Fleet Air Reconnaissance Squadron 1 (VQ-1)

=== September ===
- Westland Westminster

== Deadliest crash ==
The deadliest crash of this year was the 1960 New York mid-air collision, when a United Airlines McDonnell Douglas DC-8 collided with a TWA Lockheed L-1049 Super Constellation over New York City on 16 December, killing all 128 people aboard both aircraft, as well as six on the ground. At the time, it became the deadliest aviation disaster of all time. The deadliest single-aircraft crash was World Airways Flight 830, a chartered Douglas DC-6 carrying American overseas servicemen in Guam on 19 September, killing 80 of the 94 people on board.
