= Chicuelo =

Chicuelo may refer to:

- Chicuelo (bullfighter), Manuel Jiménez Moreno (1902–1967), Spanish bullfighter
- Chicuelo II, Manuel Jiménez Díaz (1929–1960), Spanish bullfighter
- Chicuelo (guitarist) (born 1968), Spanish Catalan flamenco guitarist
- Chicuelo, a horse that won the Tremont Stakes in 1940
