= Flight 671 =

Flight 671 may refer to:

- Avianca Flight 671, crashed on 21 January 1960
- Air Wisconsin Flight 671, mid-air collision on 29 June 1972
- Trans-Air Service Flight 671, engine failure on 31 March 1992
