= Chicuelo II =

Spanish bullfighter (1929–1960)

Manuel Jiménez Díaz
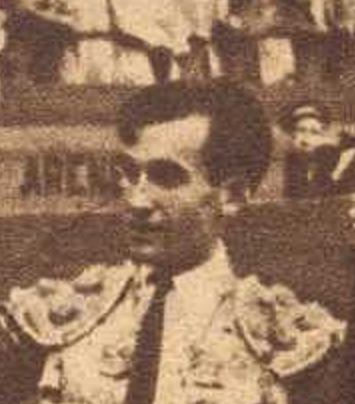
- Chicuelo II at Valencia while still a novillero

Personal information
- Nickname: Chicuelo II
- Nationality: Spanish
- Born: 16 June 1929 Iniesta, Spain
- Died: 21 January 1960 (aged 30) Montego Bay, Jamaica
- Resting place: Cementerio de Albacete; 39°00′38.2″N 1°50′57.1″W
- Monument: Sculpture outside Albacete bullring
- Home town: Albacete
- Occupation: Bullfighter
- Years active: 1945–1960
- Agent: Enrique Callejas (until 1956); Andrés Gago (by 1959) (apoderados)
- Parent: Benedicta Díaz (mother)
- Relative(s): Ángel Jiménez Díaz (brother); Ricardo Jiménez Díaz (brother); José Jiménez Díaz (brother); Esperanza Jiménez Díaz (sister); Ricardo Sevilla Jiménez "Chicuelo de Albacete" (nephew)

Manuel Jiménez Díaz (Spanish: [manˈwel xiˈmeneθ ˈðiaθ]; 16 June 1929 – 21 January 1960), known professionally as Chicuelo II (Spanish: [tʃiˈkwelo seˈɣundo]) was a Spanish bullfighter. Jiménez's life was cut short at the age of 30 when he was among those killed on Avianca Flight 671 on 21 January 1960 at Montego Bay. Despite any similarity in names – especially the professional name – Jiménez had no kinship with earlier bullfighters who bore the nickname "Chicuelo", such as Manuel Jiménez Vera or Manuel Jiménez Moreno. However, the later bullfighter Ricardo Sevilla Jiménez "Chicuelo de Albacete" (born 1963) is his nephew.

== Early life ==
Chicuelo II was born in a hamlet named Casa de la Viuda ("The Widow's House"), which lies within Iniesta's municipal limits. His parents were originally from Peñas de San Pedro in the Province of Albacete. The family eventually moved to that province's capital city, Albacete, and young Manuel was raised there. Having arrived at his new home at the age of seven, he began working at the local bazaar known as La Cocina ("The Kitchen"). It was not long before he found himself wanting to be a bullfighter like the ones that he admired, "Pedrés" and "Montero".

Chicuelo II's first steps into tauromachy were at the town slaughterhouse, in capeas (events at which bull calves or heifers are released into a ring and members of the public may interact with them), and at tentaderos (pens used at bull-breeding ranches to trial fighting bulls). This bullfighting apprenticeship led him to ride many kilometres on his bicycle through outlying towns, which proved quite a hard learning experience.

== Bullfighting career ==
Chicuelo II first donned the suit of lights in Las Pedroñeras in 1945, while still a teenager, giving an outstanding performance. He would, however, have to finish his military service before his name began to get around in bullfighting circles.

Chicuelo II made his début without picadores in his hometown, Albacete, in 1950. His début with picadores came on 24 June 1952 at the same bullring; he alternated with Fernando Jiménez and César Girón. He also appeared at a corrida in Barcelona on 19 September. His presentation at Las Ventas in Madrid was on 12 July 1953, when he alternated with Joaquín Rodríguez Sánchez "Cagancho hijo" and Carlos Corpas (or Corpa, according to another source). Bull calves were supplied by the José Tomás Frias (or Frías) ranch. Chicuelo II received an ovation and a lap of the arena for his efforts. This presentation was one of 49 novilladas (novice bullfights in which bull calves are used) that Chicuelo II fought in the 1953 season, and many aficionados noted that unlike the "genuine" Chicuelos, Chicuelo II showed what could be called excessive courage, even recklessness, even if, also unlike the "genuine" Chicuelos, he showed rather little in the way of an artistc approach to bullfighting.

Chicuelo II took his alternativa at the Valencia bullring on 24 October 1953. Standing as "godfather" on this occasion was Domingo Ortega, while Dámaso Gómez Díaz bore witness. The bull used for the ceremony was Palomito ("Little Dove") from the Doña Pilar Sánchez Cobaleda ranch.

In the wake of all his successes, Chicuelo II thought to go to Latin America, and later that same year he appeared at bullfights in Venezuela. Moreover, his alternativa was confirmed in Mexico. It was also during that sojourn in Mexico, though, that he was badly wounded by a bull from the Zotoluca ranch.

On 17 May 1954, Chicuelo II's alternativa was confirmed again at Las Ventas. Standing as "godfather" this time was Emilio Ortuño "Jumillano", while Pedro Martínez González "Pedrés" bore witness. The bulls were laid on by the Carlos Núñez ranch, and the one used for the ceremony was Acusón. His trophies that day were quite ample; he left two bulls earless and was borne shoulder-high out through the Great Gate.

He reaped even more substantial trophies at a bullfight in Cuenca on 5 September 1954, where he alternated with Antonio Bienvenida and Manolo Vázquez as they fought bulls from the Ángel Ligero ranch. This engagement brought him four ears, two tails, and three feet.

The 1955 bullfighting season was Chicuelo II's professional zenith, for it was in this year that he topped the escalafón taurino (bullfighters' rankings). His successes both in Madrid and elsewhere raised his profile and his popularity. He performed in 67 corridas that season.

Chicuelo II earned another trip out through the Great Gate at Las Ventas on 16 May 1957 after a corrida in which he had reaped two ears. On 31 May that same year, his participation at a bullfighting engagement in Cuenca was said to be "exceptional". He was sharing billing with Miguel Báez Espuny "El Litri" and Antonio Borrero Morano "Chamaco", a threesome known as "el trío del valor". This corrida was held on the occasion of the Coronation of Our Lady of Sorrows ("Coronación de la Virgen de las Angustias"). They filled the bullring to the rafters and triumphed once again. It was at about this time, though, that he was losing fan support, seemingly because bullfight-goers generally liked a "purer" style of bullfighting, with Chicuelo II's "reckless" style perhaps being a bit too radical for them. This led him to perform at what was to be his last corrida at Belmonte, Cuenca on 5 October 1957. He did, however, appear at one more bullfight on 3 May 1959 in Valencia, and even appeared at a charitable bullfight in Málaga in early January 1960.

Thereafter, however, Chicuelo II thought it would be a better idea to seek favour among Latin American bullfighting fans, whom he perceived as a bit more accepting, and to that end, he soon afterwards booked himself air passage to South America.

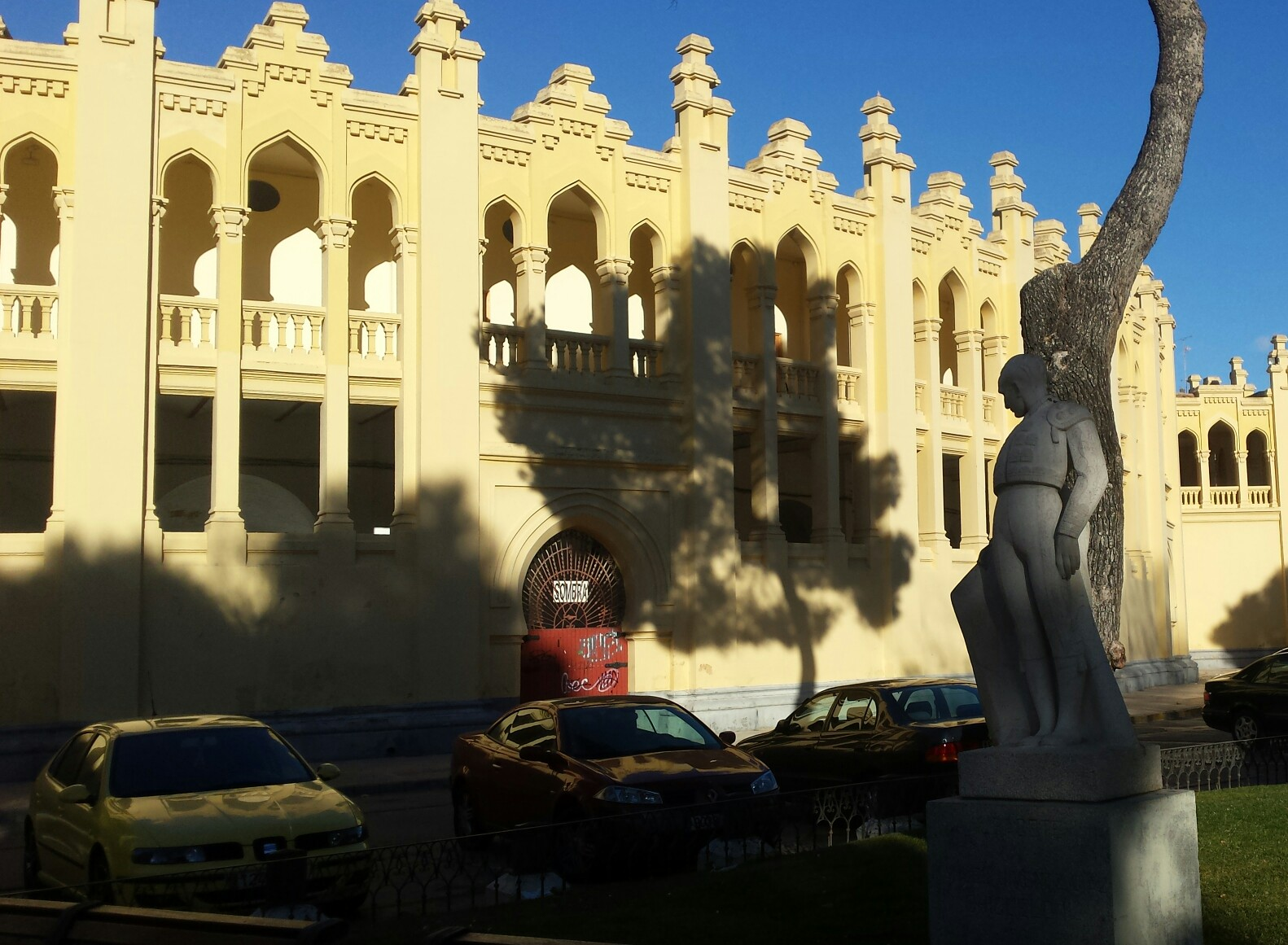
Monumento a Chicuelo II (at right), outside the Albacete bullring (background).

He never got there.

== Death ==
On 21 January 1960, Chicuelo II was on Avianca Flight 671, bound for Bogotá in Colombia when it attempted to land at Montego Bay in Jamaica. The landing was hard, and the aircraft bounced, skidded, burst into flames, and came to rest upside down. Chicuelo II was among the 37 people killed in the disaster. He was 30 years old. Also killed in the crash were Chicuelo II's brother Ricardo and a picador from his bullfighting team ("cuadrilla"), Pepe Díaz.

== Honours ==
In the grounds outside the Albacete bullring in Chicuelo II's hometown is a sculpture in homage to him.

Another sculpture in Chicuelo II's honour, executed in bronze by sculptor Marco Pérez, was unveiled on 27 August 1967 outside the bullring in Cuenca. In the spring of 2014, Cuenca town council offered Chicuelo II a further homage in the form of a footpath named after him, Paseo Chicuelo II, right near the town's bullring. The town's museum, el Museo de Cuenca, exhibits one of Chicuelo II's suits of lights.

The band that provides the "taurine" music for corridas in Nîmes, France is called the Orchestre des arènes Chicuelo II after the bullfighter. This apparently came about after a bullfight at Nîmes at which Chicuelo II was on the bill, and aroused such enthusiasm among some aficionados that they decided to form a peña, or bullfighting fan club, naming it after the one whom they admired. The club's band plays not only at the amphitheatre in Nîmes, but also in Arles and some other places, too.
