= Avianca Flight 671 =

1960 aviation accident

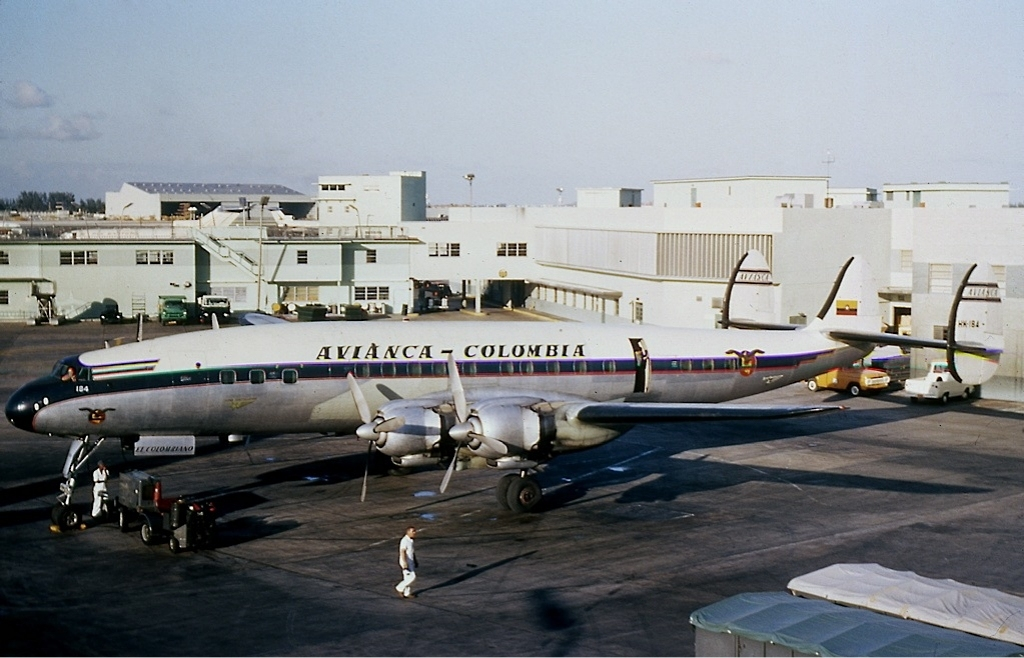
- An Avianca Lockheed L-1049 Super Constellation similar to the accident aircraft

Accident
- Date: 21 January 1960
- Summary: Runway excursion, hard landing
- Site: Montego Bay Airport Montego Bay, Jamaica; 18.5028°N 77.9122°W

Aircraft
- Aircraft type: Lockheed L-1049E Super Constellation
- Operator: Avianca
- Call sign: AVIANCA 671
- Registration: HK-177
- Flight origin: New York-Idlewild Airport
- 1st stopover: Miami International Airport (unscheduled)
- 2nd stopover: Montego Bay Airport; Montego Bay, Jamaica
- Destination: El Dorado International Airport
- Occupants: 46
- Passengers: 39
- Crew: 7
- Fatalities: 37
- Survivors: 9

Avianca Flight 671, registration HK-177, was a Lockheed Constellation that crashed and burned on landing at Montego Bay Airport, Montego Bay, Jamaica, on 21 January 1960. The flight had originated at Miami International Airport, Florida. The aircraft operating the flight was a Lockheed L-1049E Super Constellation used by Avianca for its Bogotá-Montego Bay routes. Thirty-seven of the 46 passengers and crew aboard were killed. It was and remains the worst accident in Jamaican aviation history.

== Background ==
The aircraft itself was a Lockheed Constellation owned by Avianca, a company affiliated with Pan Am. It had 46 passengers on board and 7 crew. Four passengers, tired of waiting for repairs, left the plane while it disembarked in Miami.

The disaster was the fourth major air crash in a span of four days; a Vickers Viscount crashed into a farm in Charles City County, Virginia on January 18 and killed 50, a Sud Aviation Caravelle operated by Scandinavian Airlines crashed on January 19 and killed 42, and a Martin P4M Mercator crashed into Mount Karanfil the same day, killing all 16 Navy soldiers.

== Accident ==
The accident happened at about 02:24 local time, and the weather was overcast with intermittent rain. On landing, the plane made a heavy touchdown, bounced, and landed back on the runway, then skidded down the runway in flames. It came to rest upside down, 580 metres (1,900 ft) from the runway threshold and 60 metres (200 ft) to the left thereof.

== Victims ==
Of the 46 occupants, 37 were killed while nine survived. The dead included all 17 American passengers. seven of whom were residents of New York City. Further, a Canadian reverend, five Colombians, and two Italians were killed, along with Manuel Jiménez Díaz, known as "Chicuelo II", a famous Spanish bullfighter, his brother Ricardo, Thomas C. Capehart, son of the Indiana senator Homer E. Capehart, his wife Elizabeth, and John H. Marhoefer, president of the Marhoefer Packing Company.

The nine survivors consisted of four passengers and five members of the crew.

== Aftermath ==
Following the crash, the airport was temporarily closed.

=== Reactions ===
Governor Kenneth Blackburne expressed his "deepest sympathies" for the victims while visiting the crash site, calling it "the terrible disaster to the Columbian aircraft in Montego Bay." Secretary of State Iain Macleod stated that he was "greatly disturbed to hear about the accident and heavy loss of life", while Alan Hilliard Donald, former Governor of the Cayman Islands, offered his condolences.

=== Investigation ===
In the afternoon following the crash, the government of the then-Colony of Jamaica announced that they would begin investigating the cause of the crash, creating a task force headed by the Director of Civil Aviation and Inspector of Accidents, Kenneth Paton-Jones DFC, and contacting the United Kingdom's Ministry of Transport and Civil Aviation for an expert on plane crashes.

=== ICAO report ===
The International Civil Aviation Organization's (ICAO) report on the Avianca Flight 671 crash stated that there was no evidence that the aircraft was improperly maintained, nor any that it was overloaded. Further, there was no hint of any technical defect that would have made it unairworthy. Its load at the time of the crash was well within the maximum permissible landing weight. However, examination of the aircraft's tire marks on the runway threshold indicated that the aircraft's sinking speed was greater than the 10 feet per second (3.05 m/s) that was deemed safe. Indeed, the flight crew found themselves on an "undesirably high flight path" only one nautical mile (1850 m) from the runway threshold, necessitating a quick descent towards the runway at Montego Bay. The rate of descent would have needed to be more than 1200 feet per minute (6.1 m/s), and would have had dire consequences had this rate been maintained until landing, as this would have been twice the safe limit (20 feet per second, as opposed to 10).

The aircraft's left wing broke off, spilling aviation fuel, leading to a fire whose intensity kept firefighters from reaching the fuselage for about 20 minutes. Both the airport's own fire service and the Montego Bay Fire Brigade were summoned, but the blaze prevented them from rescuing anybody still on the plane in time.

The likely cause of the disaster, according to the ICAO report, was the heavy landing, with a sinking speed well beyond the design maximum. Although the report noted that the overall responsibility for the flight's safety was the captain's, it stopped short of blaming him for the crash, pointing out that there were mitigating circumstances, such as deficiencies in training that might have led to lapses in judgement. Crew fatigue was also mentioned as a possible factor.

The report included recommendations, many of which related to improving emergency exit designs and passengers' ability to open the exits.

== See also ==
- 1960 in aviation
