= Lockheed EP-3 =

Signals reconnaissance aircraft of the US Navy

EP-3A/B Orion EP-3E ARIES / ARIES II
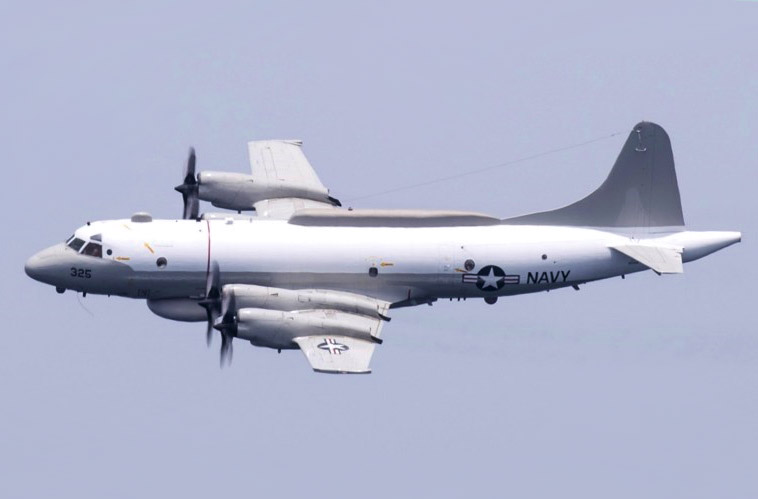
- U.S. Navy EP-3E

General information
- Type: Signals Intelligence (SIGINT)
- National origin: United States
- Manufacturer: Lockheed Corporation
- Status: Active
- Primary users: United States Navy Japan Maritime Self-Defense Force

History
- Developed from: P-3 Orion

The Lockheed EP-3 is an electronic signals reconnaissance variant of the P-3 Orion, formerly operated by the United States Navy.

== Development ==
A total of 12 P-3C aircraft were converted to replace older versions of the aircraft, which had been converted in the late 1960s and early 1970s. The aircraft is known by the acronym ARIES, or "Airborne Reconnaissance Integrated Electronic System". and has signals intelligence (SIGINT) capabilities. SIGINT is the interception of signals, whether communications between people (communications intelligence—abbreviated to COMINT) or from electronic signals not directly used in communication (electronic intelligence—abbreviated to ELINT). The EP-3E generally has a crew of 24, including linguists, cryptographers and technicians.

The squadrons that flew the EP-3E also flew the Lockheed EC-121 Warning Star from 1962 to 1974 and the Douglas EA-3B Skywarrior from 1960 to 1991. There are 11 EP-3Es in the Navy's inventory, the last of which was delivered in 1997.

== Hainan Island incident ==
On 1 April 2001, an aerial collision between a United States Navy EP-3E ARIES II, a signals reconnaissance version and a People's Liberation Army Navy Shenyang J-8II fighter resulted in an international incident between the United States and China. Operating in international waters, about 70 miles (110 km) away from the PRC island province of Hainan Island, the EP-3 was intercepted by two J-8II fighters. One of the J-8IIs purposely collided with it. The J-8II crashed into the sea and the pilot, Lt. Cdr. Wang, was seen to eject after the collision. His body was never recovered and he was declared dead. The EP-3 came close to becoming uncontrollable, at one point sustaining a nearly inverted roll, but was able to make a successful, unauthorized emergency landing at Lingshui airfield on Hainan island, where the two J-8II fighters involved in the incident had been based. At least 15 distress signals from the Orion had gone unanswered. The crew and the plane were subsequently detained by Chinese authorities because of the death of the Chinese pilot.

After several days of interrogations, the crew was repatriated separately to the United States while the aircraft remained in China, reportedly taken apart for research on American intelligence technology. Although the crew attempted to destroy as much classified material, hardware, and software on the aircraft as possible prior to the emergency landing, there is little doubt that the EP-3 was exploited by Chinese intelligence services. An American team was later permitted to enter Hainan in order to dismantle the aircraft, which was subsequently airlifted on board two of Polet Flight's Antonov An-124s back to the United States for reassembly and repair.

This incident is fictionally portrayed in the TV Series JAG: Season 7, Episode 9 https://www.imdb.com/title/tt0613245/?ref_=ttep_ep9

== Other incidents ==
On 29 January 2018, a near accident was reported on the Black Sea, when a Russian Su-27 passed a U.S. EP-3 at a distance of several feet.

In a separate incident, on 5 November 2018, a U.S. EP-3 was again claimed to have been closely passed in international airspace by a Russian Su-27.

On 19 July 2019, a U.S. EP-3 was "performing a multi-nationally recognized and approved mission in international airspace" over the Caribbean Sea, when a Venezuelan Su-30 aggressively shadowed it at an unsafe distance.

== EP-X ==
Boeing has started working on an unscheduled replacement aircraft, the EP-X, based on their 737.

On 16 August 2009, The Navy issued an "EP-X Analysis of Alternatives" that called for "information useful for the execution of the Electronic Patrol-X (EP-X) program which will recapitalize the EP-3E aircraft to provide tactical, theater, and national level Intelligence, Surveillance, Reconnaissance, and Targeting (ISR&T) support to Carrier Strike Groups and to Theater, Combatant, and National Commanders."

On 23 September 2009, leaked Navy budget documents for FY2011 revealed that the EP-X program would be delayed rather than started in that year.

On 1 February 2010, President Obama unveiled his proposed budget for 2010. This budget called for, among other things, canceling the EP-X program.

== Replacement ==
After the cancellation of the EP-X Program, the U.S. Navy replaced the EP-3E Aries II with the Northrop Grumman MQ-4C Triton unmanned aircraft and the MQ-8B Fire Scout unmanned helicopter. All P-3 Orion aircraft assigned to special projects squadrons (VPU) and all EP-3E Aries II aircraft were retired in February 2025.

== Variants ==
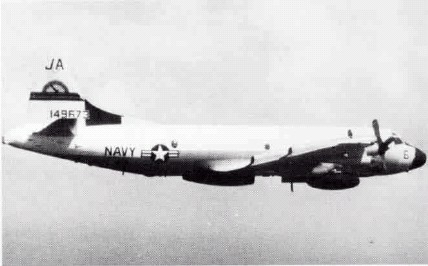
U.S. Navy Lockheed EP-3A Orion of air test and evaluation squadron VX-1 Pioneers in 1983. This aircraft was used in the "EMPASS" project, the "Electromagnetic Performance of Air and Ship Systems" (EMPASS) Project.

- EP-3A: Seven modified for electronic reconnaissance testing.
- EP-3B: Least known of all in the P-3 family. Three P-3As (BuNo 149669, BuNo 149673, and BuNo 149678) were obtained by the CIA from the U.S. Navy under Project STSPIN in May 1963, as the replacement aircraft for CIA's own covert operation fleet of RB-69A/P2V-7Us. Converted by Aerosystems Division of LTV at Greenville, Texas, the three P-3As were simply known as "black" P-3As under Project Axial. Officially transferred from U.S. Navy to CIA in June/July 1964. LTV Aerosystems converted the three aircraft to be both ELINT and COMINT platforms. The first of the three "black" P-3As arrived in Taiwan and were officially transferred to ROCAF's top secret "Black Bat" Squadron on 22 June 1966. Armed with 4 Sidewinder short range AAM missiles for self-defense, the three "black" P-3As flew peripheral missions along the China coast to collect SIGINT and air samples. When the project was terminated in January 1967, all three "black" P-3As were flown to NAS Alameda, California, for long term storage. Two of the three aircraft (BuNo 149669 and BuNo 149678) were converted into the only two EP-3Bs in existence by Lockheed at Burbank in September 1967, while the third aircraft (149673) was converted by Lockheed in 1969–1970 to serve as a development aircraft for various electronic programs. The two EP-3Bs, known as "Bat Rack", owing to their period of service with Taiwan's "Black Bat" Squadron, were issued to the U.S. Navy's VQ-1 Squadron in 1969 and deployed to Da Nang, Vietnam. In the 1980s these two planes were based at the Naval Air Facility, Atsugi, Japan with the Atsugi VQ-1 detachment. Later, the two EP-3Bs were converted to EP-3E ARIES, along with 10 EP-3As. The 12 EP-3Es retired in 1990s, when replaced by 12 EP-3E ARIES II.
- EP-3: ELINT aircraft for the Japanese Maritime Self-Defense Force.
- EP-3E ARIES: 10 P-3As and two EP-3Bs were converted into ELINT aircraft.
- EP-3E ARIES II: 12 P-3Cs were converted into ELINT aircraft. Last delivered in 1997.
- EP-3J: Two Electronic Warfare aircraft that were extensively modified P-3B Orions that supported the Fleet Electronic Warfare Support Group (FEWSG) . The aircraft were used as simulated adversary Electronic Warfare platforms in Tactical Electronic Warfare Squadron 33 (VAQ-33), then transferred to Patrol Squadron 66 (VP-66) and finally transferred to Fleet Air Reconnaissance Squadron 11 (VQ-11).

== Operators ==
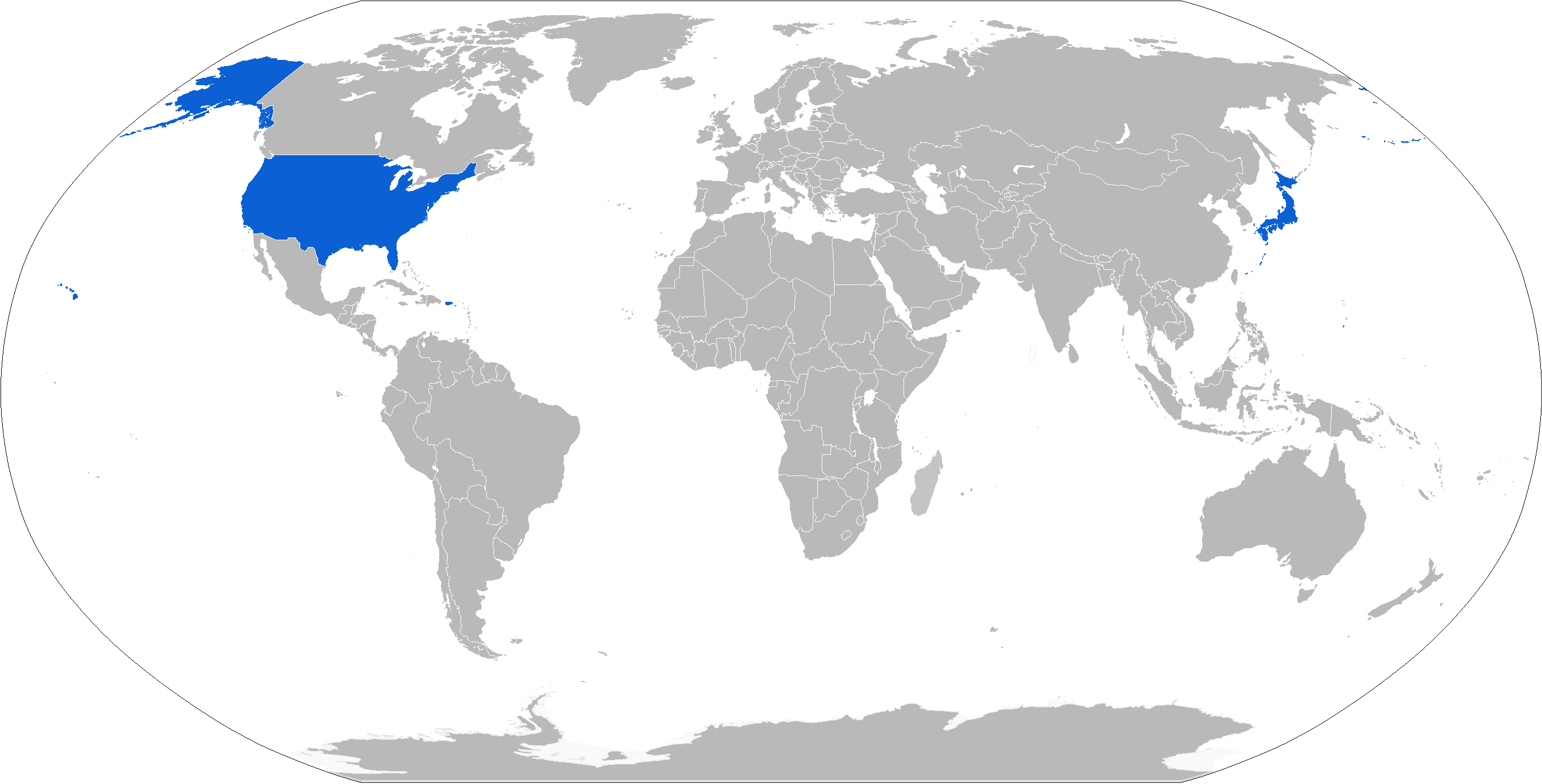
Map with EP-3 operators in blue

=== Current operators ===
==== Japan ====
- Japan Maritime Self-Defense Force – 5 EP-3

=== Former operators ===
==== United States ====
- United States Navy
  - VQ-1 was based at Naval Air Station Whidbey Island until March 28, 2025 when it was disestablished.
  - VQ-2 was based at Naval Station Rota, Spain until 2006 when it moved to Naval Air Station Whidbey Island (disestablished on 17 May 2012).

== Specifications (EP-3E-II – P-3C as indicated) ==
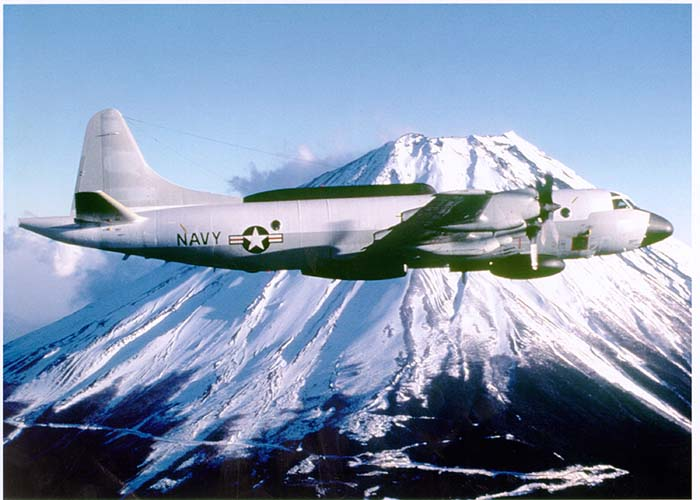
Lockheed EP-3E flying past Mt. Fuji, Japan

Data from Encyclopedia of world military aircraft Vol.2, Jane's All the World's Aircraft 1984–85

General characteristics

- Crew: 4 (minimum)
- Capacity: 19+ mission crew
- Length: 116 ft 10 in (35.61 m)
- Wingspan: 99 ft 8 in (30.38 m) P-3C
- Height: 33 ft 8.5 in (10.274 m) P-3C
- Wing area: 1,300 sq ft (120 m^{2}) P-3C
- Aspect ratio: 7.5 P-3C
- Airfoil: root: NACA 0014-1.10; tip: NACA 0012-1.10 P-3C
- Empty weight: 61,491 lb (27,892 kg) P-3C
- Design zero-fuel weight: 77,200 lb (35,017 kg)
- Gross weight: 135,000 lb (61,235 kg) P-3C
- Max takeoff weight: 142,000 lb (64,410 kg) P-3C
- Maximum landing weight: 103,880 lb (47,119 kg) P-3C
- Fuel capacity: 9,200 US gal (7,700 imp gal; 35,000 L) / 62,000 lb (28,123 kg) P-3C
- Powerplant: 4 × Allison T56-A-14 turboprop engines, 4,910 shp (3,660 kW) each equivalent P-3C
- Propellers: 4-bladed Hamilton Standard 54H60, 13 ft 6 in (4.11 m) diameter constant-speed fully-feathering propellers P-3C

Performance

- Maximum speed: 380 kn (440 mph, 700 km/h) at 15,000 ft (4,572 m)
- Patrol speed: 180 kn (207 mph; 333 km/h)
- Combat range: 2,200 nmi (2,500 mi, 4,100 km) with 0 time on station
- Service ceiling: 28,000 ft (8,500 m)
- Rate of climb: 2,175 ft/min (11.05 m/s) at sea level
- Take-off run: 4,240 ft (1,292 m) at MTOW P-3C
- Take-off distance to 50 ft (15 m): 5,490 ft (1,673 m) at MTOW P-3C
- Landing distance from 50 ft (15 m): 5,490 ft (1,673 m) at Design landing weight P-3C

Avionics

- A wide variety of ELINT, SIGINT and COMINT systems known as the ARIES Suite

== See also ==
Related development

- Lockheed L-188 Electra
- Lockheed P-3 Orion
- Lockheed WP-3D Orion
- Lockheed CP-140 Aurora
- Lockheed P-7

Aircraft of comparable role, configuration, and era

- Hawker Siddeley Nimrod R1
- Shaanxi Y-9JZ
- Ilyushin Il-20
- Sukhoi Su-24MP

Related lists

- List of military aircraft of the United States
- List of active United States military aircraft
- List of Lockheed aircraft
- Chinese espionage in the United States
