= VQ-1 =

US Navy aerial recon squadron

Fleet Air Reconnaissance Squadron 1
- VQ-1 insignia
- Active: 1 June 1955 - 28 March 2025
- Country: United States
- Branch: United States Navy
- Type: Fleet Air Reconnaissance
- Role: Aerial reconnaissance signals intelligence
- Garrison/HQ: Naval Air Station Whidbey Island
- Nickname: World Watchers
- Engagements: Gulf of Tonkin incident Vietnam War; Gulf War; Hainan Island incident Operation Enduring Freedom

Aircraft flown
- Reconnaissance: Lockheed P-3 Orion; Lockheed EP-3; WV-2Q Super Constellations; EA-3 Skywarrior

Fleet Air Reconnaissance Squadron 1 (VQ-1) was an aviation unit of the United States Navy established on 1 June 1955. Its role was aerial reconnaissance and signals intelligence. The squadron was nicknamed the "World Watchers" and was based at NAS Whidbey Island, flying Lockheed EP-3E Aries II aircraft.

== Squadron History ==
The lineage of VQ-1's "World Watchers" can be traced back to two PBY-5A Catalina "Black Cats" modified for electronic reconnaissance during World War II. The unit formally established as the Special Electronic Search Project at NAS Sangley Point, in October 1951. By 13 May 1953, when it was redesignated Detachment Able of Airborne Early Warning Squadron One (VW-1), the unit operated four P4M-1Q Mercators.

=== 1950s ===
When Detachment Able was reorganized into Electronic Countermeasures Squadron One (VQ-1) at Iwakuni, Japan on 1 June 1955, it was the first squadron dedicated to electronic warfare. The EA-3 Skywarrior served the squadron for the next three decades.

=== 1960s ===
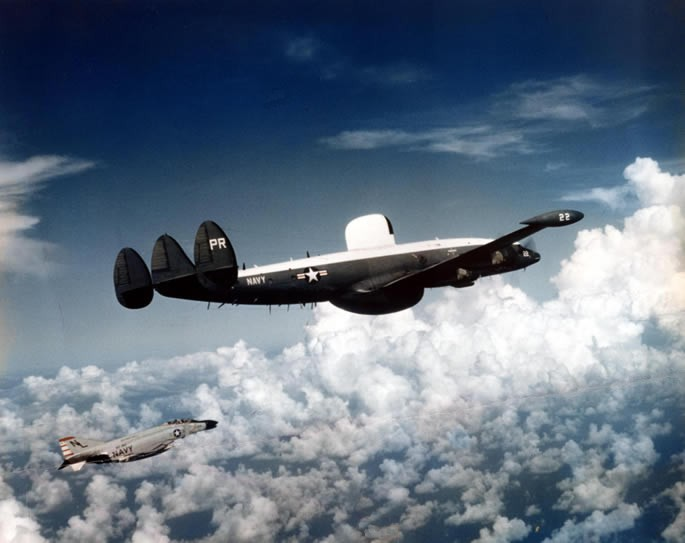
An EC-121M Warning Star of fleet VQ-1 World Watchers accompanied by a McDonnell F-4B Phantom II

In 1960, not only was VQ-1 moved to Atsugi, Japan, and redesignated Fleet Air Reconnaissance Squadron ONE, but the last Mercator was retired and replaced by the first of many WV-2Q Super Constellations (also known as "Willie Victor"). They would remain the backbone of VQ-1's long-range, land-based reconnaissance efforts through the Vietnam War.

The squadron's involvement in the Vietnam War started characteristically, at the very beginning when a Skywarrior crew was awarded the Navy Unit Commendation for their role in the Gulf of Tonkin incident of 2–5 August 1964. For the next nine years, VQ-1 would operate from Da Nang, NAS Cubi Point, Bangkok, and aircraft carriers on patrol in Yankee Station and other bases in Southeast Asia. VQ-1's aircrews supported countless air strikes and are credited with assisting in the destruction of numerous MiG aircraft and Komar patrol boats.

15 April 1969, an EC-121M Warning Star of VQ-1 on a reconnaissance mission was shot down by North Korean MiG-21 aircraft over the Sea of Japan. All 31 Americans (30 Sailors and 1 Marine) on board were killed, which constitutes the largest single loss of U.S. aircrew during the Cold War era.

The first EP-3 Aries I joined the squadron in 1969, beginning the replacement program for the Super Constellations.

=== 1970s ===
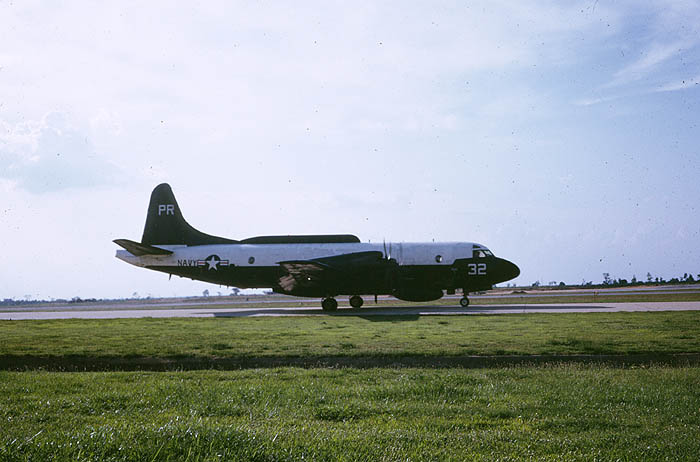
A VQ-1 EP-3B at NAS Agana, Guam, April 1972

On 16 March 1970, a squadron EC-121K #145927 crashed on landing at Da Nang Air Base. The aircraft struck a hangar and caught fire killing 22 of the 28-man crew.

The next aircraft lost by VQ-1 was in September 1973 when an EA-3B, with five crewmen, was on an overwater navigational training flight from Guam to the Philippines. Unable to locate land, the crew was forced to bail out at the fuel exhaustion point. The entire crew was picked up by a helicopter from the Japanese destroyer Haruna.

In 1971, VQ-1 moved its homeport to NAS Agana, Guam, while retaining a permanent detachment at Atsugi, Japan. At that time it absorbed Heavy Photographic Squadron 61 (VAP-61) and its former parent unit, VW-1.

At the end of U.S. combat operations in Vietnam in 1973 VQ-1 began a move back to providing open ocean tactical electronic support to Seventh Fleet carrier battle groups.

In April 1975, two VQ-1 EP-3E aircraft and three aircrews were tasked and deployed to NAS Cubi Point, Philippines, in support of the pending evacuation of Vietnam as part of CTF 72. VQ-1 was assigned the responsibility of providing 24-hour-a-day overlapping coverage in the Vietnam Combat Zone with supporting maintenance, intelligence and operations personnel temporarily located at the VQ-1 Detachment at NAS Cubi Point. Given a specific list of criteria, VQ-1 personnel made the first call to recommend the start of Operation Frequent Wind. Those squadron aircrew members directly involved in the flight operations were recognized as serving in the Vietnam Combat Zone and were eventually awarded a Meritorious Unit Commendation, Humanitarian Action Medal, and Vietnam Service Medal when in 2003 Operation Frequent Wind was reclassified as the 18th and final campaign of the Vietnam War.

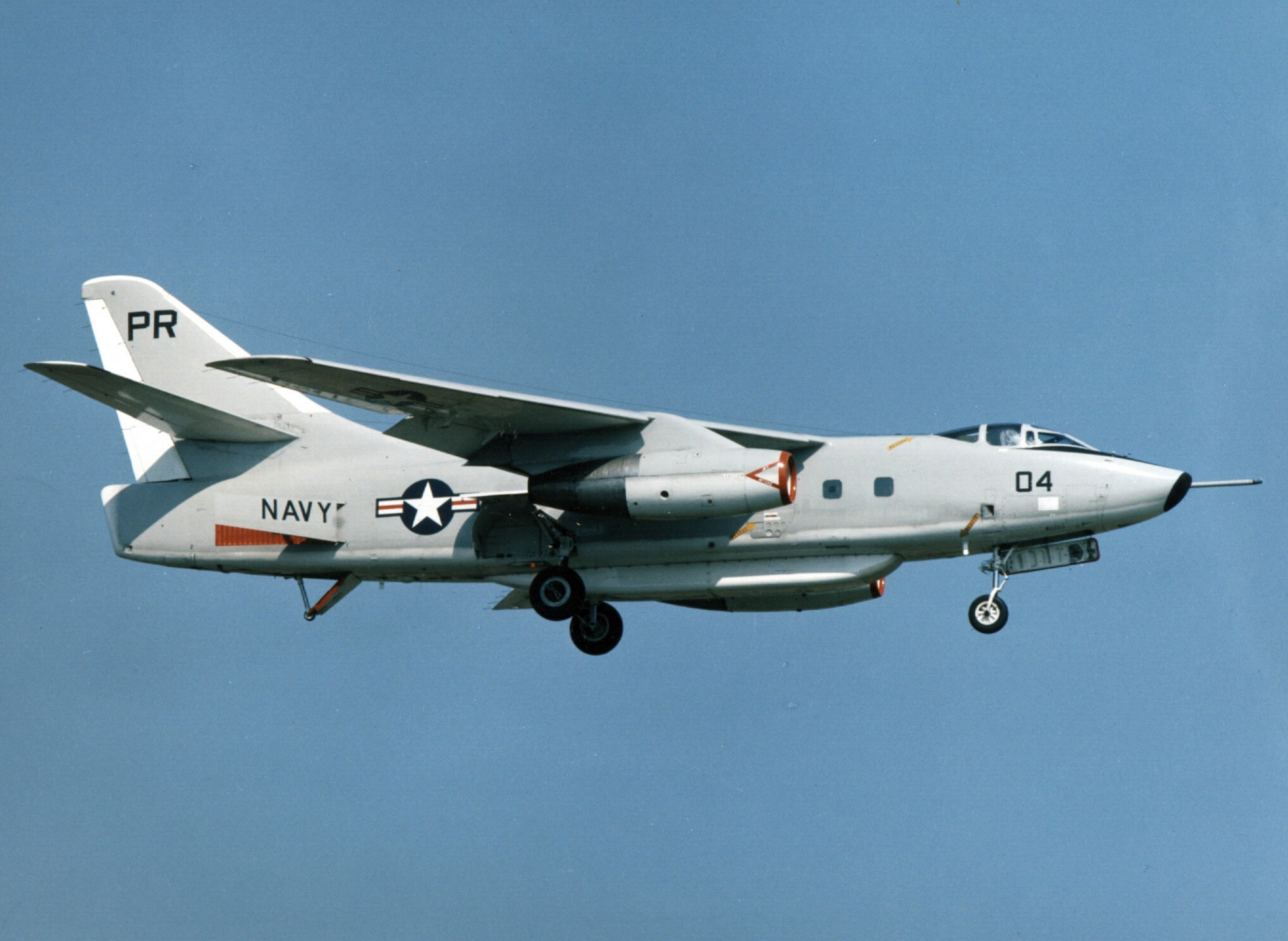
EA-3B VQ-1 in flight near NAF Atsugi

=== 1980s ===
CDR John T. Mitchell assumed command of VQ-1 in March 1984. Ten months later, on 23 January 1985, he and eight other VQ-1 personnel were killed when the squadron VIP aircraft was lost at sea en route to Guam from Atsugi. A massive air and sea search and rescue effort failed to locate any trace of the VA-3B or its crew and passengers. They were presumed killed or lost at sea.

After the departure of the last Skywarrior in the late 1989, the squadron flew the EP-3 Aries I exclusively.

=== 1990s ===
In 1991 the squadron closed its permanent detachment in Atsugi, Japan after 30 years and moved it to Misawa, Japan. In the same year, VQ-1 received the first EP-3E Aries II, an upgraded version of the Aries I using modified P-3C airframes. The squadron played a key role in Operations Desert Shield and Desert Storm.

In 1994, as a result of the base closure of NAS Agana, VQ-1 changed the homeport to NAS Whidbey Island, USA. In July 1994, VQ-1 retired the Navy's oldest operational P-3, EP-3E Aries I. Its retirement also marked VQ-1's transition to all EP-3E Aries II mission aircraft.

=== 2000s ===
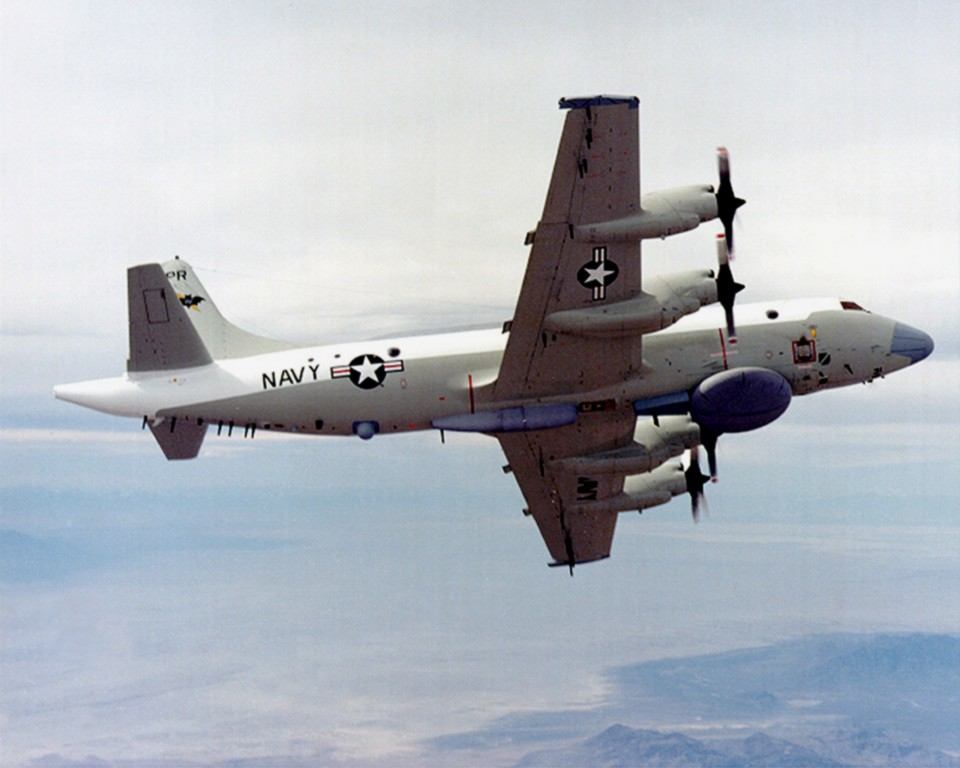
An EP-3E Aries II of VQ-1 in flight in 2006.

On 1 April 2001, an incident occurred when a mid-air collision between an EP-3E of VQ-1 and a People's Liberation Army Navy J-8II fighter jet resulted in an international dispute between the United States of America and the People's Republic of China. The accident happened after one of the J-8s, piloted by Lieutenant Commander Wang Wei made two close passes to the EP-3. On the third pass, it collided with the EP-3. The J-8 broke into two pieces. The EP-3 made an unauthorized emergency landing at Lingshui airfield, due to severe damage, after at least 15 distress signals had gone unanswered. For 15 minutes after landing, the EP-3 crew continued to destroy sensitive items and data on board the aircraft, as per Department of Defense protocol. They disembarked from the aircraft after soldiers looked through windows, pointed guns, and shouted through bullhorns. The crew of the EP-3 was released on 11 April 2001, and returned to their base at Whidbey Island via Honolulu, Hawaii, where they were subject to two days of intense debriefings, followed by a heroes' welcome.

Within a month of the September 11 attacks the squadron was flying missions over Afghanistan as part of Operation Enduring Freedom.

In 2002, VQ-1 maintained a permanent detachment in Misawa, Japan, in addition to its home base at Whidbey and its presence in the Persian Gulf. Its area of responsibility reaches from the east coast of Africa to the west coast of the United States, roughly two-thirds of the world's surface.

When defense budget reductions mandated the disestablishment of VQ-1's sister squadron, VQ-2, in May 2012, VQ-1 became the U.S. Navy's sole fleet air reconnaissance squadron flying the EP-3E Aries II and dedicated to the signals intelligence (SIGINT) mission.

VQ-1 retired their final EP-3E on 13 February 2025, and their final P-3C on 21 February 2025 launched out by Petty Officer First Class Bradley Dillon. VQ-1 was formally decommissioned on 28 March 2025.
