= Martin P4M Mercator =

WW2-era American maritime reconnaissance aircraft

P4M Mercator
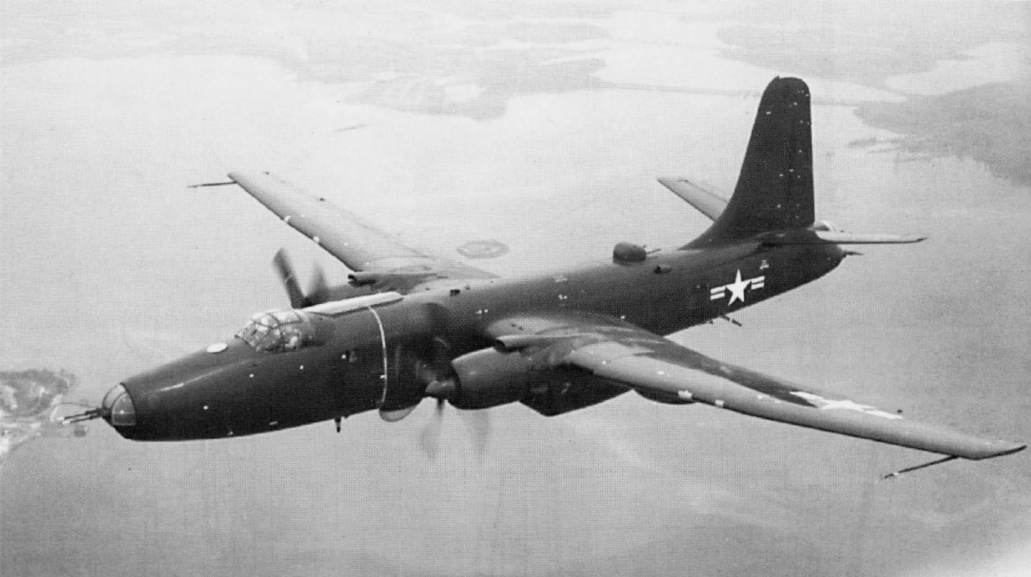
- United States Navy P4M-1

General information
- Type: Patrol bomber
- National origin: United States
- Manufacturer: Martin
- Status: Retired
- Primary user: United States Navy
- Number built: 21

History
- Introduction date: 1950
- First flight: 20 October 1946
- Retired: 1960

The Martin P4M Mercator was a maritime reconnaissance aircraft built by the Glenn L. Martin Company. The Mercator was an unsuccessful contender for a United States Navy requirement for a long-range maritime patrol bomber, with the Lockheed P2V Neptune chosen instead. It saw a limited life as a long-range electronic reconnaissance aircraft. Its most unusual feature was that it was powered by a combination of piston engines and turbojets, the latter being in the rear of the engine nacelles.

== Design and development ==
Work began on the Model 219 in 1944, as a replacement for the PB4Y Privateer long-range patrol bomber, optimised for long range minelaying missions, with the first flight being on 20 October 1946. A large and complicated aircraft, it was powered by two Pratt & Whitney R4360 Wasp Major 28-cylinder radial engines. To give a boost during takeoff and combat, two Allison J33 turbojets were fitted in the rear of the two enlarged engine nacelles, the intakes being beneath and behind the radial engines. The jets, like those on most other piston/jet hybrids, burned gasoline instead of jet fuel which eliminated the need for separate fuel tanks.

A tricycle undercarriage was fitted, with the nosewheel retracting forwards. The single-wheel main legs retracted into coverless fairings in the wings, so that the sides of the wheels could be seen even when retracted. The wings themselves, unusually, had a different airfoil cross-section on the inner wings than the outer.

Heavy defensive armament was fitted, with two 20 mm (.79 in) cannon in an Emerson nose turret and a Martin tail turret, and two 0.5 in (12.7 mm) machine guns in a Martin dorsal turret. The bomb bay was, like British practice, long and shallow rather than the short and deep bay popular in American bombers. This gave greater flexibility in payload, including long torpedoes, bombs, mines, depth charges or extended-range fuel tanks.

== Operational history ==
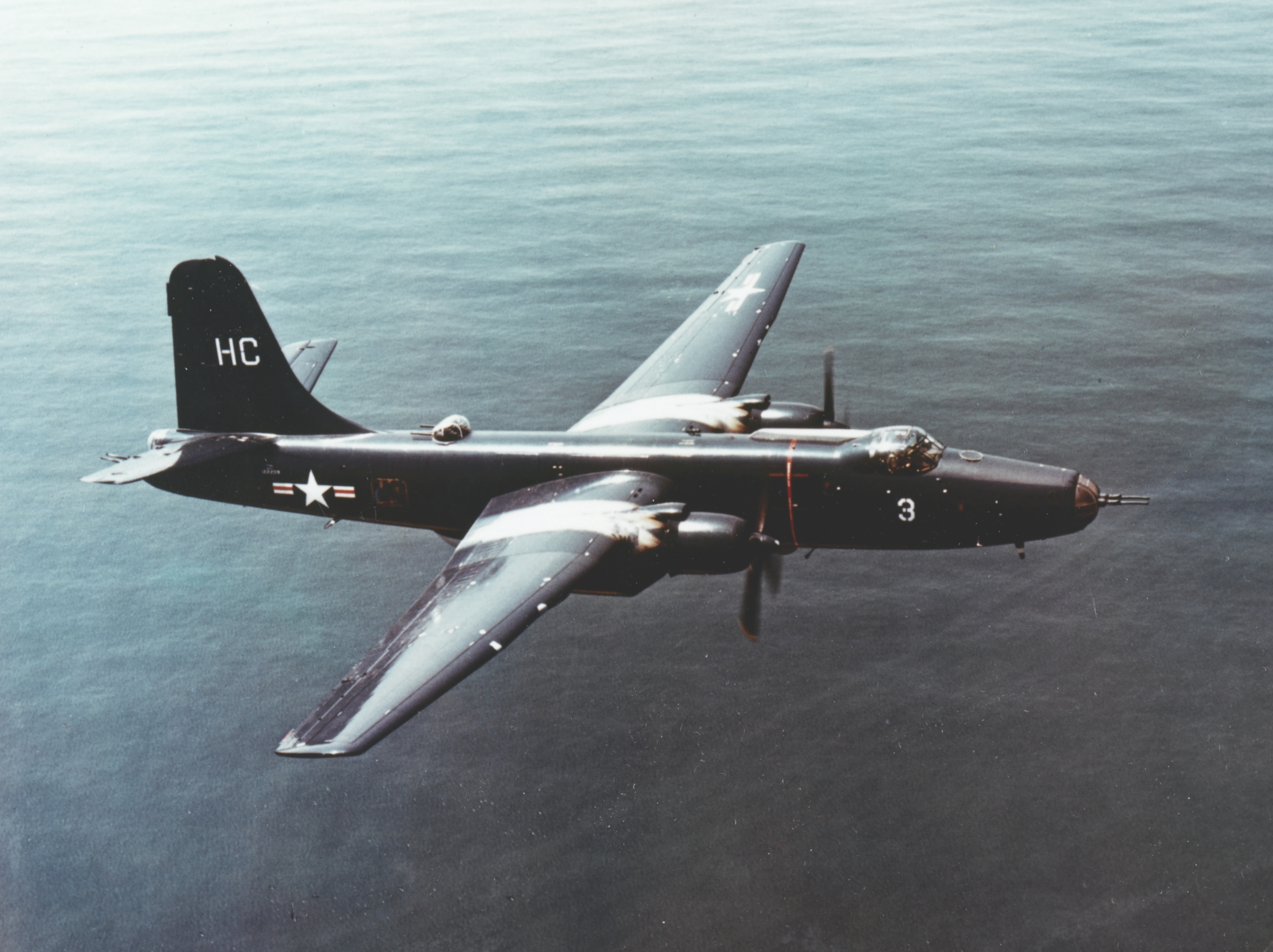
P4M-1 of VP-21

The US Navy chose the smaller, simpler, cheaper and better performing P2V Neptune for the maritime patrol requirement, but nineteen aircraft were ordered in 1947 for high-speed minelaying purposes. The P4M entered service with Patrol Squadron 21 (VP-21) in 1950, the squadron deploying to NAS Port Lyautey in French Morocco. It remained in use with VP-21 until February 1953.

From 1951, the 18 surviving production P4Ms were modified for the electronic reconnaissance (or SIGINT, for signals intelligence) mission as the P4M-1Q, to replace the PB4Y-2 Privateer. The crew was increased to 14 and later 16 to operate all the surveillance gear, and the aircraft was fitted with a large number of different antennae.

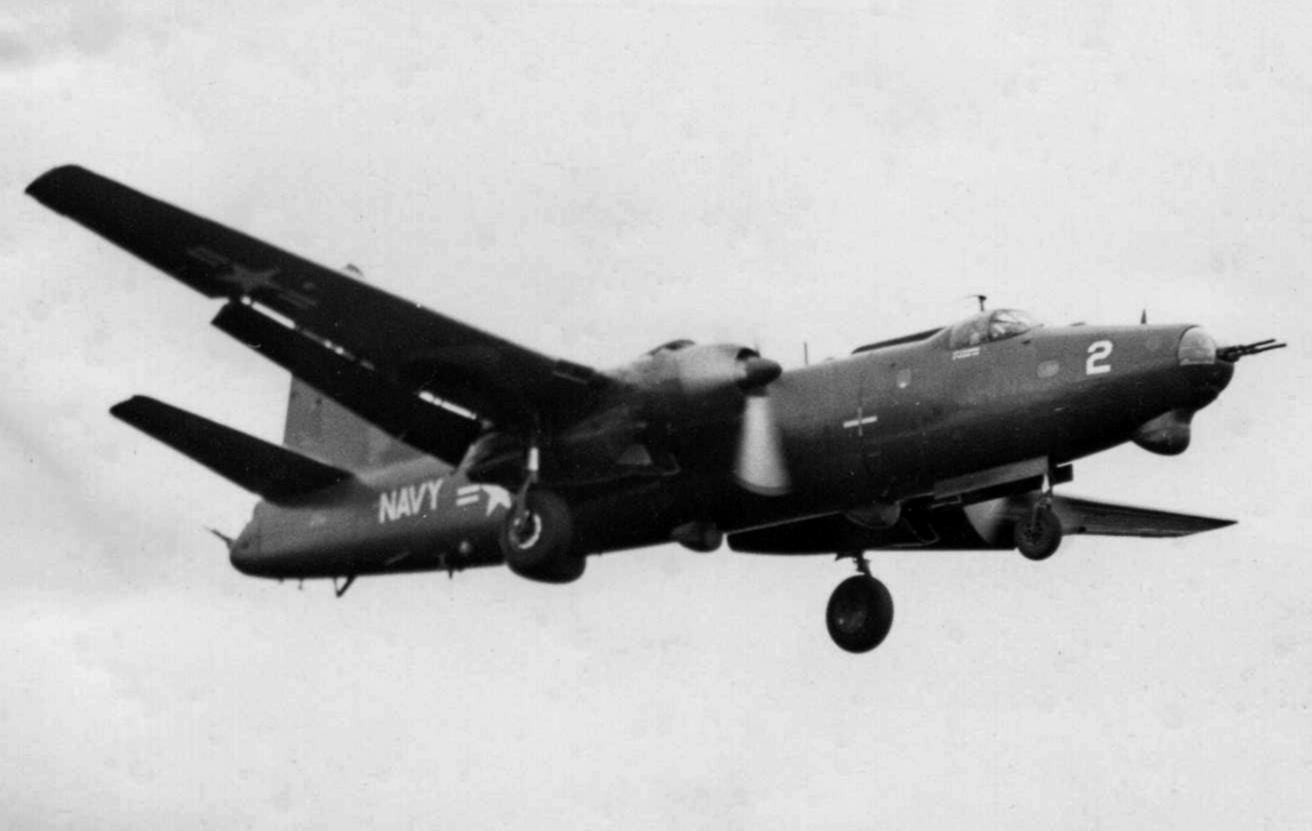
P4M-1Q Mercator of VQ-2 electronics reconnaissance squadron in September 1956 - note extra radar 'bulges' on this variant

Starting in October 1951, electronic surveillance missions were flown from U.S. Naval Station Sangley Point in the Philippines, later from Naval Air Station Iwakuni, Japan, and Naval Air Station Atsugi, Japan, by a secretive unit that eventually gained the designation Fleet Air Reconnaissance Squadron One (VQ-1). Long missions were flown along the coast (about 30 nmi or 56 km offshore) of Vietnam, China, North Korea and the eastern Soviet Union, and were of a highly secret nature; the aircraft sometimes masqueraded as regular P2V Neptunes in radio communications, and often flew with false serial numbers (Bureau Numbers) painted under the tail. Operational missions were always flown at night, during the dark with the moon when possible, and with no external running lights.

The Mercators were replaced by the EA-3B Skywarrior, which, being carrier-based, had a greater degree of flexibility, and the larger Lockheed WV-2Q Warning Star. Final withdrawal from service was in 1960 after which all of the remaining P4Ms were scrapped.

== Losses ==
- On 8 March 1951 a Mercator flew into the Atlantic Ocean off Florida, killing four of its crew.
- On 6 February 1952, a Mercator ditched in the Aegean Sea north of Cyprus at night, out of fuel, with no power, losing only the aircraft commander/pilot after the crew was in the water. The crew was rescued by the Royal Navy destroyer HMS Chevron. (Note: The aircraft were also operated from Morocco by Fleet Air Reconnaissance Squadron 2 (VQ-2). One garbled version of this incident provided by a former U.S. Navy seaman who served in the Mediterranean is that this aircraft was intercepted near Soviet airspace off the Ukrainian Soviet Socialist Republic and shot down, crashing into the Mediterranean Sea with the loss of all crew.)
- On 22 August 1956, a Mercator was shot down near Shanghai by Chinese fighters of the 2nd Aviation Division, with its crew of 16 all killed.
- On 19 November 1957, a Mercator was lost in an accident.
- On 6 January 1958, a P4M-1Q of JQ-3 crashed at Ocean View, Virginia, when it lost an engine on approach to NAS Norfolk, Virginia, killing four crew and injuring three civilians.
- On 16 June 1959, a P4M-1Q was attacked by two North Korean MiG-17s with heavy damage and serious injury to the tail gunner.
- On 19 January 1960, a Fleet Air Reconnaissance Squadron 2 (VQ-2) P4M-1Q JQ-16 (BuNo 124365) crashed en route to Adana Air Base in Turkey, killing all 16 aircrew. The Royal Air Force Mountain Rescue Team based at Nicosia, Cyprus, recovered the bodies of 12 crew members before being forced to leave the recovery of the remaining bodies and body parts until the spring.

== Variants ==
XP4M-1
Two prototype aircraft with two R-4360-4 engines.
P4M-1
Production aircraft with two R-4360-20A engines, 19 built.
P4M-1Q
P4M-1s redesignated when modified for radar countermeasures.

== Operators ==
United States

- United States Navy

== Specifications (P4M-1 Mercator) ==
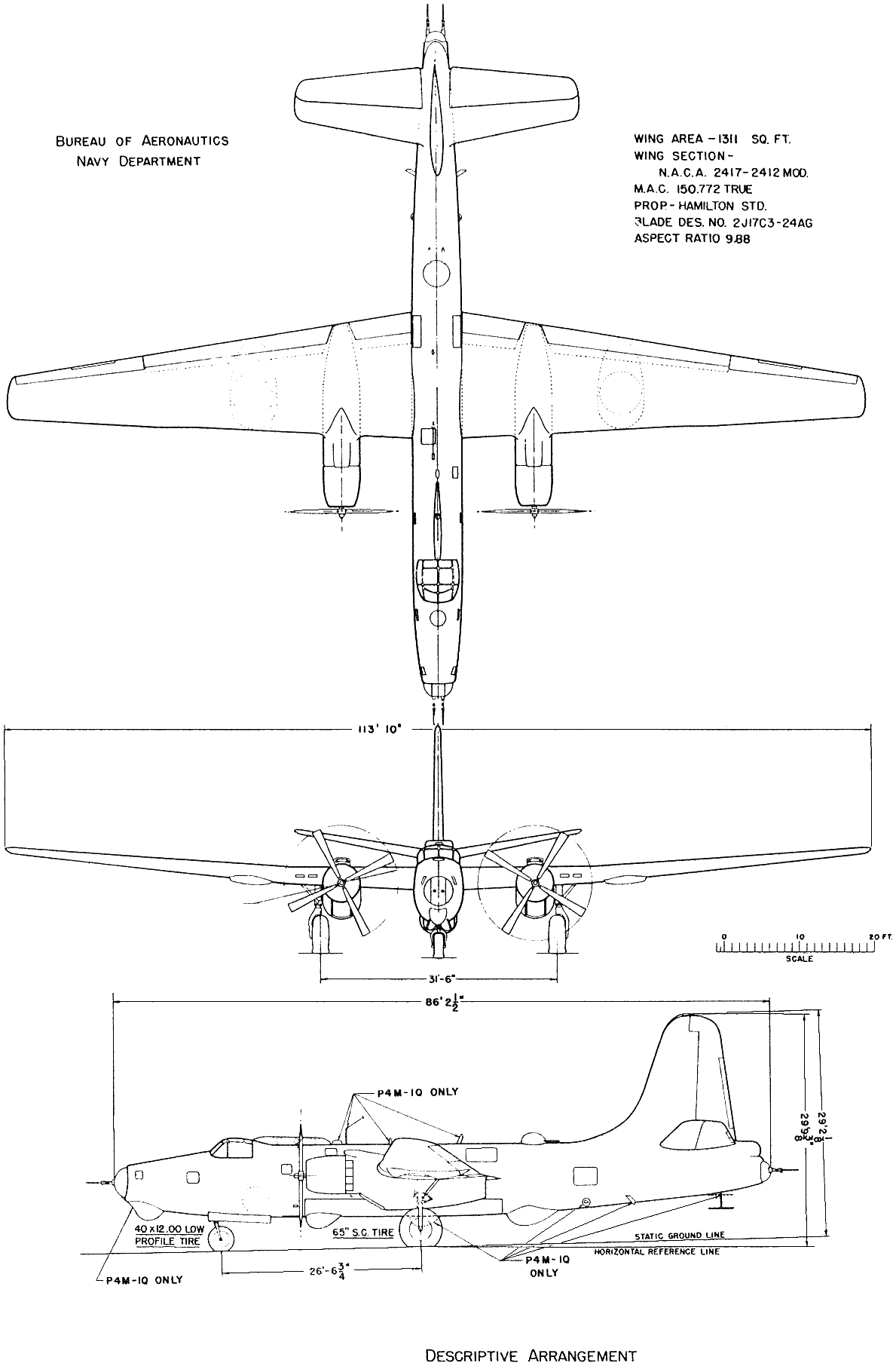
3-view line drawing of the Martin P4M-1Q Mercator

Data from United States Navy aircraft since 1911, Naval Fighters #37: Martin P4M-1/-1Q Mercator

General characteristics

- Crew: 9 (patrol bomber); 16 (Electronic reconnaissance)
- Length: 86 ft 2.5 in (26.276 m)
- Wingspan: 114 ft 0 1/16 in (34.749 m)
- Height: 29 ft 2 1/16 in (8.892 m)
- Wing area: 1,311 sq ft (121.8 m^{2})
- Aspect ratio: 9.87
- Airfoil: root: NACA 2417 (17%); tip: NACA 2412 (12%)
- Empty weight: 48,536 lb (22,016 kg)
- Gross weight: 83,378 lb (37,820 kg)
- Fuel capacity:

Fuel (115/145 Avgas): 3,500 US gal (2,900 imp gal; 13,000 L) total in 4 wing tanks and 4 auxiliary tanks in the bomb bay
Oil: 216 US gal (180 imp gal; 820 L) in 2 nacelle tanks
Water 9 US gal (7.5 imp gal; 34 L) in 2 nacelle tanks

- Powerplant: 2 × Pratt & Whitney R-4360-20A Wasp Major 28-cylinder air-cooled radial piston engines, 3,250 hp (2,420 kW) each with water injection

(XP4M-1: 2,975 hp (2,218 kW) R-4360-4)

- Powerplant: 2 × Allison J33-A-10A turbojet engines, 4,600 lbf (20 kN) thrust each

(XP4M-1: 3,825 lbf (17,010 N) J33-A-17)

- Propellers: 4-bladed Hamilton Standard, 15 ft 2 in (4.62 m) diameter reversible-pitch constant-speed propellers

Performance

- Maximum speed: 410 mph (660 km/h, 360 kn) at 20,100 ft (6,100 m)
- Range: 2,840 mi (4,570 km, 2,470 nmi)
- Ferry range: 4,230 mi (6,810 km, 3,680 nmi) with bomb-bay auxiliary tanks fitted
- Service ceiling: 34,600 ft (10,500 m)

Armament

- 4 × 20 mm (0.787 in) cannon in nose and tail turrets
- 2 × 0.50 in (12.70 mm) machine guns in dorsal turret
- Up to 12,000 lb (5,400 kg) of bombs, mines, depth charges, or torpedoes

Avionics

- AN/APS-33 search radar

== See also ==
Aircraft of comparable role, configuration, and era

- Avro Shackleton
- Consolidated PB4Y-2 Privateer
- Lockheed P-2 Neptune
- Lockheed P-3 Orion

Related lists

- List of United States Navy aircraft designations (pre-1962)
