= Pedrés =

Spanish bullfighter (1932–2021)

- Born: Pedro Martínez González; 11 February 1932; Albacete, Spain
- Died: 6 September 2021 (aged 89); Madrid, Spain
- Occupation: Bullfighter

Pedro Martínez González, better known as Pedrés (11 February 1932 – 6 September 2021) was a Spanish bullfighter.

== Biography ==
Pedrés made his debut as a novillada with picadors in Albacete on 16 September 1942. On 8 June 1952, he participated in a bullfight alongside Juan Montero. He appeared in an alternativa on 12 October 1952 and was first in the escalafón in 1953.
