= VQ-2 =

Inactive US Navy aerial recon squadron

Fleet Air Reconnaissance Squadron VQ-2
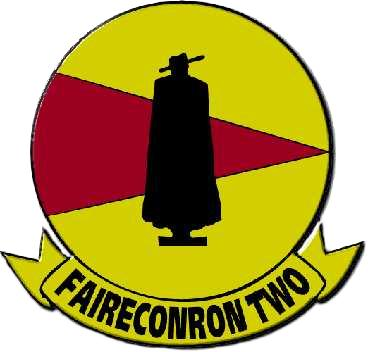
- VQ-2 insignia
- Active: 1 September 1955 – 22 May 2012
- Country: United States
- Branch: United States Navy
- Type: Fleet Air Reconnaissance
- Role: Aerial reconnaissance, Electronic reconnaissance
- Garrison/HQ: NAS Port Lyautey, Morocco NS Rota, Spain Then NAS Whidbey Island
- Nicknames: "Batmen," "Sandeman"
- Motto: Eternal vigilance is the price of freedom.
- Colors: (1955–1983), (1987–2012); (1983–1987)
- Engagements: Vietnam War; 1982 Lebanon War; Beirut Crisis; Operation El Dorado Canyon; Gulf War; Operation Deny Flight; Operation Provide Comfort; Operation Provide Promise; Operation Sharp Guard; Operation Join Endeavor; Operation Decisive Endeavor; Operation Deliberate Guard; Operation Silver Wake; Operation Enduring Freedom

Aircraft flown
- Reconnaissance: Martin P4M Mercator (1954-1960); Lockheed P2V-5F Neptune (1954–1960); Douglas A3D-1Q Skywarrior (1956–1960); Douglas A3D-2Q/EA-3B Skywarrior (1959–1991); Lockheed WV-2Q/EC-121M Warning Star (1960–1974); Lockheed EP-3E Aries (1971–2012)

Fleet Air Reconnaissance Squadron VQ-2, also known as "Batmen" and later "Sandeman," was an air reconnaissance squadron of the United States Navy, established on 1 September 1955 and based at NAS Whidbey Island, previously at NAVSTA Rota, Spain, flying both Douglas EA-3B Skywarrior and Lockheed EP-3E Aries aircraft until 1991 and then strictly EP-3E aircraft until 2012. The squadron was disestablished on 22 May 2012.

== Squadron history ==
=== 1950s ===
==== Roots ====
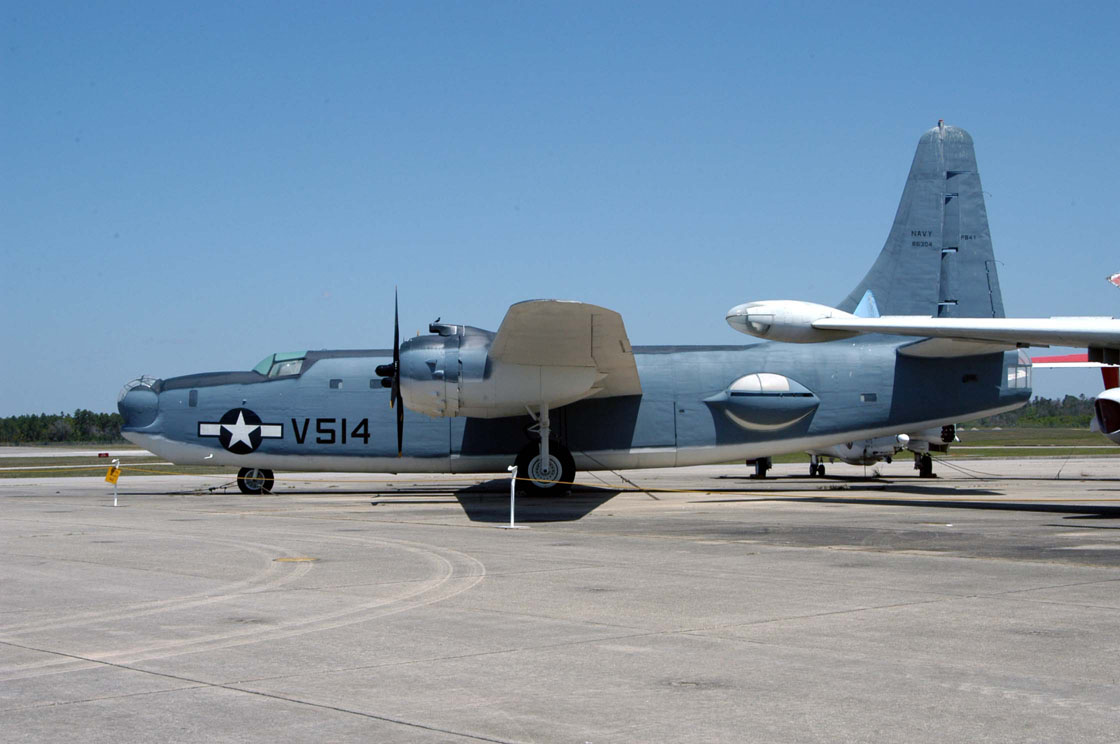
PB4Y-2 BuNo 66261 (marked as BuNo 66304) in the collection of the National Naval Aviation Museum at NAS Pensacola, Florida.

Fleet Air Reconnaissance in the European Theater had been conducted since the start of the Cold War by detachments within patrol squadrons (VP) flying modified PB4Y-2 Privateers from NAS Port Lyautey and conducting missions in the Baltic, Black, Mediterranean, and North Seas. These missions occasionally provoked reactions, sometimes hostile, from behind the Iron Curtain. On 8 April 1950, Soviet Lavochkin La-11 fighters shot down a Lyautey-based PB4Y-2 Privateer (BUNO 59645) over the Baltic Sea, off the coast of Liepāja, Latvia with the loss of all ten aircrew.

Shortly after the start of the Korean War in 1950, a dedicated unit, Naval Air Activities (NAA), Port Lyautey Patrol Unit (NPU) was established with three PB4Y-2 aircraft and personnel transferred from VP-26. As this unit demonstrated its value to the Navy, the Chief of Naval Operations (CNO) and the Bureau of Aeronautics (BuAer) came to realize that a dedicated aircraft was a necessity.

By 1952, the VP community had not had much success with the P4M-1 Mercator that it had deployed to Morocco due to maintenance issues arising from its nineteen airframe total production run. The rest of the VP community found easier maintenance with the Lockheed P2V Neptunes deployed in theater because that airframe had been adopted as the VP standard asset. The maritime patrol commanders removed the Mercators from frontline service at Port Lyautey in favor of the Neptune. Washington subsequently decided to reconfigure all but one P4M-1 as P4M-1Qs and permanently assign them to the Naval Communications Units established at NPU and its sister unit at NAS Sangley Point, Philippines. Having lost an aircraft and lives to hostile Soviet action, the aircrew appreciated the added takeoff and combat speed of the two Allison J33-A-10A turbojet engines mounted in the aft of the Pratt & Whitney R-4360-20A Wasp Major radial's nacelles.

In 1953, with the conversion and deployment of the P4M-1Q, NPU needed an administrative identity as part of the Naval Air Force Atlantic (AIRLANT) structure and Airborne Early Warning Squadron TWO (VW-2) at NAS Patuxent River, Maryland became the command into which NPU was folded as VW-2 DET A. Since VW-2 Det A's mission began to diverge greatly from the parent unit's VW mission, the Navy decided to establish dedicated squadrons for the Fleet Air Reconnaissance mission. One was to be formed from VW-2 Det A and the other would be formed from its sister unit at Sangley Point, VW-1 Det A. By mid-1954, four P4M-1Qs and one Lockheed P2V-2 Neptune were at Port Lyautey. The P2V-2, stripped of ASW equipment, served as a trainer and logistics aircraft.

The unit operated all over the European Theater from a variety of bases. Regular deployment sites were Incirlik AB, Turkey; RAF Mildehnall, United Kingdom; Wiesbaden AB, West Germany; RAF Schleswigland, West Germany; and RAF Hal Far, Malta.

==== Establishment ====
VQ-2 was commissioned as Electronic Countermeasures Squadron TWO (ECMRON TWO) on 1 September 1955, to provide the United States with an improved defense posture. The squadron took over VW-2 DET A's spaces and hangar at NAS Port Lyautey. Through the 1950s, VQ-2 would continue to fly missions throughout the European Theater operating from Cyprus, Germany, Libya, Turkey, and the United Kingdom. At commissioning, Commander Morris L. Kalin led a total complement of 24 officers and 78 enlisted men.

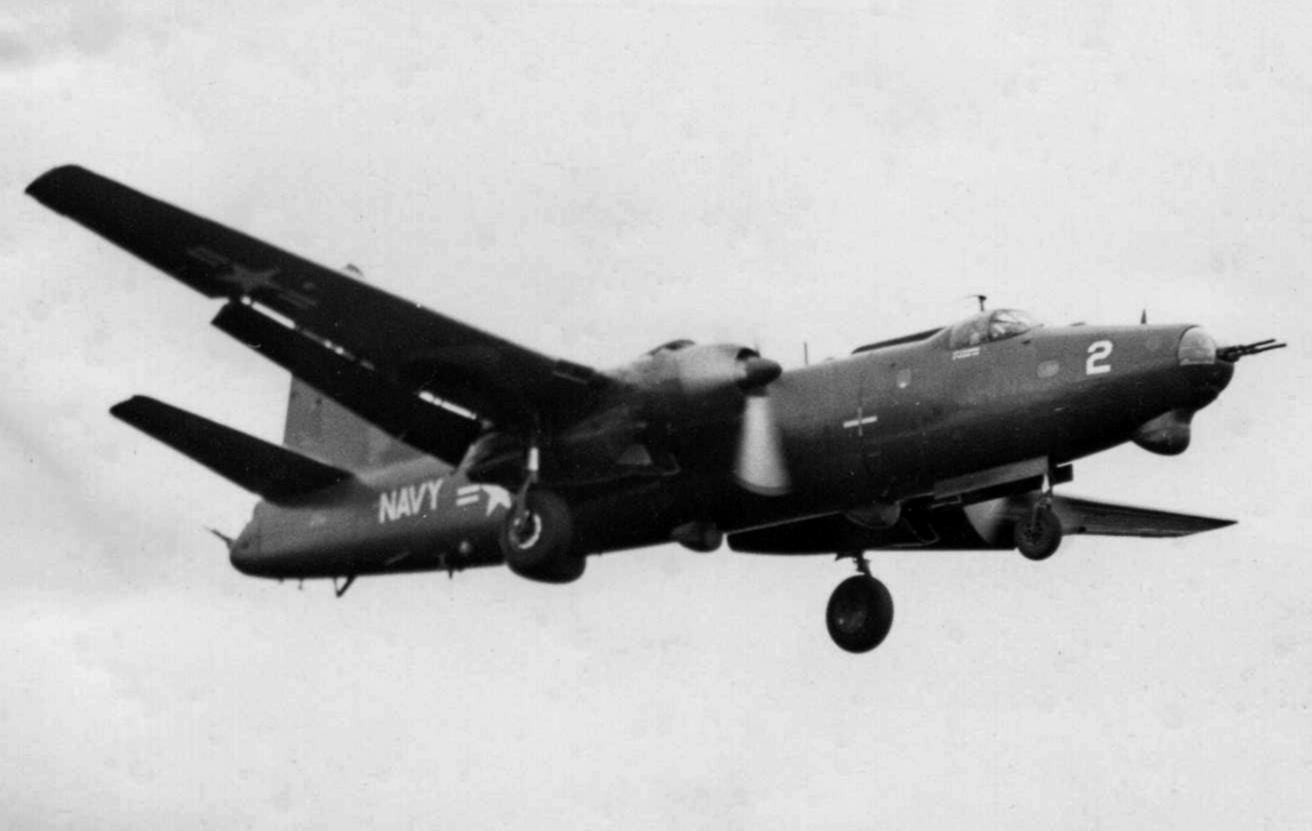
P4M-1Q Mercator of VQ-2 electronics reconnaissance squadron in September 1956 - note extra radar 'bulges' on this variant.

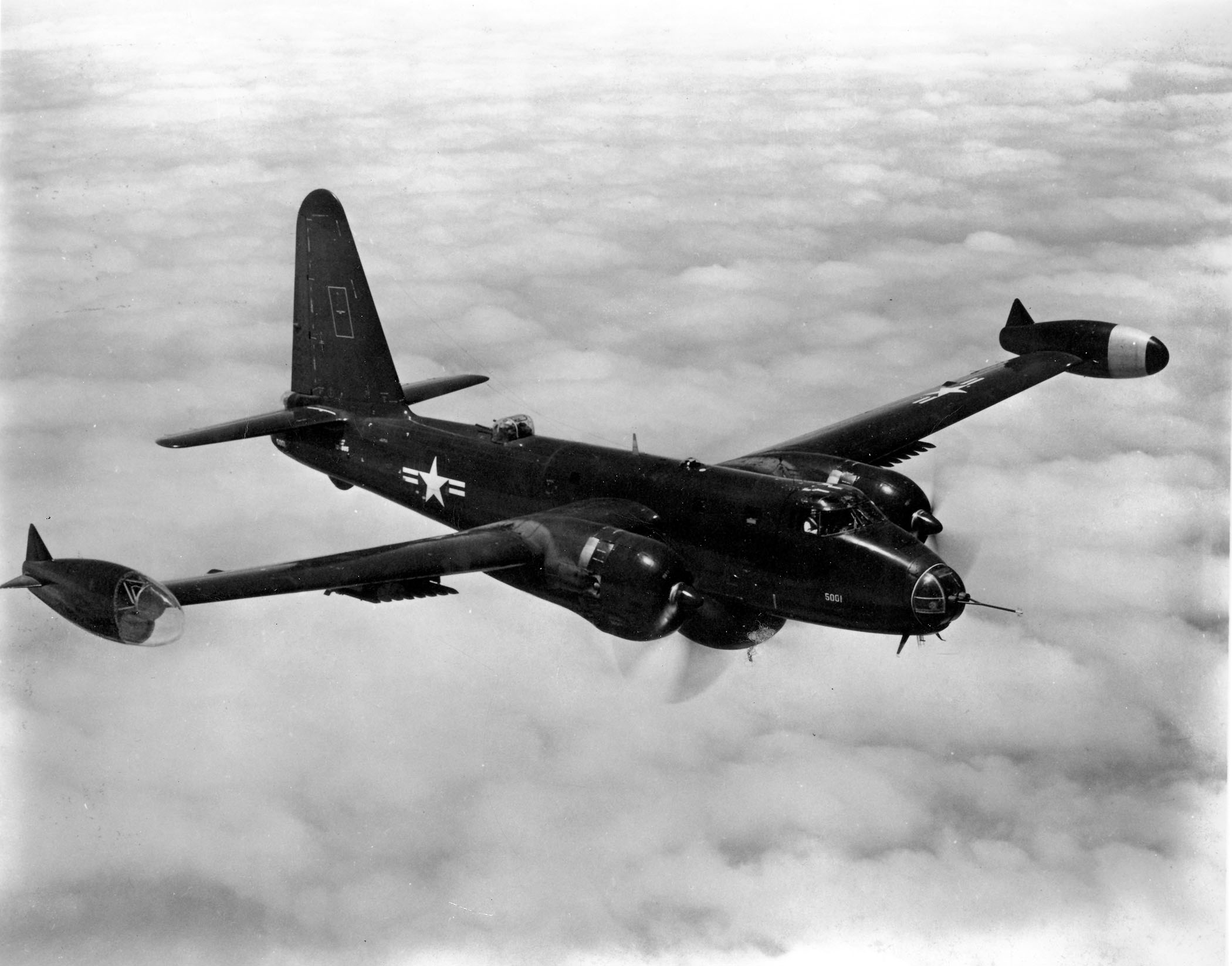
P2V-5 with nose turret in 1952. The Port Lyautey P2V-5Fs had additional turbojets mounted on nacelles where the rockets are in this photo.

The squadron continued using the six P4M-1Qs as mission aircraft. In addition, they obtained three Lockheed P2V-5Fs. The P2V-5Fs were reconfigured onsite from the standard maritime reconnaissance to similar electronic suites as the P-4Ms. Of note, the P2v-5Fs had the same dash speed capability as the P4Ms from two Westinghouse J34-WE-34 turbojets mounted on their own nacelles outboard the Wright R-3350-32W Cyclone Turbo-compound radials. The squadron used the P2V-3 for pilot training and logistics, since it was not configured for electronic reconnaissance (this became a standard squadron practice when possible; using a "bare bones airframe of one of its models for training and logistics"). The four Neptunes would serve alongside the Mercators until 1960.

In September 1956, a new and faster carrier-capable A3D-1Q Skywarrior was delivered to the squadron. The A3D-1Q, nicknamed "The Whale" was a reconfigured A3D-1 with the bomb bay closed and an electronic reconnaissance suite installed similar to those of the P4M-1Q and P2V-5F. The Whale was a carrier-capable high-wing, twin-jet aircraft with a crew of four. The A-3 was also one of the fastest non-afterburner aircraft in the US Armed Forces with a service ceiling significantly higher than the Mercators and Neptunes which gave the aircraft a greater area of coverage. The squadron also received an A3D-1 which it use like the P2V-3. Although the pilots and navigators came to the command after carrier-qualifying, the squadron operated the A-3 from land bases until the next decade unlike her sister squadron VQ-1. With the high tempo of operations and depot-level maintenance for the three models back in the continental United States (CONUS), it is unsurprising that on 1 June 1957, the command had three P4M-1Q, two A3D-1Q, two P2V-5F, one A3D-1, and one P2V-3 reported in its table of organization (TOE).

The Lebanon Crisis in 1958 on 15 July 1958, saw a P4M-1Q and aircrew shift south from Incirlik to fly out of Beirut while the US Marines and US Army were deployed there at the behest of Camille Chamoun, the President of Lebanon. VQ-2 operated out of Beirut Airport through the remainder of the summer and into the fall, departing with the withdrawal of US forces after stabilization in October 1958.

==== Homeport change ====
As a result of the Pact of Madrid, signed on 23 September 1953 by Spain and the United States, the US pledged to furnish economic and military aid to Spain. The United States, in turn, was to be permitted to construct and to utilize air and naval bases on Spanish territory (Naval Station Rota, Morón Air Base, Torrejón Air Base, and Zaragoza Air Base). By 1959, the base at Rota and its airfield had been completed to satisfy the US Navy's aviation needs. Due to its newer facilities, the Navy decided to move VQ-2 to Rota.

The relocation of the squadron to Rota began in late 1958 into the first days of 1959. The shift of the squadron CO, XO, and department heads (DHs) was completed by 14 January 1959, but it would take another year to transfer all command assets to Rota. All assets at Lyautey had to be surveyed, packed up, and moved.

During this evolution, five seven-seat A3D-2Q aircraft arrived to replace the four-seat A3D-1Qs. These new aircraft had the bulkhead between the cockpit and the bomb bay removed, the bomb bay sealed, and three more seats and equipment added in the former bay. This unarmed version (the tail gun had been removed) brought an increase in capability to the community.

==== Aircraft/aircrew losses and mishaps ====
Over the course of the decade, VQ-2 suffered the eleven aircrew fatalities and three aircraft in three mishaps:

1. On 6 January 1958, at the end of a ferry flight from Port Lyautey, via Lajes Air Base, Azores and Kindley AFB, Bermuda to NAS Norfolk, Virginia, P4M-1Q (BUNO 124373) lost an engine on approach. The aircraft crashed at 22 St. and E. Ocean Ave., Norfolk, killing four crew and injuring three civilians. Two aircrew were injured and one was uninjured.
2. On 16 October 1958, returning to Incirlik, A3D-1Q (BUNO 130356) crashed near the airfield. All four aircrew aboard were killed.

=== 1960s ===
==== Change ====
While keeping the alphanumeric designation VQ-2, ECMRON TWO was renamed Fleet Air Reconnaissance Squadron TWO (FAIRECONRON TWO) on 1 January 1960. Its sister squadron, VQ-1 was similarly renamed. On 14 January 1960, with all equipment and personnel out of Lyautey, VQ-2 officially transferred to Naval Station.

The Navy had recognized that the maintenance costs of the aging, worn P4M-1Q and P2V-5F airframes were increasingly more expensive to maintain, and these planes needed replacement. Washington opted for a larger, more capable aircraft, the Lockheed WV-2Q Warning Star. The "Willie Victors," unarmed like the A3D-2Qs, could carry a crew of twenty-six. On 26 February 1960, the first two WV-2Q arrived. By the end of the first quarter in 1960, 31 March, VQ-2'aircraft inventory were five A3D-2Q, three P2V-5F, two P4M-1Q, and two WV-2Q. The P2V-5F and P4M-1Q aircraft were soon to be phased out as all hands quickly adapted to the A3D-2Q and WV-2Q airframes. Meanwhile, the squadron continued its business of airborne electronic reconnaissance. By the summer of 1960, the Mercators and Neptunes were gone.

On 18 September 1962, the Department of Defense (DoD) initiated its Tri-Service Aircraft Designation System which replaced the 1922 USN Aircraft Designation System. The new unified system for designating all US military aircraft was a Type/Model/Series (T/M/S). With this change, the A3D-2Q became the EA-3B and the WV-2Q became the EC-121M.

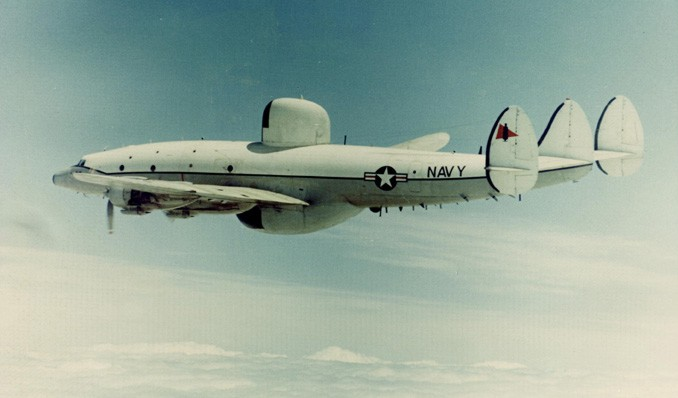
A U.S. Navy Lockheed EC-121M Warning Star of VQ-2.

==== In theater operations ====
In response to the Berlin Crisis of 1961, VQ-2 flew missions in West Germany along the border with Czechoslovakia and East Germany as well as their routine missions into the Baltic. By now these were being carried out primarily by the WV-2Qs with A3D-2Qs filling in as needed. Tensions continued to increase as the Kennedy administration and its NATO allies responded to Soviet moves in Europe.

Following the Cuban Missile Crisis was Cyprus Crisis in 1964 saw an increase in international tensions in the Eastern Mediterranean. This led to an increase in EC-121M and EA-3B presence in the Levant. Afterwards, a series of eastern Mediterranean crises provided ample opportunities for VQ-2 to perform timely reconnaissance. A major factor in the more direct tactical reconnaissance shipboard role was the rapidly growing and modernizing Soviet Navy that established a continuous presence in the Mediterranean, concurrent with the Cyprus Crisis. In response to these crises, VQ-2 started operating EA-3B detachments aboard a Mediterranean-based carriers like her sister squadron, VQ-1 did in the Pacific. In January 1965, the first planes went aboard the USS Saratoga (CVA-60). Detachments aboard provided support to the Mediterranean deployed carriers.

While operating in Vietnam and the Philippines, the political tensions in the Middle East and North Africa were building. In June 1967, armed conflict erupted into the Six-Day War where Israel defeated its enemies. The loss of the USS Liberty during the war at the hands of the IDF reaffirmed the relative safety of using aircraft for fleet reconnaissance. This incident kept the high tempo of operations in the Eastern Mediterranean despite a cessation of strife in Cyprus. The coup in Libya in 1969 combined with the ever increasing presence of the Soviet Navy to counter the presence of the NATO navies in the Mediterranean kept the command operating at a high tempo.

As the decade came to a close, VQ-2 found itself operating all over Europe from various NATO bases, from US Sixth Fleet carriers, as well as in Southeast Asia.

==== Cuban Missile Crisis ====
In October 1962 the Cuban Missile Crisis developed. Since the Navy had no comparable reconnaissance assets available in CONUS, VQ-2 deployed a number of EA-3B and an EC-121M aircraft to NAS Key West to provide those services around Cuba. After this major superpower crisis was defused, the assets returned to Spain. The squadron's rapidity and flexibility demonstrated in Florida kept it very busy when it returned to Europe where it resumed missions in the Mediterranean, Baltic, and central Europe.

==== Vietnam ====
During the Vietnam War, the squadron deployed detachments to augment VQ-1's support of US Navy operations in and around Vietnam under CINCPACFLT operational control. In late summer 1965, VQ-2 established DET ALFA at NAS Cubi Point, Philippines. Sorties were routinely flown by EA-3Bs and EC-121Ms into the theater to support US Navy combat operations in Vietnam. After its sister squadron, VQ-1, established its DET BRAVO flying from Da Nang Air Base in South Vietnam in 1966, VQ-2 EA-3Bs joined them operating almost exclusively from there as VQ-2 DET BRAVO. From both locations, VQ-2 aircraft provided continuous electronic reconnaissance capability over the area, including the Ho Chi Minh Trail and Gulf of Tonkin. As combat operations from CTF 77 on Yankee Station into North Vietnamese airspace increased, VQ-2 joined VQ-1 in deploying EA-3Bs to the attack carriers in theater. VQ-2 ceased operations from Da Nang in 1969, but continued to deploy to the aircraft carriers and Cubi Point.

==== Aircraft/aircrew losses and mishaps ====
Over the course of the decade, VQ-2 suffered the fifty-two aircrew fatalities and five aircraft in seven mishaps.

1. Two days after the official move, on 16 January 1960, P4M-1Q (BUNO 124365) crashed into a mountainside at 9,000 feet om approach to crashed on approach to Incirlik AB. The crew had been flying in to relieve the detachment that had been operating there. All sixteen aircrew were killed.
2. On 22 May 1962, a WV-2Q (BUNO 131390) staged at Wiesbaden Air Base, took off from Fürstenfeldbruck Air Base on a training flight. Inflight, the rear cargo door opened while at 18,000 feet. The flight crew declared an emergency and diverted to Munich-Riem Airport. To observers on the ground, WV-2Q seemed to explode with the tail separating from the main fuselage over Markt Schwaben, 17 km south of Munich Airport. The main fuselage and tail section crashed several hundred yards apart in fields southwest of the town. The aircraft was totally destroyed killing all twenty-two Navy and four Army aircrew. Debris and documents were scattered on an area over 65 km2.
3. On 28 May 1966, an EA-3B (BUNO 142257) of DET ALFA, ran into a typhoon enroute Vietnam. The aircraft iced up, the engines flamed out, and it stalled into a spin. The pilot ordered the crew to bail out. The four aircrew in the aft compartment bailed. Just as the crew chief was getting ready to go, the pilot got a restart and recovered out of the spin. The aircraft with the pilot, navigator and crew chief made it back to DET ALFA. The other four perished with only one body recovered and the personal effects of the other three.
4. On 3 November 1966, an EA-3B (BUNO 146458) struck the water aft of the ship inbound to a night recovery on the USS Independence (CVA-62) in the central Mediterranean off Sicily. All six aircrew aboard were lost at sea.
5. Returning from a mission along the East German/Czech border in the during the "Prague Spring" of 1968, an EA-3B was entering the landing pattern at Ramstein AFB when it had a slat malfunction pitching nose-up turn. With the plane seeming to enter a stall, the pilot signalled for a crew bail out. The four aircrew in the aft compartment bailed but at 1200 feet altitude. Again, just as the crew chief was getting ready to go, the slat suddenly operated allowing a recovery at Ramstein. Although bailing out at a low altitude, the four back end crew survived.
6. On 4 June 1968, an EA-3B (BUNO 142670), flown by the new (by barely beyond a month) squadron CO, CDR T.E. Daum, crashed on takeoff from Rota on a flight to a conference in Naples, Italy. The Whale lost an engine just after takeoff and descended slowly until hitting the ground on the down slope of a hill, cartwheeling into a sugar beet field approximately one mile east of the Rota runway. CDR Daum and three of his department heads who were aboard were killed. The crew chief and another petty officer survived. Two squadron junior officers on their way in to the command were the first people to the crash site.
7. In the summer of 1968, a rocket attack on Danang damaged the nose and cockpit of EA-3B (BUNO 144848). DET BRAVO shipped the airframe to CONUS for repairs via sealift. In rough weather in Tokyo Bay on 14 December 1968, the plane broke loose from its tie downs and was lost overboard.

=== 1970s ===
==== Continued change ====
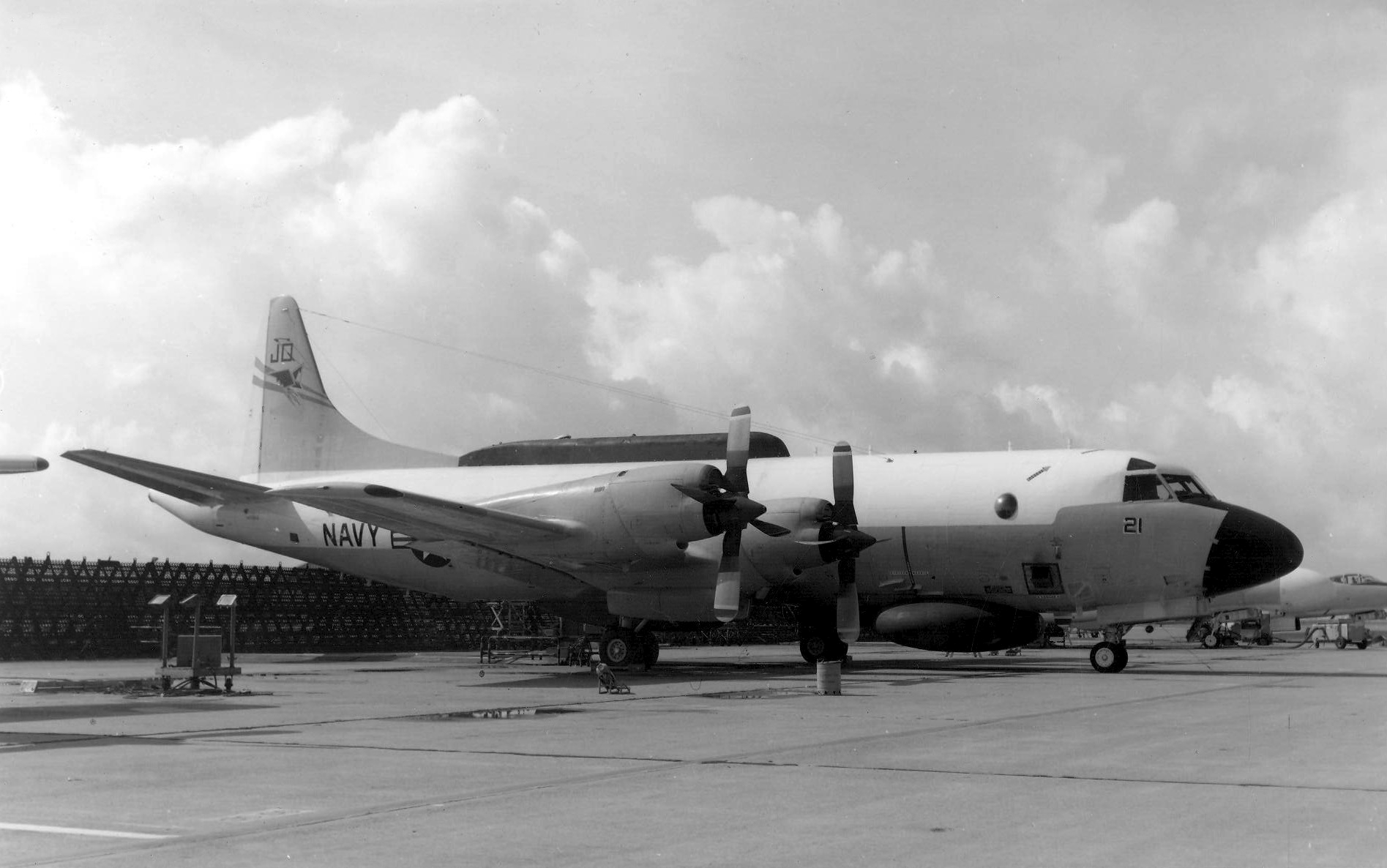
EP-3E Aries of VQ-2 parked in 1971

In the second decade of the squadron's forward basing in Spain, the American presence in Rota saw the relocation of the destroyer squadron that had been based in Athens arrive just as the submarine squadron returned to CONUS. The greater availability of assignments at the Aviation Intermediate Maintenance Depot (AIMD) across the hangar from the squadron saw an increase in "homesteading" (remaining at one location as long as one's career would allow) by enlisted personnel as the rate of intermarriage with Spanish host nationals increased.

The 1970s also saw an increase in the number of women assigned to the squadron. Through the decade, female officers and sailors provided valuable support at the squadron's homeport. As the number of women grew, the command took over an entire floor in one of the barracks on base for its enlisted women.

The host nation was also changing. In November 1975, Franco died and Juan Carlos I ascended the throne. Spain began a new era of democracy and engagement with the rest of Western Europe.

The EC-121Ms' career in the command had been a second lease on life since the airframes when acquired by VQ-2On 31 July 1971 were over ten years old. These twenty-year plus planes were failing to meet the reconnaissance demands placed upon the squadron. On 31 July 1971, the squadron received its first delivery of the EP-3E Aries aircraft. These EP-3s were converted from P-3A and P-3B airframes. This relatively newer airframe gave the squadron a more reliable platform due to its commonality with the VP P-3s, the availability of parts, and the lower flight hours on the aircraft. It would take five years until the final EP-3E arrived in Rota. By the end of 1974, enough Aries were in Rota to let VQ-2 to stop operating its EC-121Ms.

In May 1972, VQ-2 also received a TA-3B and a UP-3A to use for crew training and logistics. These aircraft flew regularly from Rota on local flights as well as airlifts and parts runs to various detachments ashore and afloat. Of note, after 1974, the detachment at Incirlik, relocated to Athens. Due to Greece's popularity with British vacationers, the squadron saw an increase in intermarriage between its sailors and British nationals as well as with host nation citizens.

==== Continued crisis ====
In this decade, the Cold War continued with a lessening of tensions with the Soviet Union due to the Nixon administration's policy of détente. While this reduced the frequency of operations in the North Atlantic, Baltic, and Germany, the decade was frequently marked by international crises in the Mediterranean. Notable among these were the fallout from the 1969 coup in Libya, the 1970 Jordan Crisis, the 1973 Yom Kippur War, the 1974 crisis in Cyprus, and the multiple flare ups in Lebanon. The US Sixth Fleet and its NATO allies maintained a presence offshore in response to all these crises.

Despite détente, the Soviet Union was conducting a program of providing significant amounts of military hardware to its client states of Libya, Syria (which had intervened with troops in Lebanon as the bulk of an Arab Deterrent Force), and Egypt. At the same time, the Soviet Navy continued increasing its presence in the Mediterranean. While Egypt left the Soviet fold after the Yom Kippur War, the buildups on the levane and North Africa made the Central and Eastern Mediterranean hot spots for VQ-2's monitoring of Soviet naval units as well as activities ashore. As a result, high tempo operations lasted through the decade despite the overall drawdown of the US military after Vietnam.

In the Eastern Mediterranean and Levant, Palestinian terrorist attacks into Israel from Lebanon ratcheted up the stress in Arab/Israeli relations. As the attacks continued, the squadron increased its patrols along the Levant. The situation exploded into the Israeli invasion of Lebanon. After the Israeli withdrawal from the Litani River, the defeated PLO was replaced by Hezbollah as Israel's main antagonist in Lebanon. Hezbollah received significant backing from Iran as well as Syria which still had troops in the country.

In 1979, the Iranian Revolution saw an increased US presence in the Persian Gulf and Indian Ocean. In response, the Navy maintained at least one carrier battle group in the vicinity of the Gulf. The seizing of hostages at the embassy in Tehran further exacerbated tensions leading to VQ-2 manning of Indian Ocean carrier and Diego Garcia detachments alongside VQ-1. This manning would continue until the third phase of the Lebanese Civil War in 1982.

==== Aircraft/aircrew losses and mishaps ====
Although the decade was less lethal than its predecessor, VQ-2 suffered the twelve aircrew fatalities and lost three aircraft in mishaps.

1. On 26 February 1970, EA-3B (BUNO 144851) was lost while operating from USS Franklin D. Roosevelt in the Mediterranean. The catapult system malfunctioned in mid-stroke, also known as a 'cold cat," resulting in the Whale “dribbling” off the bow and being run over by the carrier. Four of the crew members died in the accident.
2. On 8 March 1974, EA-3B (BUNO 142257) was lost while operating from the USS America in the Mediterranean. A cable parted in the arresting gear when the tailhook caught the wire. The pilot who had begun retarding the throttles to idle as per standard procedure, slammed them forward managing to regain enough airspeed to get the plane off the angle and ditch it in the water off to the port side. This allowed the plane to avoid being run over by the ship. The America's plane guard helicopter recovered all the aircrew. The airframe continued to float and was deemed a hazard to navigation forcing the ship to have one of its A-7A's strafe it to sink it.
3. On 9 July 1974, the squadron suffered another A-3 loss when its VIP transport-configured A-3, a TA-3B (BUNO 144863) crashed at Capodichino in Naples, Italy on approach. All eight aircrew perished in the crash.

Throughout the remainder of the 1970s, the command suffered no aircraft losses.

=== 1980s ===
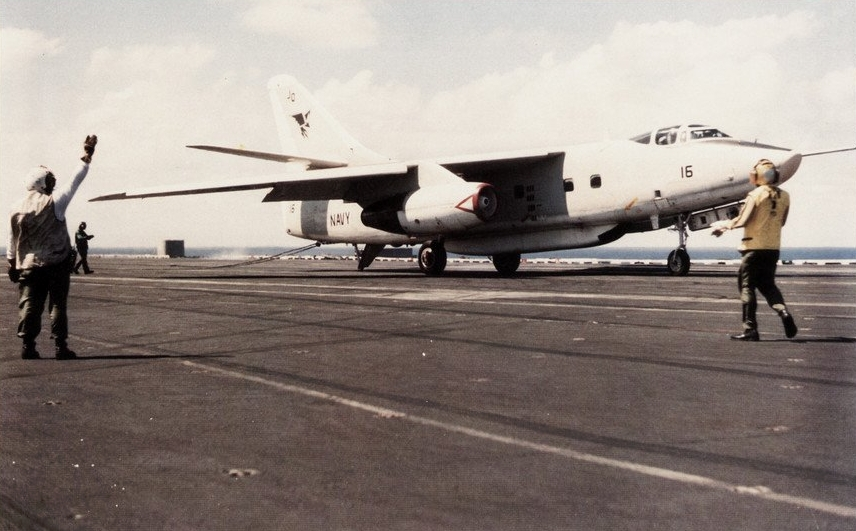
EA-3B VQ-2 after landing on USS Saratoga in 1986

==== Constant change ====
The 1980s saw VQ-2 continue flying the EP-3E and EA-3B aircraft at a high tempo. The squadron maintained a permanent detachment in Athens, but unlike its sister squadron, VQ-1 who had a permanently assigned Officer-in-Charge (OIC) at its Atsugi detachment, VQ-2 rotated its OIC with the aircrews. Throughout the decade, the squadron regular had detachments at Mildenhall, Schleswig, Keflavik, Machrihanish, and Sigonella. The squadron also manned detachments on all Sixth Fleet carriers until October 1987, when the Navy deemed the A-3 no longer capable of safe, routine carrier operations after multiple mishaps with high loss of life in the active and reserve A-3 community.

Women continued to play an ever greater and important role in squadron operations. As the decade progressed, women routinely deployed to land-based detachments. Another milestone came at the end of the decade when the authorization for women to fly in combat support aircraft was extended to the EP-3E. Female pilots, NFOs, and aircrew began arriving and deploying in the Spring of 1989.

==== Eastern and Central Mediterranean hot spots ====
At the beginning of the decade, the command had detachments covering the Mediterranean, the Baltic, the Indian Ocean, and the Persian Gulf. Over the following years, the squadron would have its most dynamic and productive period during peacetime operations.

The Soviet Union's reaction to the start of the Solidarity trade union in Poland created tensions which combined with the Soviet Invasion of Afghanistan to effectively end détente. Missions into the Baltic increased as a result. With détente over, VQ-2 saw a buildup in the Soviet Navy's activity level and modernization, all of which kept the squadron's assets stretched thin. Also as result of the end of détente, there was an increase of Soviet and Cuban activity in the Western Hemisphere. Poor relations with the new pro-Soviet Sandinista regime saw detachments run out Panama as well as Key West.

The resolution of the Hostage Crisis and the onset of the Iran–Iraq War lessened Iranian focus on the US which ended the Diego Garcia detachment, but the command would still have assets in the region when an East Coast carrier relieved a Pacific Fleet carrier the Indian Ocean. The terrorist threat from Iran would continue throughout the region.

In June 1982, after repeated terrorist attacks launched from Lebanon, Israel launched another invasion of Lebanon. The Israeli Air Force also launched an air campaign in the Bekaa that gored the Syrian air force and air defence system. With the IDF reaching Beirut, a diplomatic solution ended the conflict by removing the PLO to Tunisia.

VQ-2 was awarded the Navy Expeditionary Medal for participation in the Beirut evacuation and operations in the vicinity of Libya during Operation El Dorado Canyon, 12–17 April 1986.

==== Aircraft/aircrew losses and mishaps ====
On 25 January 1987, an EA-3B crashed on the USS Nimitz killing all seven crew members.

=== 1990s ===
In the summer of 1990, the squadron provided electronic reconnaissance during the evacuation of 2000 non-combatant personnel from war-stricken Liberia in operation Sharp Edge.

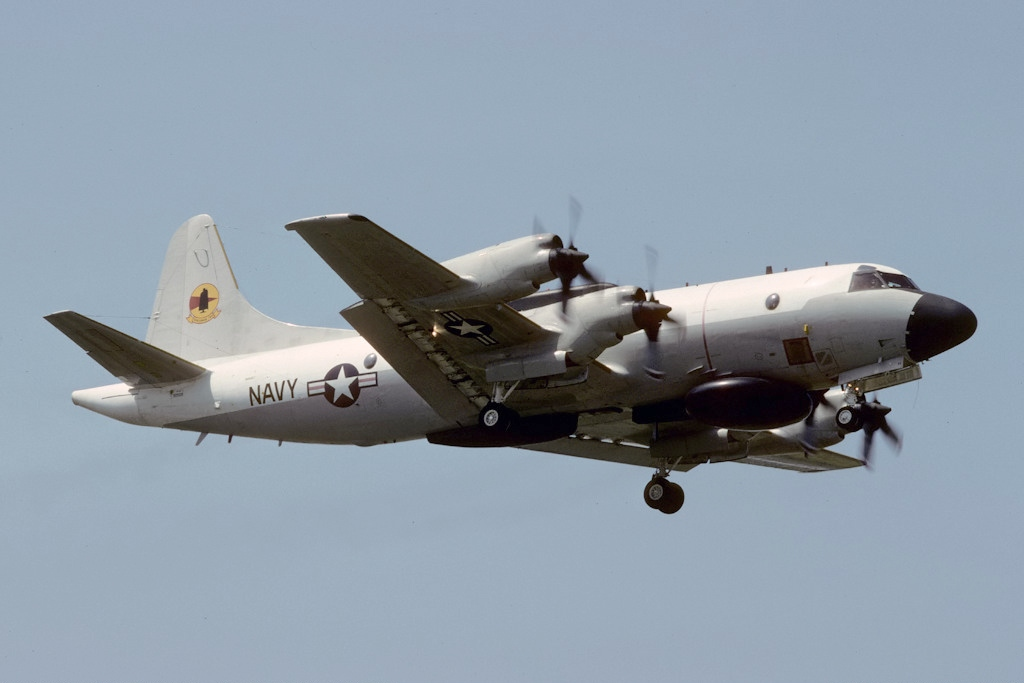
EP-3E of VQ-2 based at Rota, Spain, seen arriving for RIAT '92.

From August 1990 to April 1991, VQ-2 provided combat reconnaissance during operations Desert Shield/Desert Storm, Proven Force, and Provide Comfort.

On 29 June 1991, the first EP-3E Aries II aircraft arrived in Rota and on 20 September 1991, the squadron retired the EA-3B Skywarrior the same year.

Starting in July 1992, VQ-2 flew support missions with Operations Deny Flight, Provide Promise, Sharp Guard, Joint Endeavor, Decisive Endeavor, and Deliberate Guard providing combat reconnaissance and intelligence to NATO and United Nations forces in the Former Yugoslavia.

As of 1997, VQ-2 operated four EP-3E Aries II aircraft and two P-3C Orion aircraft from its home-base at Rota and two-plane detachment at Naval Support Activity Souda Bay, Crete.

In March 1997, VQ-2 provided electronic reconnaissance during the evacuation of non-combatant personnel from Albania following unrest from a failed pyramid savings scheme during Operation Silver Wake.

=== 2000s ===
VQ-2 relocated from NS Rota, Spain, to NAS Whidbey Island, effective 1 September 2005. The relocation of VQ-2's six aircraft and 450 Sailors to the United States was in keeping with the Navy's ongoing transformation of forces in Europe and helped reduce costs and eliminate redundancies throughout its force structure worldwide. The move co-located the squadron with VQ-1, already based at NAS Whidbey Island, and realized efficiency through the consolidation of personnel deployment practices, aircraft maintenance practices, and aircrew training for these unique Navy squadrons.

=== 2010s ===
The squadron was disestablished on 22 May 2012 ending 57 years of service. The last squadron commander was Commander Mark Stockfish.

== See also ==
- Andalusia
- Cádiz
- Puerto de Santa Maria
- US Naval Forces Africa

=== Aircraft articles ===
- Consolidated PB4Y-2 Privateer
- Douglas EA-3B Skywarrior
- Lockheed EC-121M Warning Star
- Lockheed EP-3E Orion Aries
- Lockheed EP-2E Neptune
- Martin P4M-1Q Mercator
