= Royal Fair of Algeciras =

Royal Fair of Algeciras Feria Real de Algeciras
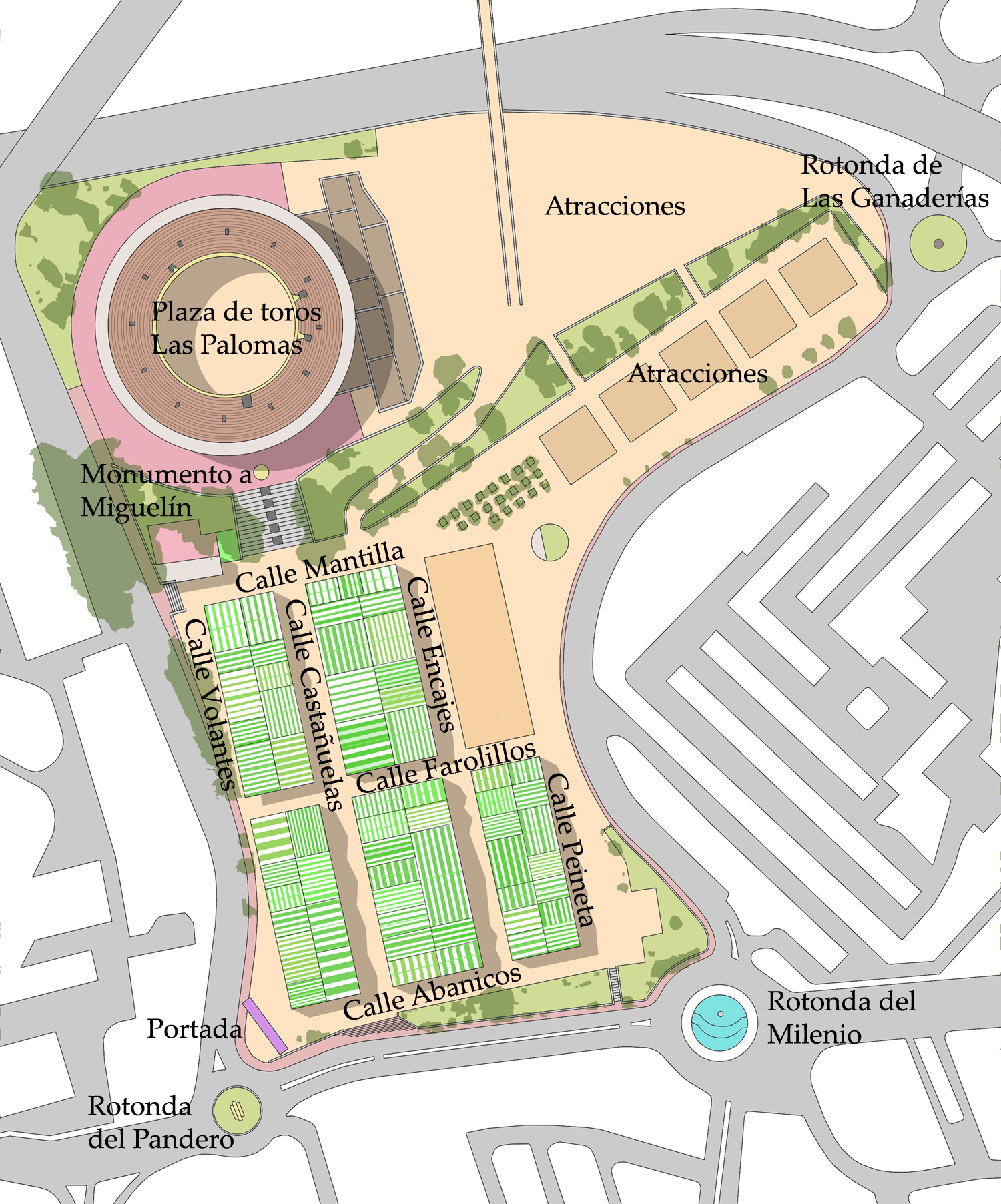
- Dates: Ten nights and nine days in June, ending on a Sunday
- Location: Algeciras
- Coordinates: 36°08′24.5″N 5°27′26.7″W
- Country: Spain
- Years active: 1850–1914, 1919–1939, 1946–2019, 2022–
- Founded: 1850
- Website: http://www.algeciras.es/es/ciudad/fiestas/feriareal/

The Royal Fair of Algeciras (Spanish: Feria Real de Algeciras) is the most important annual festival in the Spanish city of Algeciras, held in June each year. Since it was established in 1850 as a cattle market, the fair and the fairground in which it is held have become popular attractions for the people of Algeciras and the surrounding towns of the Campo de Gibraltar. It has moved several times since its establishment and is now held in the Las Colinas area, where Algeciras's Las Palomas bullring is also located.

== History ==
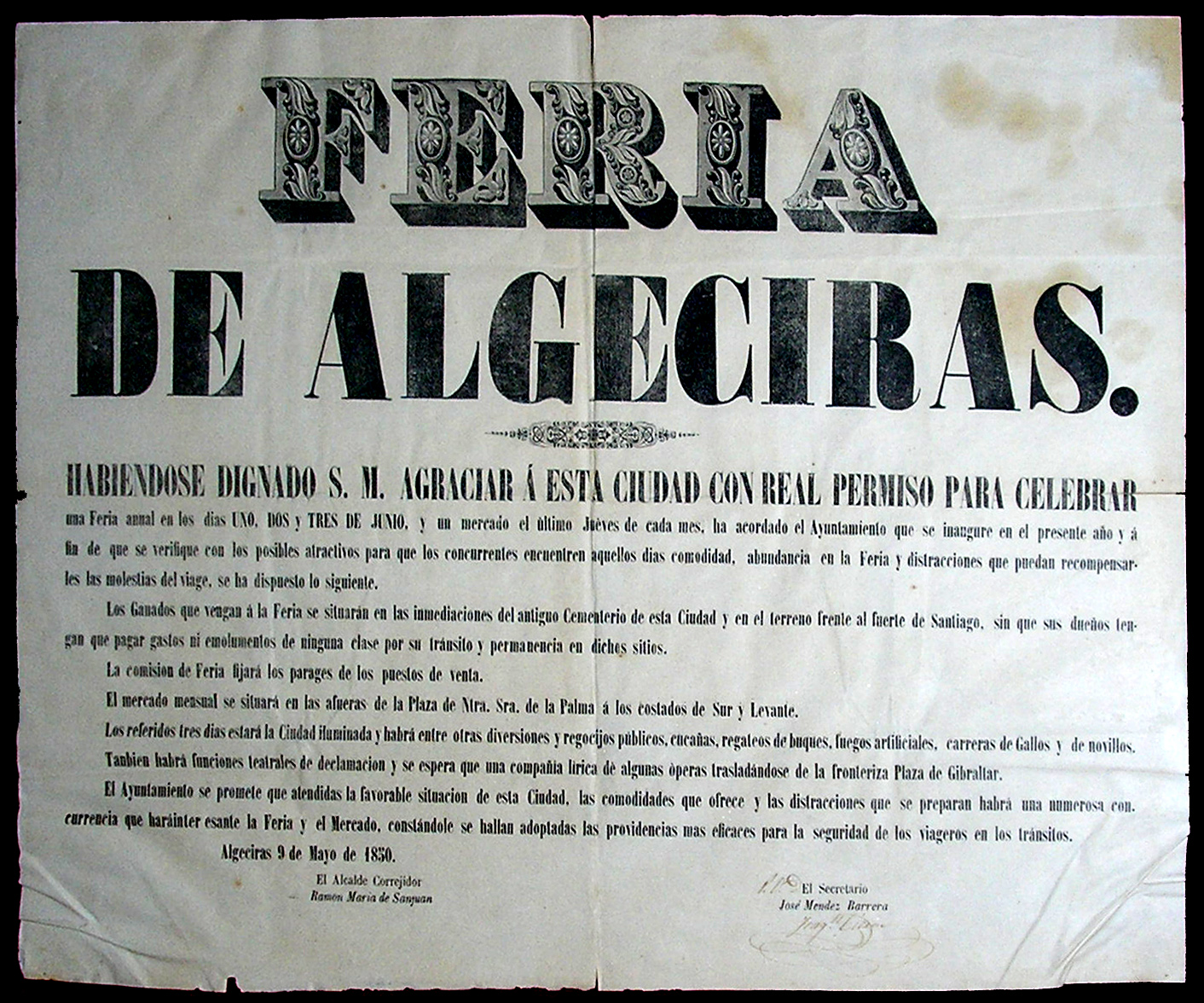
Poster advertising the first fair, held in 1850

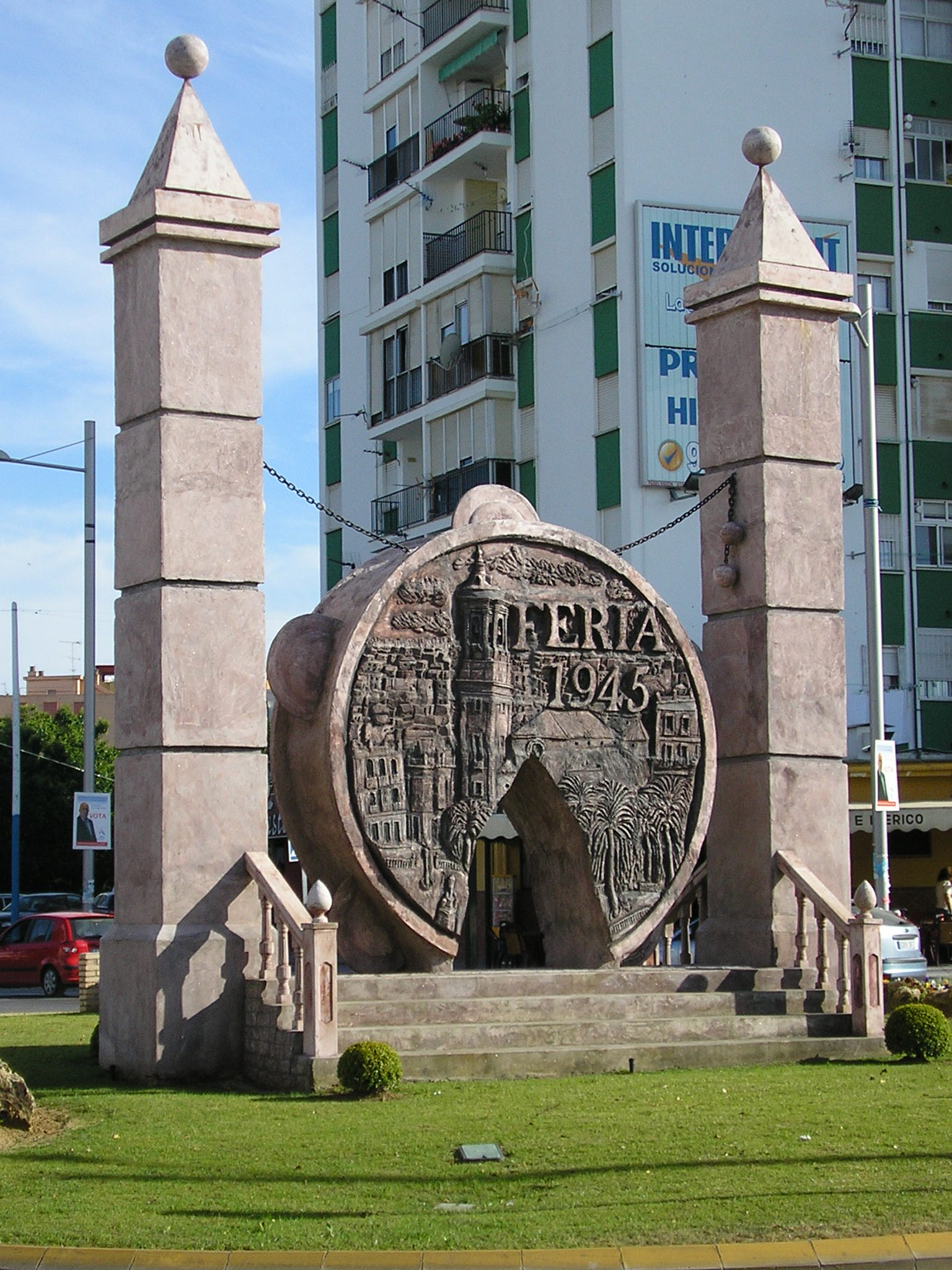
Roundabout of the Tambourine outside the fairground, representing the 1945 fair

The Royal Fair was established under a royal warrant in June 1850 as a cattle show held in the area known as El Calvario, to the north of the city in the direction of San Roque. The area was devoid of buildings at the time and was the starting point of a popular pilgrimage known as Los Pinos. According to the poster and various contemporary writers, the first fair included fireworks, ship regattas, horse performances and even a bullfight called the toro de la veta, which was banned a few years later. In addition to the entertainments and the cattle show, goods and craftworks from all parts of the Campo de Gibraltar could be bought at the fair.

The fair soon became very popular both in the city and neighboring towns. Some of the temporary stalls erected for the annual show became permanent fixtures, which citizens of Algeciras visited on summer evenings. Seven years after the first fair was held, Algeciras's first permanent bullring was constructed in its vicinity but had to be torn down after a few years because of problems with its construction. The La Perseverancia bullring was built to replace it in 1866. In 1877 a promenade called the Alameda de la Feria was constructed and had to be extended in 1914 to accommodate the number of people using it.

No fair was held from 1915 to 1918, 1940 to 1945, nor since 2020.

The site of the fair was moved in 1957 to a field north of the Parque María Cristina, due to pressure from development on its former location in El Calvario. The fairground was entered through the park grounds, which were illuminated at night to facilitate drivers and horse riders.

== Current fairground ==
In 1967, the Royal Fair moved again, once more due to the demands on land in Algeciras, to a then-undeveloped area on the outskirts of the city next to the Carretera de Málaga, in the area called Las Colinas. The old fairground was completely built over, as was a large part of the park, which had the Avenida de Francisco Franco (now the Avenida de las Fuerzas Armadas) built across its western side. The new Las Palomas bullring was built adjacent to the fairground in 1969; it would eventually replace La Perseverancia, which was demolished in 1976. The fair's new location was heavily criticised at the time, as it was thought by many to be too far from the city, but the continued expansion of Algeciras has meant that it is now surrounded by built-up areas within the city limits.

The fair is regarded as the most important festival in the area and, according to the mayor of Algeciras, is "a landmark not only in the Campo de Gibraltar, but in [the whole of] Andalusia". It is normally held over ten days in June with one of its days being a local holiday. Due to the city's economic problems, the 2013 fair was three days shorter than usual as a cost-cutting measure.
