= Ángel Teruel =

Spanish bullfighter (1950–2021)

Personal information
- Nationality: Spanish
- Born: Ángel Teruel Peñalver; 20 February 1950 Madrid, Spain
- Died: 17 December 2021 (aged 71) Cáceres, Spain
- Monument: Commemorative tile at Las Ventas
- Home town: Madrid
- Occupation: Bullfighter
- Years active: 1966–1982, 1983–1985, 2012
- Spouse: Lidia García González
- Children: Ángel Teruel García
- Relative: José Luis "Pepe" Teruel Peñalver (brother)
- Other interests: Raising fighting bulls

Ángel Teruel Peñalver (Spanish: [ˈaŋxel teɾˈwel peɲalˈβeɾ]; 20 February 1950 – 17 December 2021), professionally known as Ángel Teruel, was a Spanish bullfighter, the star of the escalafón taurino (bullfighters' rankings) in the 1960s and early 1970s.

== Early years ==
Born in Madrid's Embajadores neighbourhood, Teruel worked as a boy in his parents' family business, a roundabout, on the Calle de Ferraz, across the street from the Dominguín household, a family of illustrious bullfighters at that time. Teruel learnt while still a child to use the cape and the muleta together with the Dominguín children, for there was no bullfighting background in his own family.

Nonetheless, Teruel's brother Pepe became a matador, too, although before he himself did.

== Bullfighting career ==
Teruel's début as a novillero (novice bullfighter who fights yearling bulls) without picadores was on 19 May 1966 at the old Vista Alegre (or Vistalegre) bullring in Madrid, in the so-called Corridas de la Oportunidad, where he found himself before a yearling bull bearing Agapito Blanco's brand. He was awarded two ears for his efforts. His début with picadores took place on 29 January 1967 in Fuengirola (other sources say 22 January) with billing shared with Miguel Márquez and Jacobo Belmonte, and with bulls supplied by Núñez Guerra or Don Diego Romero (depending on the source). This fight earned him three ears.

Scarcely had Teruel fought 20 novilladas than the day came for his alternativa, which was 30 June 1967 at the Burgos bullring during Saint Peter's and Saint Paul's Bullfighting Fair, and the bullfights there were televised that afternoon. His "godfather", Santiago Martín, "El Viti", let him slay the afternoon's first bull, whose name was Cazuela and who was from the Manuela Agustina López Flores ranch (elsewhere named as Don Samuel Flores y Doña Manuela Agustina López Flores). Black-chestnut he was, weighing 487 kg; Teruel cut one of his ears off as a trophy. The day's highlight, however, was the second bull that he fought, the afternoon's sixth, from the Amelia Pérez Tabernero ranch; Teruel cut both this bull's ears, along with his tail. Bearing witness to Teruel's alternativa was the Seville bullfighter Pedrín Benjumea.

At Saint Isidore's Fair the next year, on 12 May, he presented himself at Madrid's Las Ventas bullring to have his alternativa confirmed, sharing billing that afternoon with "El Viti" and José Fuentes from Linares. The bulls waiting in the pens bore the Atanasio Fernández brand, and the one that Teruel fought for his confirmation was Yegüero, weighing 501 kg and all black but for the crotch. Teruel got both Yegüero's ears. Together with the other two ears that he cut from the afternoon's sixth bull, named Mallorquino, his bullfighting skill and showmanship earned him a ride on his fellow bullfighters' shoulders out through the Great Gate.

During the off-season, Teruel starred in Rafael Gil's film Sangre en el ruedo ("Blood in the Bullring" is its English title).

On 14 June 1969, Teruel was one of three bullfighters who shared the billing at the inaugural corrida at the Plaza de toros de Las Palomas in Algeciras, the others being Miguelín and Paquirri.

On 9 January 1971, while appearing at a corrida in Manizales, Colombia, Teruel suffered a setback in his career when the bull that he was fighting (supplied by the Dosgutiérrez ranch) was sent back to the pens after Teruel failed to slay him after the bullring's warning signals. To make up for it, he gave a bull from the Félix Rodríguez ranch as a gift.

An elegant bullfighter with the cape, and with great mettle with the muleta, Teruel's career shone at a great many bullrings both in Spain and Latin America. He was the "Castilian" who was liked most of all in Seville, as witnessed by his 29 paseíllos at the Maestranza, even if the bullring where he had his most triumphs was Las Ventas: 33 afternoons, 18 ears, and 4 times being borne shoulder-high across the Great Gate's threshold. In Peru, he was quite an idol, being considered "Torero de Lima" ("Lima's bullfighter") after announcing seven seasons at the Fair of the Lord of Miracles. Twice, in 1969 and 1970, he was awarded the Golden Scapular of the Lord of Miracles there. On 27 February 1972, in Lima, La Prensa's bullfighting news bulletin reported "(...) two outfits will be worn on the Sunday by the bullfighter to slay the six Mexican bulls...after the third bull, Ángel will come out onto the bullfighting ground wearing a white and black costume which will cause a sensation". That bullfighting outfit had been designed by the painter Pablo Picasso, a costume that would later be left as a souvenir to a Lima club. The six Mexican bulls to which the newspaper article alluded were reddish-brown ones (bureles) from the Mexican ranch Mimihuapan. Teruel made up for his lacklustre performance in Colombia a year earlier by being the only matador to appear at this corrida. He slew all six bulls and cut a total of four ears and one tail.

That same year, Teruel appeared in 35 corridas in Spain, too, but only in one or two in 1973 (sources differ), choosing to withdraw from the profession that year, disenchanted as he was with some businessmen's attitudes. His "provisional" retirement did not last long, though, and the next year, he once again donned the suit of lights with great success, fighting bulls in 23 corridas, shining brightly among which were his appearances at Bilbao and Zaragoza.

The 1975 bullfighting season saw Teruel don the suit of lights no fewer than sixty-two times, but it was marred by a ligament rupture that he suffered late in July, forcing him out of the bullring until late September. Even so, he still had time to post good successes in Logroño, Talavera de la Reina, Toledo and Zaragoza.

After a string of triumphs in the 1976 bullfighting season, notably those at the Seville Fair and at Saint Isidore's Fair (Feria de San Isidro) in Madrid (where he faced bulls from the particularly fierce Miura line), Teruel consequently saw an upswing in the number of contracts that he was awarded, eventually rising to seventy-five.

That same year took Teruel once again to Latin America, where he was rather badly injured by a bull at the Acho bullring in Lima while he was alternating with Paco Camino and Ricardo Bustamante, fighting four bulls supplied by La Viña and two by Salamanca. This was only the beginning of a streak of cogidas that Teruel would sustain. Indeed, on 29 June 1977, he was seriously wounded by a bull bearing the Mercedes Pérez-Tabernero brand at Burgos, and on 19 July that same year, at Mont-de-Marsan, France, he was injured again. On 11 September, however, came an even worse blow when a bull from the José y Francisco Ortega Sánchez ranch gave Teruel an extremely serious goring at the edge of his anus. This happened while he was sharing the billing with Luis Francisco Esplá and Christian Montcouquiol "Nimeño II" at Aranda de Duero, and it necessitated two operations at the Bullfighters' Sanatorium (Sanatorio de Toreros) in Madrid. He nevertheless took part in 38 bullfighting engagements that year, which rose to 57 the next.

In the late 1970s and early 1980s, Teruel held a prominent place in the escalafón with important triumphs like the one that he achieved at Fallas at Valencia's bullring in 1979, earning himself the champion's prize for the series. That season saw Teruel's appearance at 57 corridas, which was followed in 1980 by 41, and although they were fewer in number, they did include one engagement in Burgos on 28 June at which he reaped three ears from Marqués de Albayda-brand bulls on a bill shared with Paquirri and Curro Vázquez. That triumph also won him the Provincial Deputation's trophy for the best bullfight. Further engagements that year were likewise very successful: four ears from Molero Brothers bulls came Teruel's way on 3 August at Valdepeñas while fighting alongside Curro Vázquez and Mario Triana; two days later at Plasencia, he got three ears from the Miguel Higuero bulls that he slew, appearing together with Joaquín Bernadó and "El Cordobés"; and on 29 August came his best result, with bulls from the Jiménez Prieto ranch yielding up to Teruel not only four ears but also one tail at Almería, where he was sharing the engagement with Curro Vázquez and Antonio Rubio "Macandro". The next interruption in his bullfighting career came between 1982 and 1983, until his retirement in the 1985 season, which itself was interrupted, albeit only by his participation in two events in 2012: in Soria on 1 July, and in Colmenar Viejo on 27 August.

As skilful and brave as Teruel was with the cape, the muleta, and the sword, he was also a good banderillero. His power, elegance, and ease before the bull were for years his main weapons in the struggle to keep himself high up on the Spanish escalafón taurino.

== Later years ==
On 15 May 2019, Teruel went on to join the list of important bullfighters at the Las Ventas bullring's "Hall of Fame", with a commemorative tile recognizing his lengthy and successful career. The tile bears the inscription "A Ángel Teruel Peñalver, en el 50 aniversario de su confirmación de alternativa. Torero de Madrid, que paseó por los ruedos del mundo su clase, temple y poderío" ("To Ángel Teruel Peñalver, on the 50th anniversary of the confirmation of his alternativa. Bullfighter from Madrid, who walked his class, mettle, and power through the world's bullfighting grounds"). Teruel spent his last years at his farm in Bohonal de Ibor, Cáceres, where he had a fighting bull breeding business.

== Personal life and death ==
Teruel was married to Domingo Dominguin's granddaughter Lidia García González, mother to his son Ángel Teruel García, also a bullfighter.

Teruel died at the age of 71 on 17 December 2021 at a hospital in Cáceres from respiratory failure brought on by the many cardiological procedures that he had undergone in his last years.
