= Joaquín Rodríguez Ortega =

Spanish bullfighter (1903–1984)

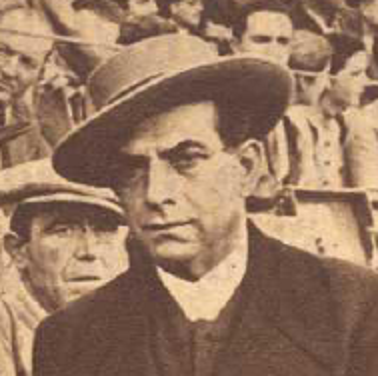
- Rodríguez in 1953

Personal information
- Nickname: Cagancho
- Nationality: Spanish
- Born: 17 February 1903 Seville, Spain
- Died: 1 January 1984 (aged 80) Mexico City, Mexico
- Monuments: Tile in Seville; Street in Tarancón
- Occupation: Bullfighter
- Years active: 1923–1964
- Agent: Domingo Dominguín (apoderado)
- Spouse: Salud (?) Sánchez (Note: The paternal surname "Sánchez" is inferred from her son's maternal surname. The rest of her name is proving elusive, although "Salud" would seem to be her given name (source not thoroughly reliable). A picture of her appears among the external links below.)
- Children: Joaquín Rodríguez Sánchez; Amparo Rodríguez Sánchez
- Parents: Joaquín Rodríguez Vargas (father); Amparo Ortega Bermúdez (mother)
- Relatives: Manuel Rodríguez García "Cagancho" (grandfather); Francisco Vega de los Reyes (cousin); Rafael Vega de los Reyes (cousin)
- Other interests: film acting

Joaquín Rodríguez Ortega (Spanish: [xoaˈkin roðˈɾiɣeθ oɾˈteɣa]; 17 February 1903 – 1 January 1984), professionally known as Cagancho (Spanish: [kaˈɣantʃo]), was a Spanish bullfighter much of whose career was spent in Mexico, although he did sometimes perform in his native Spain, and one of his performances there, in Almagro, Ciudad Real in 1927 even gave rise to a now well known expression in the Spanish language. Rodríguez also found himself appraised in English when he and his craft were described by Ernest Hemingway in his non-fiction work Death in the Afternoon, along with many other Spanish bullfighters of the early 20th century.

== Early life ==
Rodríguez was born on 17 February 1903 at Calle Evangelista no. 4 in Seville's Triana neighbourhood into a family that had a long line of Romani artists. His father was Joaquín Rodríguez Vargas, a blacksmith, and his mother was Amparo Ortega Bermúdez, a cigar seller. Along with his cousin, Francisco Vega de los Reyes, "Gitanillo de Triana" ("Little Gypsy from Triana"), he began learning about bullfighting. Rodríguez did not have a difficult childhood and did not grow up in poverty; so he did not find himself drawn towards bullfighting out of economic need, as was so for so many would-be bullfighters at that time. Instead, bullfighting seemed for him to be almost inborn, although it was helped along by his friendship with Francisco. He was determined to fight bulls professionally. He slew his first cow at the age of 15 at the Venta de Guadaíra. He began going to local bullfighting events, where he developed what would become his trade.

== Nickname ==
Rodríguez inherited his nickname "Cagancho" from his grandfather Manuel Rodríguez García "Cagancho", who was a flamenco singer of some note. There are various explanations as to the nickname's derivation. According to one popular story, Manuel Rodríguez García was called "Cagancho" because he was a good singer, and "Cagancho" is a Caló word that means a kind of songbird. Another story refers to a long past family business of making and selling clothes hangers, with ca gancho (contracted form of cada gancho, meaning "each hanger") always being part of the salesman's street cry. Other interpretations of "Cagancho" have been scatological, with one critic, believing Rodríguez's nickname to be thus derived, refusing to use it in his work because, as he said, such an outlandish bullfighter's way of defecating did not interest him. (Note: "Cagancho" sounds very much like the Spanish words "caga ancho", which mean "he shits wide" or "proud". It seems unlikely, though, that anybody would actually choose a nickname that meant this.) Other writers, though, were somewhat less respectful, even going as far as to write and publish rhymes that referred to the nickname in this way, like this one, for example:

Spanish	English translation
Porque, vamos, francamente, ese apodo impertinente es una ofensa al olfato, por lo nuevo y maloliente, no le cuadra dignamente a un artista de boato.	Because, come on, frankly, that impertinent nickname is an offence to the sense of smell, because of its newness and smelliness, it does not worthily fit an artist of pageantry.

Rodríguez was also sometimes called "el gitano de los ojos verdes" ("the green-eyed Gypsy"), which drew a parallel with Villalón bulls' eyes.

== Career as a novillero ==
Rodríguez made his public début in San Fernando, Cádiz in 1923 at a contractual bullfighting event. The bull calves were laid on by the Bohórquez ranch.

According to José María de Cossío y Martínez Fortún, a member of Spain's Real Academia de la Historia who wrote much about tauromachy, "He was very good at bullfighting and very bad at killing." This he said in reference to a bullfighting event at which Rodríguez had seen his calf sent back to the bullpen (a very poor outcome).

Rodríguez presented himself at the Maestranza in his hometown, Seville, on 25 July 1924, in an evening novillada (novice bullfight at which calves are used) that involved six bullfighters. The others were Manuel Hiruelo, Enrique Arévalo Montes, Eduardo Pérez "El Niño de la Venta", José Reyes "Pedrillo" and Antonio Rodríguez Pérez "Rodrigo"; all but the first were, like Rodríguez, beginners. Calves for that evening were supplied by the Marqués de Salas ranch. There is disagreement over whether Rodríguez was the one who won the prize of 200 pesetas that was being offered for whoever performed best, with at least one source saying that he did not win, but was nevertheless contracted to come back the next week after the good impression that he had made.

Rodríguez also had a great triumph in Valencia in 1925, and was already becoming a leading novillero (novice bullfighter). The next year, on 27 June in Barcelona, he had a dreadful performance. This, however, was juxtaposed with another bullfight in Barcelona on 4 July that was very important for him, even though he fought others at that bullring the same year, on 25 July and 1 August. The contrast prompted one writer to wonder "Which is the legitimate Cagancho, the one of the third bull, fearful, cowering, clumsy, or the one of the sixth, upright, a great bullfighter and brave? He himself will clear up our doubts." It was nonetheless a key season in his career, and did much to make him a bullfighting star. Cossío wrote that these three bullfights at Barcelona opened the doors to Madrid, where he presented himself on 5 August, and that the event established him. His style of bullfighting led to ovations usually reserved for bullfighting's greats. At that novillada at Las Ventas that afternoon, Rodríguez alternated with Gitanillo de Triana and Enrique Torres. The bulls were supplied by the Villamarta ranch. In those days, his apoderado (manager-agent) was Domingo Dominguín, who helped arrange his date in Madrid, which cemented his place among that city's aficionados. He came back to Las Ventas on 10 September 1926 for another bullfight, but was badly wounded.

In October 1926, the bullfighting magazine La Lidia advertised a charitable festival, organized by Paco Gómez Yunta in Tarancón, in which Rodríguez had himself billed as Joaquín Rodríguez "Cagancho".

== Bullfighting career ==
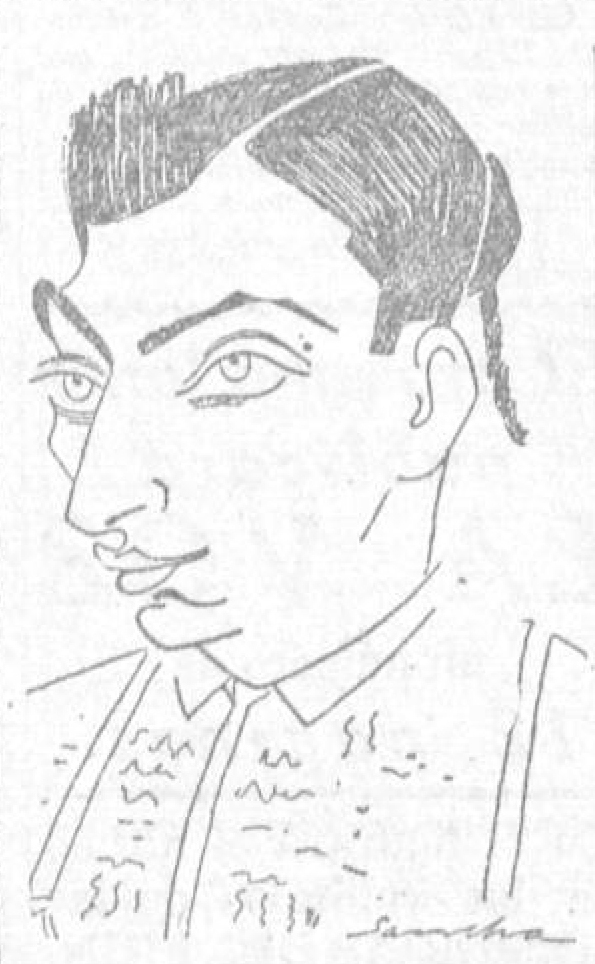
Caricature of Rodríguez drawn about four months after his alternativa

Rodríguez took his alternativa on 17 April 1927 at Murcia. Standing as "godfather" for the ceremony was the Madrid bullfighter Rafael Gómez Ortega "El Gallo", while Manuel Jiménez Moreno "Chicuelo" bore witness. Bulls were supplied that afternoon by the Doña Carmen de Federico ranch, and the bull used for the ceremony was named Orejillo ("Little Ear"). It was the first bullfight in which he had performed that season.

Not all reviewers were kind in their responses to Rodríguez's alternativa performance. Don Diquela, writing for the Liberal de Murcia said of it "Cagancho's performance was something so deplorable that there is no adjective in our rich Castilian language that can describe it."

César Jalón, in his book Memorias de Clarito, waxed rather metaphoric in his account of Rodríguez's afternoon in Murcia in which he describes the bullfighters' "flight":

It is already time and the train does not start. What is happening? The stationmaster is waiting for the bullfighters. But the bullfighters are not allowed to cross the Alameda. The public insults them and crosses and surrounds their cars. The stationmaster hesitates. And when he seems determined to give the signal to leave, they invade the platform, matadors, subalternos and piqueros, escorted by the triumphant sword boys. And everyone assaults the doors and stuffs the luggage through the windows. The liberating whistle sounds. The train is on its way.

Things got even worse for Rodríguez on 1 May in Caravaca de la Cruz. His failure there was so extraordinary that he, as it were, sank into the mire. Cagancho riddled his victims, who had been supplied by the Duque de Braganza ranch, giving rise to an unprecedented scandal, and also leading the corrida presidency to issue three warnings (the maximum before the bull is sent back to the bullpen — in itself a disgrace for the bullfighter) for each bull that he faced. The bulls, though, never made it back to the bullpen, dying of the many wounds inflicted on each one. Murcia's newspaper El Tiempo had this to say about the event: "The Caravaca bullfight was a real disaster and the bullfighting figure of the bullfighter Cagancho was buried forever." (Note: The apparent stylistic awkwardness here ("bullfighting figure of the bullfighter") is not present in the original Spanish ("figura torera del diestro"), and arises from limitations in English bullfighting vocabulary.)

Clarito, another famous Spanish Romani bullfighter recounts in his memoirs a story in which he confirms Rodríguez's reputation as one unskilled in slaying bulls. Rodríguez came to Clarito's hotel one day, heartbroken, to tell him that their friend Sabino had suddenly died. Clarito then hurriedly finished his cup of coffee. No sooner had he done so than Sabino suddenly appeared, very much alive. This drew an outburst from Clarito in which he said to Rodríguez "Well, damn your lineage! Do you leave your friends alive, too?"

El Tiempo may have been quite harsh in what it wrote about Rodríguez, but his bullfight in Toledo on 8 May 1927 was the one that prompted Gregorio Corrochano to liken him to Montañés (see below).

Eight days later, on 16 May – the Feast of Corpus Christi that year – Cagancho achieved a resounding triumph in the same Toledo bullring with the bull Rondeño from the Marqués de Guadalest ranch, which was pulled round the bullfighting ground before being dragged out. On the bill that afternoon were Antonio Cañero (a rejoneador), Gallo, Rayito and Rodríguez. The bullfight-goers filled the ring with hats. Ears were cut, along with a tail and there was "delirium".

Rodríguez's alternativa was confirmed, despite various débâcles earlier in this season, on 21 June (or 22 June — sources differ) that same year at Las Ventas in Madrid. Standing as "godfather" this time was the Madrid bullfighter Victoriano Roger Serrano "Valencia II", while Marcial Lalanda bore witness. Bulls were supplied that afternoon by the Doña María Montalvo ranch, and the bull used for the ceremony was named Naranjo ("Orange Tree"). He appeared at 46 corridas in the 1927 Spanish bullfighting season, and knew both triumphs and humiliating defeats: ten of the bulls that he faced were sent back to the bullpen after he had failed to slay them. He thus became a bullfighter to whom nobody was indifferent; for better or for worse, he aroused passions. This, Rodríguez's first bullfighting season as a fully-fledged matador, swung between resounding successes and stunning failures, a pattern that was to be repeated throughout his career. One of his greatest failures came on 25 August 1927 in Almagro; this was the one that gave the Spanish language a now common expression referring to a lamentable failure (see "Quedar como Cagancho en Almagro" below). He also appeared at 10 corridas in Mexico that year.

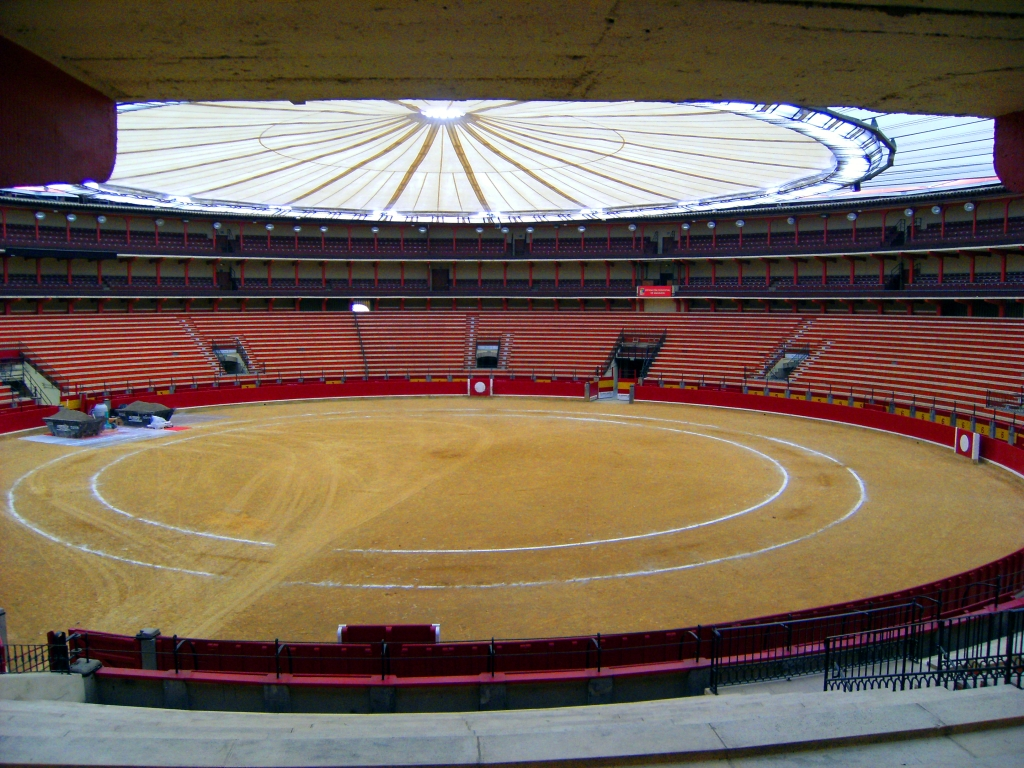
The Zaragoza bullring, where Rodríguez left the bullfight and apparently reported to the infirmary with an imaginary injury, 17 October 1927.

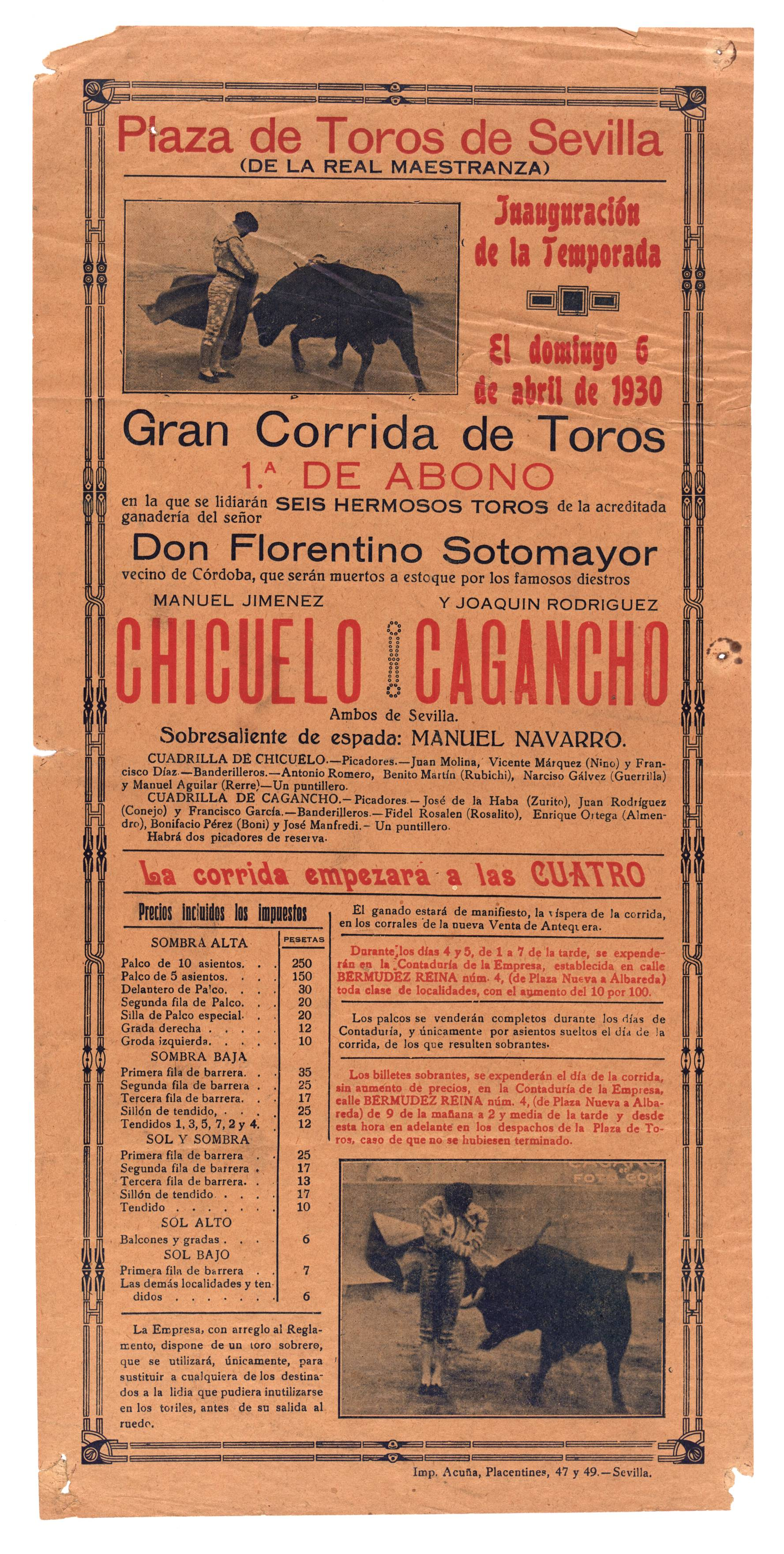
Advertisement for Seville's 1930 season opener at La Maestranza, at which Rodríguez shared billing with Chicuelo; the lower image shows Rodríguez.

Come 17 October 1927, Rodríguez found himself in Zaragoza for yet another bullfight that ended miserably. He was sharing billing with Antonio Márquez and Gitanillo de Triana, (Note: It is unclear from the source whether this refers to Rafael Vega or Francisco Vega.) with bulls supplied by the Concha y Sierra ranch. With the afternoon's fifth bull, he heard the regulatory warnings and the cowbells ringing and went to the infirmary. The president suspended the fight once Doctor Pérez Serrano had certified that he was not injured. He later left the bullring infirmary in civilian clothes in a car, bound for Casetas, where he caught a train out of town.

An important foundation to Rodríguez's career was his sojourn in Mexico in 1928, where he established himself professionally and became an idol to Mexican fans. At his presentation in the El Toreo bullring on 2 December, he reaped one tail, which began what would be an excellent season in the Mexican bullrings. However, upon his return to his homeland, his lacklustre performances led to his appearing at only 31 corridas in the 1929 bullfighting season. A case in point was Rodríguez's appearance at the Seville Fair that year. He was to have fought on three of the five bullfighting afternoons, but his first afternoon went quite badly, and his second was so bad and caused such a scandal that he had to be taken away from the bullring under police protection. Fearing that there might be even worse violence if Rodríguez showed up for the third afternoon, the Civil Governor forbade him to do so. On the other hand, he once again went back to Mexico that winter and seemingly got back into the spirit of his profession, thus leading to his best year ever in Spain in the 1930 bullfighting season, which saw him perform at 68 bullfights. He managed not to have quite as many failures in the bullring as before, and he turned out to be most masterful at the estocada (the sword thrust meant to kill the bull). This triumphant return to Spain's bullrings was, however, cut short by a goring that he sustained in May 1931 when a bull from the Alipio Pérez Tabernero ranch thrust his horn into Rodríguez's left thigh, (Note: Some sources say that the bull gored both Rodríguez's thighs.) not only wounding him badly, but also dampening his spirits. He only made it back to the bullring on 2 August the next year when he appeared at Cádiz. The next several years, though, found him in a professional slump, and he sought shelter from his woes again in Mexico. Rodríguez was an idol in Mexico and, like all of his generation, whether bullfighters or not, suffered through the Spanish Civil War. Indeed, it was in the Civil War that Rodríguez suffered the woe of losing his father, Joaquín Rodríguez Vargas, ironically during an attempt to spare his life by having him and other kin flee from Seville to Marseille in France. The elder Mr. Rodríguez, who was already quite old, made it onto a ship that took him as far as Valencia, but on the voyage, he fell ill, and died upon arrival, never having reached Marseille. He was buried in Valencia.

After the war, though, Rodríguez's career never recovered the glory that it had once known. He returned to Spain in 1947 and took part in corridas until 1953. He seldom got as many as ten bullfighting engagements in each of these years, but nonetheless sporadically demonstrated his genius, even then ending this six-year span with some faenas (series of passes before the bullfighter slays the bull) that were "magic and matchless". Cossío, in his work Los Toros, says of him: "Cagancho was an exceptional bullfighter, not only for the bullfighting value of his art, but for the plastic grace, authentically Gypsy, with which he practised it. Seeing him before a bull was a real delight for the spectator."

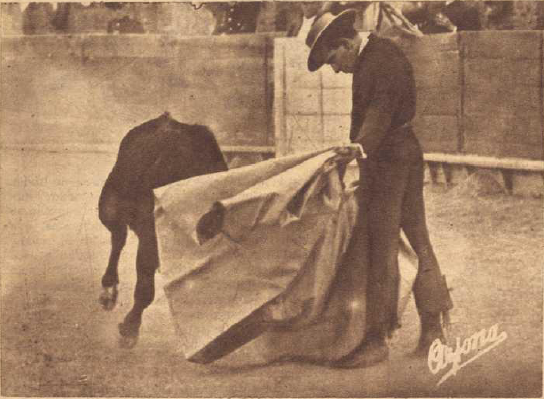
Rodríguez performing a verónica

Rodríguez formed together with Rafael Vega Gitanillo de Triana (Francisco's brother) and Rafael Albacín a bill of matchless Gypsy artists. In 1950, he gave the alternativa to both Julio Aparicio Martínez and Miguel Báez Spínola "El Litri" in Valencia.

Rodríguez's retirement from the Spanish bullrings came in 1953. His last bullfight in Madrid was on 14 June that year with Pepe Bienvenida and Antonio Caro, who followed the rejoneador Ángel Peralta Pineda. He saved his last bullfighting performance, however, for Mexico, where he fought at the Monumental in 1955 alongside Pedrés and Rafael Rodríguez (no kin). In 1964, he performed at the Plaza de El Toreo in a tributary festival to Mexican bullfighter Rodolfo Gaona. This would be his last public appearance.

The critic Gregorio Corrochano once said of Rodríguez "Cagancho's bullfighting is a carving by Montañés". Indeed, Rodríguez belonged to a class of bullfighters who could offer both the best and the worst in the same afternoon. He was one of Juan Belmonte's contemporaries and was considered one of the greatest exponents of verónica bullfighting (a reference to a move with the muleta in which the matador draws it over the bull's face as he passes).

=== Activity in Mexico ===
At his Mexican presentation on 2 December 1928, mentioned above, Rodríguez slew the day's fourth bull, Merenguillo, from the La Laguna ranch to enthusiastic shouts of "¡Torero, torero!". On 24 November 1929, he fought Corbetero from the same ranch, performing a masterful faena. He was deemed "superb" at his appearance on 5 January 1930 with the afternoon's fourth bull, Tirano ("Tyrant"), likewise from the La Laguna ranch, and it was reckoned one of the best faenas ever performed in Mexico, and the crowd's response was very enthusiastic.

Rodríguez appeared at the Mexico City bullring on 27 December 1931 in a bullfight for the Press Association's benefit. Also on the bill that afternoon were Vicente Barrera, Fermín Espinosa "Armillita Chico" and Alberto Balderas. The eight bulls were laid on by the Zotoluca ranch. There was also the incentive of being awarded the "Medal of Art" and the "Medal of Valour" to the bullfighter who best displayed these traits. Rodríguez won the former after driving the crowd wild in a way quite unlike what he had seen at Almagro. Indeed, the bullfight-goers in Mexico City were most impressed, and he had only needed one estocada to slay the beast. He reaped both ears and the tail from this, the afternoon's fifth bull. Vicente Barrera was awarded the latter prize.

On 10 January 1932, the faena that Rodríguez performed with the afternoon's fifth bull, Guerrita ("Little War"), from the San Mateo ranch, the crowd stood up to watch. He slew Guerrita with a half estocada and a flawless volapié (the usual way of delivering the estocada). He walked around the ring several times, once accompanied by rancher Antonio Laguna. On 4 December 1932, he gave the crowd a wonderful faena with the Laguna bull Gitano ("Gypsy") and ended with a great volapié. On 29 December 1935, with the afternoon's fifth bull, Moñudo ("Mexican Eagle" — although the bird is actually a kind of falcon), he performed a masterful faena, and his volapié was deemed magnificent. He walked round the bullfighting ground four times before the frenzied crowd, which took more than ten minutes. On 2 February 1936, he fought Chavalillo ("Little Kid"), a superb specimen from the Torrecilla ranch. It went well, even though he was less lucky with the sword: it was a half estocada, with two stabs and one deep thrust. He was nevertheless awarded the maximum trophies (that is to say, both ears and the tail).

Slowly, Rodríguez's appearances in Mexico grew until the Proclamation of the Republic and, five years later, the Spanish Civil War's outbreak led to him spending more time on the far side of the Atlantic. In Mexico in 1945, he starred along with Carmen Amaya (who was also Spanish) in the film Pasión Gitana ("Gypsy Passion") or Los amores de un torero ("A Bullfighter's Loves"), a melodrama in what was then the Mexican style, whose plot was centred on the relationship between a bullfighter and a Gypsy woman.

Rodríguez gave up active bullfighting in the 1953 bullfighting season and moved to the Mexican capital, although he would still fight bulls on a few afternoons in Spain. He got on very well with Mexico and its people, so much so that when he ran into financial hardship in the wake of leaving bullfighting, the then President of Mexico, Adolfo López Mateos called him to his office and named him personal adviser, with the attendant salary, which was forthwith delivered to his house.

Nevertheless, in 1955, he found himself appearing in a film again, this one American, and not in a starring role this time: The Magnificent Matador, in which he played himself.

== Death ==
Rodríguez died on either 31 December 1983 or 1 January 1984 (sources differ) of lung cancer in Mexico City. His son, Joaquín Rodríguez Sánchez, who was also a bullfighter, was with him when he died.

== Tributes ==
Tarancón has a street named Calle Joaquín Rodríguez Cagancho, after the bullfighter.

Rodríguez's link with this town in the Province of Cuenca began in 1928 when, despite many people who said that he did not get near enough to his bulls, one bull gored him badly, causing various injuries. The one that he sustained to his chest could have killed him had one of the medallions that he always wore not been there to deflect the bull's horn. It was his "Our Lady of Riánsares" medallion that saved him. This had been given him by the town of Tarancón, and it reduced the wounding to his chest, as Rodríguez himself once explained, to a tear in his skin. Thankful for this "miracle", he made a gift of a mantle to the Virgin of Tarancón. In the book about the history of nursing written by Julián Martínez Fronce one can read about how at "Uncle Jabalera's" bullring, prominent figures from the bullfighting world would perform, foremost among them "the great Gypsy bullfighter Joaquín Rodríguez Cagancho, who reached the top of bullfighting's escalafón (bullfighters' rankings)" (actually, he never did). The book explains that he was a great philanthropist for Tarancón, and that "from his pocket came the money with which the first X-rays were installed at Saint Emily's Hospital". Furthermore, he performed several times at bullfighting festivals to raise funds for the town's poor and for the hospital.

Almagro in the Province of Ciudad Real unveiled a plaque in Rodríguez's honour on 6 October 2023 in recognition of his prominent career in tauromachy. The ceremony took place at the very bullring where, in 1927, Rodríguez gave his most infamous performance (see "Quedar como Cagancho en Almagro" below).

Found on Seville's Calle Evangelista, where Rodríguez was born, is an azulejo tile in his honour with the inscription: "Into the bosom of a family of flamenco singers, at this end of Evangelista of the Sevillian capital, there came into the world a genius of the art of bullfighting Joaquín Rodríguez "Cagancho" who brought to the bullfighting grounds the magic of the elves of La Cava. He was born in 1903 and died the last day of 1983." (Note: The original Spanish text reads: En el seno de una familia de cantaores, vino al mundo en este extremo de Evangelista, un genio del arte de torear Joaquín Rodríguez "Cagancho" quien llevó a los ruedos la magia de los duendes de La Cava. Nació en 1903 y falleció el último día de 1983. The source leaves out the words "en México" that can be seen in the image of the azulejo linked below. "La Cava" refers to a riverside street in Seville once known as a "Gypsy neighbourhood". It was "redeveloped" – with the attendant removal of the Romani population – by the Franco régime in the 1950s. The azulejo can be found at a building entrance at 37°22′56.4″N 6°0′13.5″W, and an image of it is linked in External links below.)

Pablo Hermoso de Mendoza, a famous Spanish rejoneador, bought a horse for his own professional use whom he named Cagancho, after Rodríguez. The horse Cagancho turned out to make a very memorable mark in the annals of tauromachy himself. Upon the horse's death of a stroke at the age of 29 in 2015, one obituary called him "the most determinative [horse] of the modern history of rejoneo", and furthermore says that he faced more than a thousand bulls with his owner-rider in the sadle at bullrings in both Spain and Latin America. Cagancho's career ran from 1991 to 2002, when there was a "farewell tour" of sorts, with the by now very famous horse appearing together with Hermoso de Mendoza at several bullrings in Spain, which even included a trip out through the main gate at Pamplona. Hermoso de Mendoza also took his horse over to Mexico one last time and there, after he and his horse had together faced one last bull, symbolically relieved Cagancho of his tack and let him run free on the bullfighting ground.

Upon Rodríguez's death at New Year's 1984, the poet José Carlos Luna wrote this rhyme by way of bidding him farewell:

Spanish	English translation
¡Cagancho de las marismas canta lo que bien te venga... que entre la tierra y el cielo llanos y cimas alguno habrá que te entienda!	Cagancho from the marshes sing whatever suits you... for between earth and heaven, plains and peaks there will be someone who understands you!

== Style ==
Aside from the fierce criticism that Rodríguez sometimes received, there were some commentators who had kinder things to say about his style of bullfighting.

Writer Néstor Luján once said of Rodríguez:

The important thing in him is the movement, the luxurious gesture, the superb ease with which he creates the most unexpected adornments, his way of walking, his almost liturgical passes, the uncanny and inexplicable fascination of his personality. ... Perhaps Cagancho has come to understand the enigma of bullfighting plasticity, just as it is known that his grandfather came to master the fundamental force of the voice. ... Possibly Cagancho, in an unconscious way, has been in his art a sumptuous translation of all that bullfighting has by way of intelligence and fantasy, of attempting to fascinate gold with magical and ritual acts. He knew nothing about his bullfighting because everything came from within, both fear and elegance.

Don Ventura Bagüés thought that Rodríguez's style was "modern":

If with Plutarch's faculties we were to write new Parallel Lives, we would put Cagancho next to Rafael el Gallo, saving of course, the distance that exists between the old standards of execution of Rafael Gómez and the very modern ones of Joaquín Rodríguez.

On the other hand, Ernest Hemingway mentioned Rodríguez in his non-fiction book Death in the Afternoon, and most of what he said was not complimentary:

Cagancho is a gypsy, subject to fits of cowardice, altogether without integrity, who violates all the rules, written and unwritten, for the conduct of a matador but who, when he receives a bull that he has confidence in, and he has confidence in them very rarely, can do things which all bullfighters do in a way they have never been done before and sometimes standing absolutely straight with his feet still, planted as though he were a tree, with the arrogance and grace that gypsies have and of which all other arrogance and grace seems an imitation, moves the cape spread full as the pulling jib of a yacht before the bull's muzzle so slowly that the art of bullfighting, which is only kept from being one of the major arts because it is impermanent, in the arrogant slowness of his veronicas becomes, for the seeming minutes that they endure, permanent.

Hemingway further held Rodríguez to be utterly without honour. Nevertheless, even Hemingway had to say that of the three Romani bullfighters that he had witnessed at the bullring – the others were Andrés Mérida and Rodríguez's cousin Gitanillo de Triana – Rodríguez was the most talented. Mérida, however, was the one that Hemingway liked best.

== Quedar como Cagancho en Almagro ==
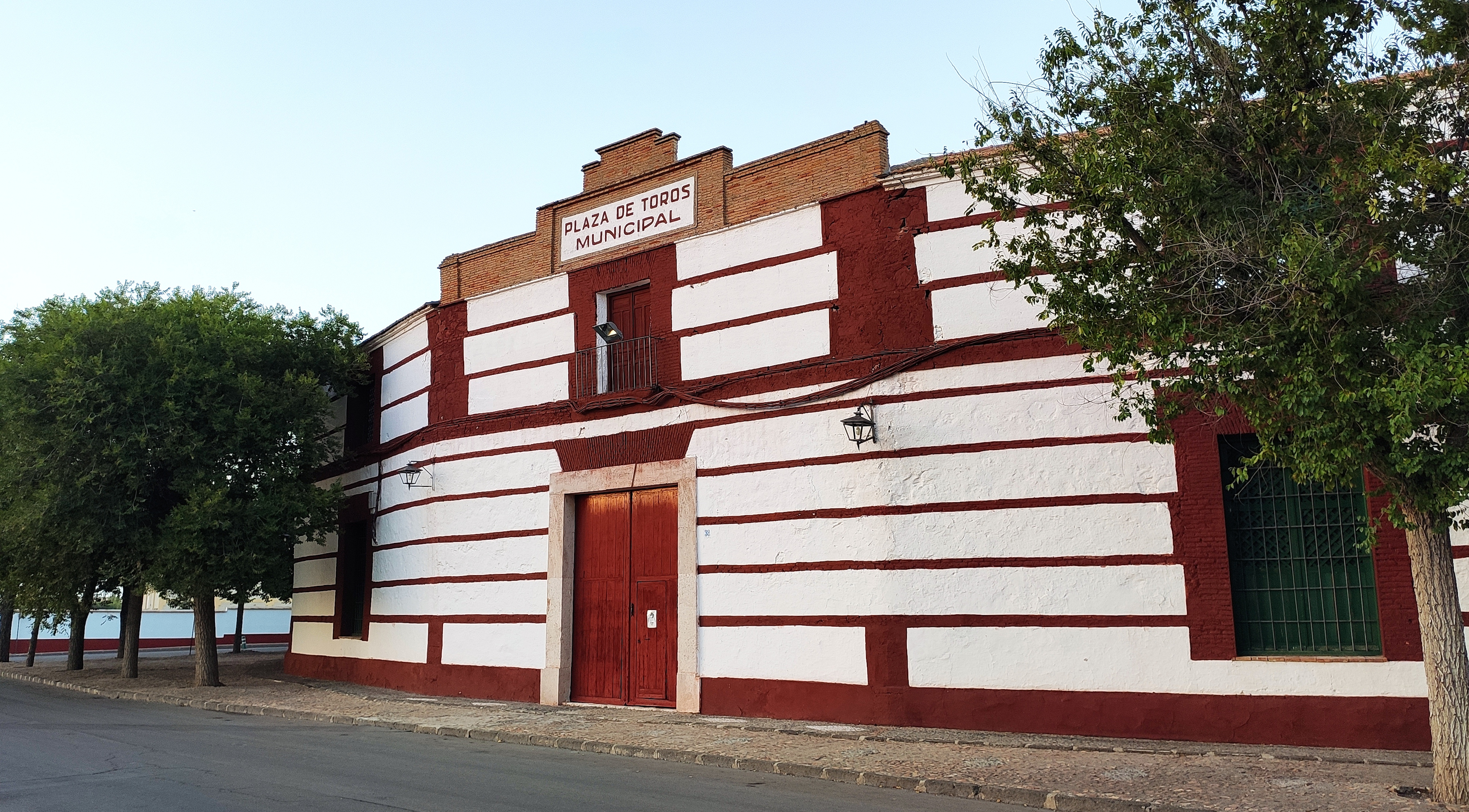
The Plaza de toros municipal in Almagro, the scene of Rodríguez's great ignominy on 25 August 1927, now memorialized in a well-known Spanish expression.

The expression "quedar como Cagancho en Almagro" (literally "to end up like Cagancho in Almagro") is used in Spain to mean something like "to make a thorough, utter, embarrassing mess of things in public". It arises from a corrida that was held on a very hot day, 25 August 1927, at the Almagro bullring in which Rodríguez shared billing with Antonio Márquez and Manuel del Pozo "Rayito". The bulls were laid on by the Pérez Tabernero ranch. Unfortunately, his performance was a catastrophe. With his first bull, he showed lack of interest and cowardice, repeatedly failing to slay the animal, despite several unmasterful stabs at the beast's neck and shoulders. On the first pass, the bull snatched Rodríguez's cape away and the bullfighter was behind one of the barriers in two leaps. The crowd was by the end of this encounter in a foul mood at what they clearly saw as a rotten performance. All kinds of objects – cushions, wineskins, jugs, and even stones among them – were thrown down onto the bullfighting ground by the irate spectators. Nonetheless, with his second bull, things got even worse as he avoided facing the bull, which was huge and before Rodríguez came out, had already killed several horses (picadores' horses wore no padding in those days and were often killed by the bull). He came out for the tercio de muerte bearing the biggest muleta that anybody had ever seen, and only showed the bull its outermost point as he passed (Hemingway observed this same behaviour from Rodríguez at other bullfights).

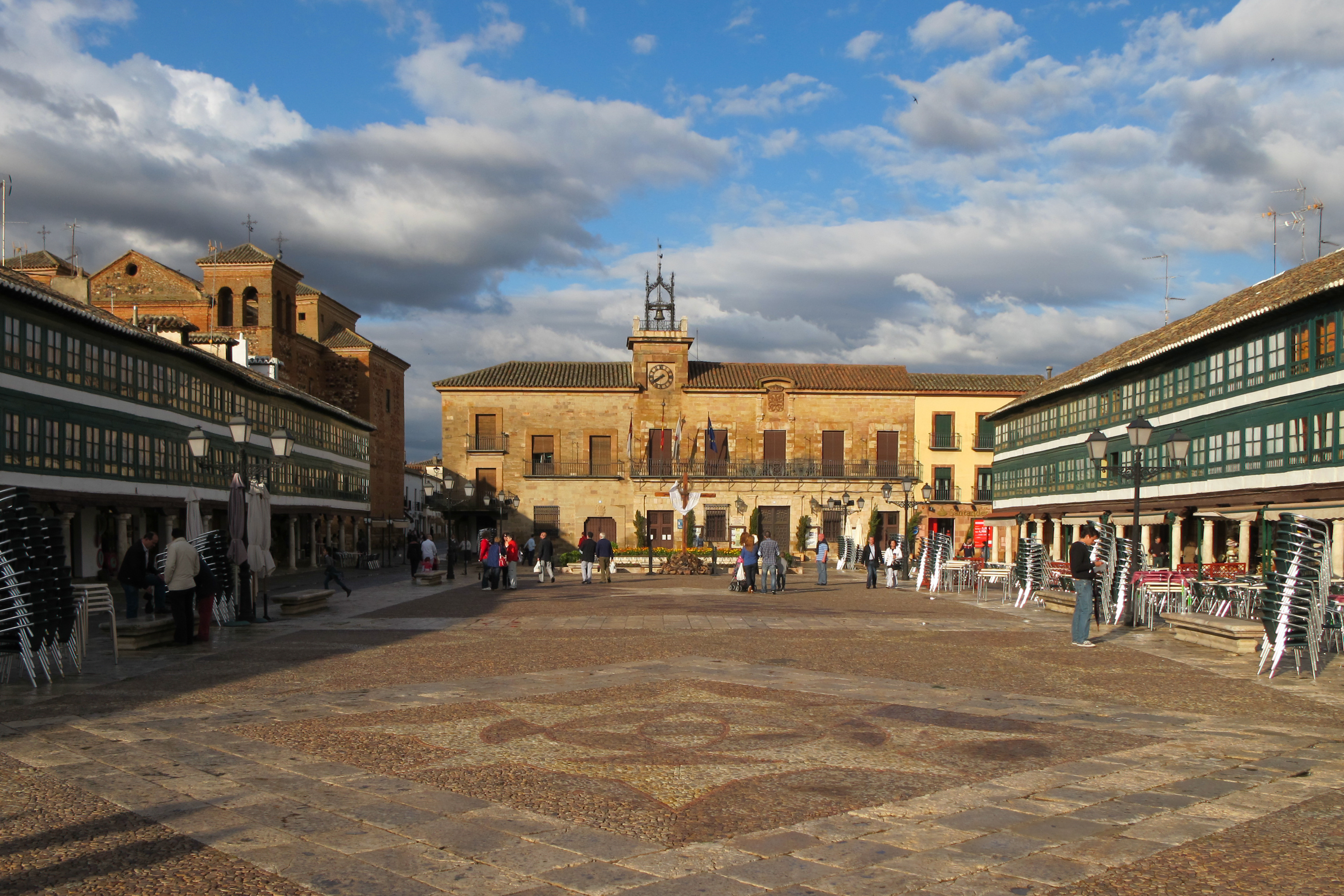
Almagro's town hall (centre), where the Guardia Civil took the bullfighting team to avoid a most unpleasant outcome.

He also took several stabs at the bull's belly on these passes, which unsurprisingly resulted in an enraged bull. Rodríguez ran and ducked behind one of the barriers, and when the bull came near enough, the bullfighter stabbed him from behind the barrier. His subalternos decided to come out to help – with swords – and began their own stabbing. Meanwhile, Rodríguez kept on thrusting with his sword between the barrier's wooden planks and then kept trying to slay his opponent even after being told that the bull was to be sent back to the bullpens. This disastrous performance drew great indignation from the bullfight-goers, who of course greatly outnumbered the Guardia Civil who were there, and they flooded down onto the bullfighting ground to register their displeasure with the bullfighter and his team in person (a still living and very angry bull within the ground's confines notwithstanding). He and his subalternos had to deal with quite a number of slaps from irate aficionados over this dreadful show that they had put on. The Guardia Civil took the bullfighting team to the town hall, for they were rightly in fear for their lives, and arrested Rodríguez and took him off to jail for causing a public scandal. Furthermore, a detachment of Army cavalry had to be brought in to control the situation. Only with great effort did they clear the bullring. The bull apparently died of his wounds, which led one of Rodríguez's subalternos to ask a Guardia Civil officer "Does it seem logical to you that they want to put this fellow [Rodríguez] in jail for not having killed a bull, and that they want to do the same to us for killing him?"

Rodríguez made it to his bullfighting engagement in Almería the next day, but had to pay a fine of 500 pesetas for his own misdeed and a further 250 for his team's wrongdoing.

== Quedar como Cagancho en Las Ventas ==
This antonymous expression, meaning "to do quite well", also seems to enjoy some currency. However, one source gives its meaning, at least in the Mexican bullfighting world, as something very similar to the one that refers to Almagro, saying that it refers to one of Rodríguez's bullfights at Las Ventas in 1927 (the same year as the Almagro fiasco) in which he failed to slay the afternoon's third bull.

== Cabaret incident ==
On 7 August 1933, the old Havas news service (a forerunner to Agence France-Presse) reported an unseemly incident that took place in a cabaret in Cádiz involving Rodríguez. The story was published in, among other outlets, a Paris newspaper called Le Journal the next day under the headline "A bullfighter's odious joke":

While he was at a cabaret, with friends, the bullfighter Cagancho suddenly grabbed a woman who was there and soaked her body with eau de vie; during this time, one of Cagancho's companions brought a match near her. The unfortunate woman was grievously burnt. Cagancho and eleven persons who were accompanying him were arrested. The bullfighter, while undergoing questioning by the judge, displayed great cynicism, boasting that he had a fortune of a million pesetas. (Note: The original French text reads: L'odieuse plaisanterie d'un toréador CADIX, 7 août. — Alors qu'il se trouvait dans un cabaret, avec les amis, le toréador Cagancho a saisi soudainement une femme qui se trouvait là et lui a arrosé le corps d'eau de vie ; pendant ce temps, un compagnon de Cagancho approchait une allumette. La malheureuse a été grièvement brûlée. Cagancho et onze personnes qui l'accompagnaient ont été arrêtés. Le toréador, au cours de son interrogatoire par le juge, a fait preuve d'un grand cynisme, se vantant d'avoir une fortune d'un million de pesetas.)

An anonymous artist for the weekly publication L'Illustré du Petit Journal et son supplément agricole deemed the incident worthy of expression in visual art.
