= Christian Gaillard =

French painter

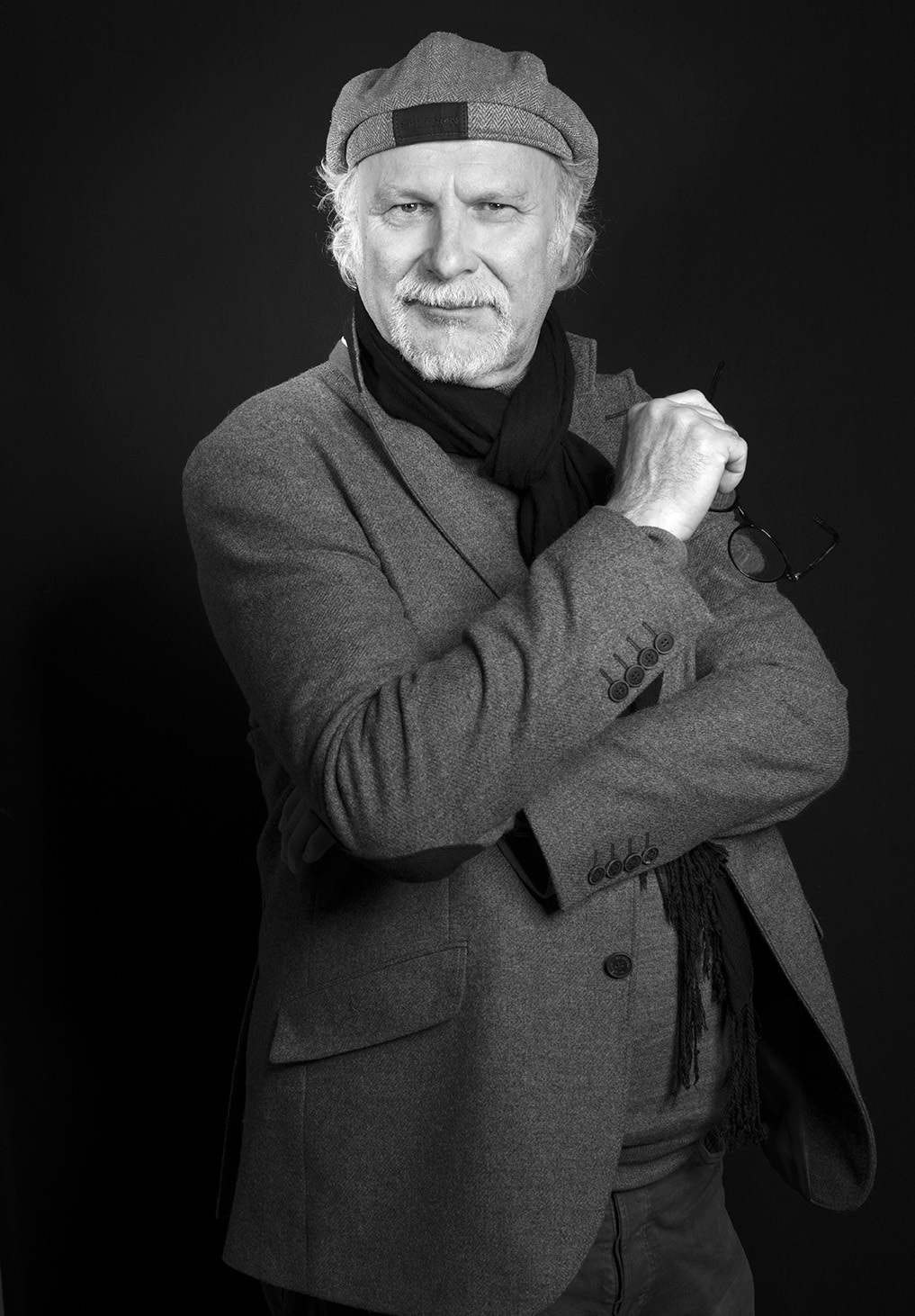
- Born: March 20, 1951; Avignon
- Died: August 9, 2018 (aged 67); Paris
- Resting place: Arles
- Education: École nationale supérieure des arts décoratifs
- Known for: Painting, illustration, photography
- Style: Figurative art
- Awards: First Prize of Real Maestranza de Caballería, Sevilla, Spain; 1991

Christian Gaillard (20 March 1951 – 9 August 2018) was a French painter born in Avignon, France and who lived in Paris and Arles, France.

His figurative style was inspired by Spanish painters including Diego Velázquez, Zurbarán, Goya, Zuloaga and the Mexican Baroque.

He was the first painter born outside of Spain to be awarded First Prize by the Real Maestranza de Caballería de Sevilla. The winning painting is now part of the Maestranza's collection.

When asked about his classical style, Gaillard stated: "Whether or not an approach can be labeled modern is not very important; what matters is that it be unique." His technique as a painter was grounded in video and photography; media in which he also worked.

== Biography ==
As a child, Gaillard moved around a lot because of his father Robert's career in banking. His mother, Renée Tissot, came from a family with a pronounced taste for, and knowledge of, embroidery and couture. He had two brothers, Pierre and Jean. He had one son, Solal, with Marion Desjardins.

Christian Gaillard was married to Ana Cristina Sánchez from 1980 to 1986. He married Susana Elkin in 2006.

=== Education ===
Gaillard received his degree from the École nationale supérieure des arts décoratifs (ENSad) on the rue d'Ulm in Paris.

After trying his hand at animation, he was admitted to the newly-formed department of animation arts at the École des Gobelins, but declined the offer in order to focus on illustration.

After completing his studies at the École nationale supérieure des arts décoratifs, he enjoyed a successful career as an illustrator, leading him to design several covers for magazines such as Le Point, Télérama, Le Figaro magazine, and Le Monde de la musique. He also worked as an illustrator for a number of advertising campaigns for companies such as Lindt chocolates and Grant's whisky. He also illustrated numerous book covers and cinema posters.

=== Career ===
His encounter with the bullfighter Nimeño II, Christian Montcouquiol, introduced him to bullfighting and marked the beginning of his work on this theme, which he developed throughout his life. His paintings were created following friendly encounters with bullfighters including El Cordobés, José Ortega Cano, Juan Bautista, Sébastien Castella, and Juan José Padilla.

His portraits often represent bullfighters from behind, posing in the "relaxed posture of the beast-taming gladiator". "Be it next to, below, alongside, or beyond, Gaillard's paintings create 'more than the real'".”

In 2002, he donated his painting Profile of courage, a tribute to the firefighters who lost their lives in New York City in the September 11 attacks, to the Paris Fire Brigade, which donated it to its sister institution the New York City Fire Department to mark their partnership. Printed reproductions of the painting were sold to raise funds for New York City firefighters.

Christian Gaillard painted more than 300 large-format works. His paintings are part of private collections in France, Spain, Mexico, Israel and Hong Kong, as well as museum collections.

He also created posters for bullfighting festivals including the Feria du Riz in Arles and the Feria d’Istres, among others.

== Honors and awards ==
- Mecanorma Prize for the best illustrator (1982)
- Nominated twice for the Salon de la Marine; awarded prize in 1984
- Named peintre de l'Air et de l'Espace (1989)
- First prize, Real Maestranza de Caballería de Sevilla for the painting Azul gris y oro (Gray, Blue and Gold), Spain, 1991. This painting is now part of the Maestranza's collection in Seville.
- Honorary Citizen of the city of Golegã, Portugal. Recipient of the Cross of Saint Martin, 2010.
- Member, CatalPa Prize Jury (annual prize for exhibition catalogs in Paris), 2012-2016
- Member, "Livre & afición" Jury, Ruedo Newton and Paul Ricard, Paris, 2010-2016

== Exhibitions and museums ==
Gaillard’s work has been shown in several Galleries in Paris: Caplain-Matignon Espace Adamski, Epry-Cayla, Kamel Mennour, Ariel Sibony, and Ariel Jakob.

His work has also been exhibited in several cities in the south of France: Hôtel Imperator et Chapelle des Jésuites in Nîmes. Ex-projection with Philippe Schiepan at the Église des Frères prêcheurs, Terre et Pierre, Hôtel de l’Amphithéâtre, and La Maison Close in Arles. Galérie Dom-Art in Dax; Sophie Jullien gallery in Béziers; Galerie Éloge de l’ombre in Uzès.

Internationally, his work has been shown at the Centre Albert Camus in Madagascar; at the Connoisseur Art-Gallery in Hong Kong and Singapore; at Art Miami, the Ambassador Gallery in New York City, at Jones-Terwilliger Fine Arts in Carmel; at the Green House Gallery in San Antonio; at Art-Catto in Portugal.

In 2006, Gaillard was chosen to illustrate the entry tickets for a bullfighting season in San Isidro, Plaza de toros Las Ventas, Madrid, Spain.

He designed the poster for the Feira Nacional do Cavalo, Golegã, Portugal.

The Real Maestranza de Caballería de Sevilla owns the winning painting Azul gris y oro, oil on canvas, 139 x 97 cm.

The Museum of Taurine Cultures Henriette and Claude Vialat has a number of Gaillard’s in its collection including Marie Sara en traje corto bleu and Nimeño II. Several drawings may also be consulted on demand.

The FDNY owns his painting Profile of Courage, oil on canvas, 130 x 89 cm, New York, USA.

== Publications ==
- Gaillard C., Maestros, Atlantica, Paris, 2002 (ISBN 2-84394-502-X).
- Gaillard C. De Luz, peintures, Limited Edition of 150 copies printed on Modigliani paper, Atlantica, Paris, 2005.
- Gaillard C. & Gaillard S., Os homens, os cavalos, des hommes, des chevaux, men and horses. Orgal Impressores, Porto, Portugal. 2011.
- Gaillard C., Le réel en plus..., Galerie Ariel Jakob, Paris, 2017 (ISBN 978-2490201-00-6).

== Filmography ==
- 2007: Gaillard, portrait of Mehdi in La Passion selon Mehdi, Bernard George, Cinétévé, Arte France, NDR
