= Domingo Dominguín =

Spanish bullfighter (1895–1958)

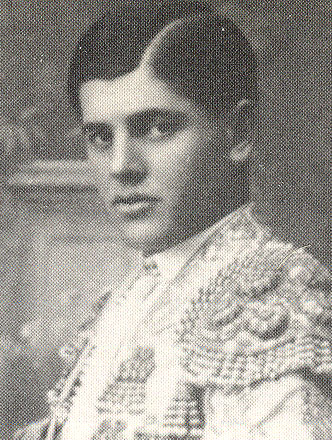
- Dominguín in the 1920s
- Born: Domingo González Mateos; 4 August 1895; Quismondo, New Castile, Spain
- Died: 21 August 1958 (aged 63); Madrid, New Castile, Francoist Spain
- Occupation: Matador
- Spouse: Gracia Lucas Lorente
- Children: 5, including Luis
- Relatives: Miguel Bosé (grandson); Bimba Bosé (great-granddaughter); Dora Postigo (great-great-granddaughter)

Domingo González Mateos (4 August 1895 – 21 August 1958), better known as Domingo Dominguín, was a Spanish bullfighter and progenitor of a dynasty of bullfighters.

== Career ==
He was born in Quismondo in the province of Toledo into a peasant family. He left agriculture to take part in rural bullfights (capeas) until he took his alternativa on 26 September 1917 in Madrid with Joselito (José Gómez Ortega) for sponsor, facing a bull from the Contreras line.

Until 1922 he performed at an honourable level but then suffered a rapid decline and retired from the bullring. He became an apoderado and an outstanding manager of bullfighters, including his youngest son Luis Miguel Dominguín and his future son-in-law Antonio Ordóñez.

== Family ==
Dominguín married Gracia Lucas Lorente, with whom he had five children: Domingo, José, Gracia, Luis Miguel and Carmen. All three sons were well-known bullfighters, as Domingo González Lucas (also known as Dominguín), José González Lucas (also known as Pepe Dominguín) and Luis Miguel Dominguín, the best-known of them, whose son is the singer Miguel Bosé. Dominguín's elder daughter Gracia had a daughter herself who married the bullfighter Ángel Teruel, while his younger daughter Carmen married the bullfighter Antonio Ordóñez; their daughter, the socialite Carmen Ordóñez, married as his first wife the bullfighter Francisco Rivera Pérez, known as Paquirri.
