= Blood in the Bullring =

1969 film

- Directed by: Rafael Gil
- Written by: Andrés Velasco; Pedro Mario Herrero
- Produced by: Andrés Velasco
- Starring: Alberto Closas; Ángel Teruel; Francisco Rabal
- Cinematography: Michel Kelber
- Edited by: José Antonio Rojo
- Music by: Ángel Arteaga
- Production company: Hidalgo Producciones Cinematográficas
- Release date: 19 May 1969
- Running time: 100 minutes
- Country: Spain
- Language: Spanish

Blood in the Bullring (Spanish:Sangre en el ruedo) is a 1969 Spanish drama film directed by Rafael Gil and starring Alberto Closas, Ángel Teruel and Francisco Rabal.

== Synopsis ==
The son of a famous bullfighter tries to solve an injustice that his father did, even if he must become a bullfighter too.

== Cast ==
- Alberto Closas as José Domínguez
- Ángel Teruel as Juanito Carmona 'Manuel Montes'
- Francisco Rabal as Juan Carmona
- Cristina Galbó as Paloma Domínguez
- José Sazatornil as apoderado (manager/agent)
- José Sacristán as Andrés Medina
- Guillermo Marín as newspaper director
- Mary Begoña as Ramona
- Arturo López
- Manuel Velasco
- Joaquín Pamplona as Cayetano
- Alfonso del Real as mayor
- Erasmo Pascual as priest in the seats
- Goyo Lebrero as railway ticket seller
- Rafael Hernández as mechanic
- Fernando Sánchez Polack as Félix
- José Morales
- José Guijarro
- Luis Barbero as Jorge
- María José García de Lorente
- Fabián Conde as Nicasio
- Carlos Hernán
- Maria Gustafsson
- Javier Lozano
- Alberto Fernández as truck driver
- Luís Pacheco
- José Mata
- Ramón Fernández Tejela
- José Bódalo as Rafael

== Bibliography ==
- Bentley, Bernard. A Companion to Spanish Cinema. Boydell & Brewer 2008.
