= Nimeño II =

French matador

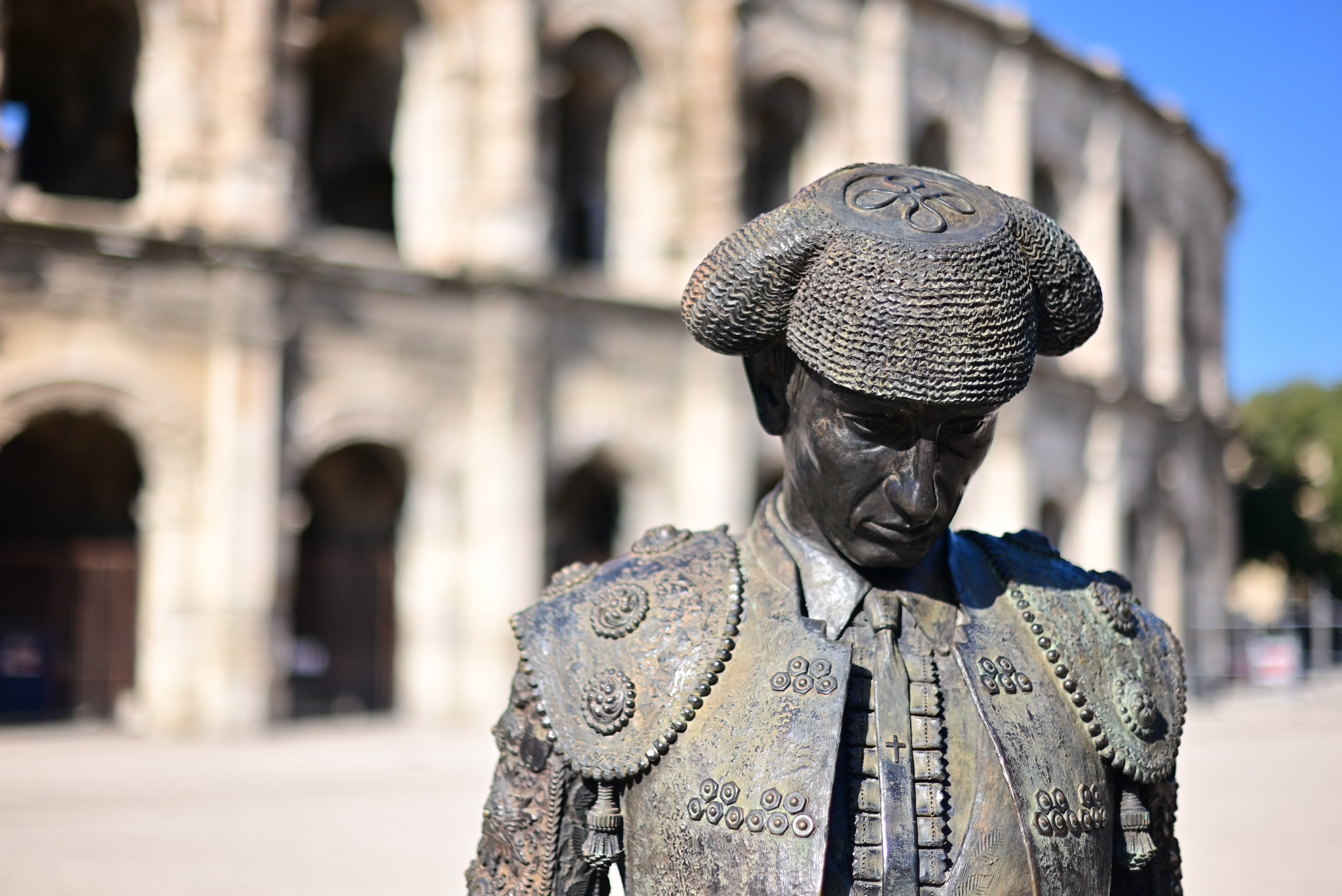
Statue of Nimeño II at the arena of Nîmes.

Christian Montcouquiol ("Nimeño II") (10 March 1954 – 25 November 1991) was a French matador.

== Career ==
Christian Montcouquiol was born in France. He was the brother of Alain Montcouquiol, a bullfighter known as "Nimeño I". Christian fought his first bull at the age of 15. From 1975 to 1982, Christian appeared in arenas in Spain, France, and Latin America under the direction of Spanish promoter Manolo Chopera. In 1982, Christian separated from Chopera and turned to his brother Alain for management.

On 14 May 1989 in Nîmes, Nimeño II and Portuguese torero Victor Mendes were scheduled to fight six bulls. Mendes was injured early in the match, and Nimeño II won renown for killing the six bulls single-handedly.

On 10 September 1989 in Arles, Nimeño II was repeatedly gored and hurled into the air by a bull named Pañolero. He landed on his head, fracturing his cervical vertebrae and suffering tetraplegia (paralysis of both arms and legs). After months of rehabilitation, Nimeño II regained the use of his legs and right arm. He could walk, but his left arm remained paralysed.

== Death ==
Nimeño II died on 25 November 1991 in Caveirac, France, at the age of 37. The cause of death was suicide.

== Honors ==
The bullfighting arenas of Eauze and Caveirac are named for Nimeño II. There are commemorative plaques to Nimeño II in the arenas of Arles, Mont-de-Marsan, and Béziers in France, and Aguascalientes in Mexico. At the arena in Nîmes, a statue of Nimeño II was erected, and the annual "Trophy Nimeño II" is awarded there to the leading novillero without picadors.

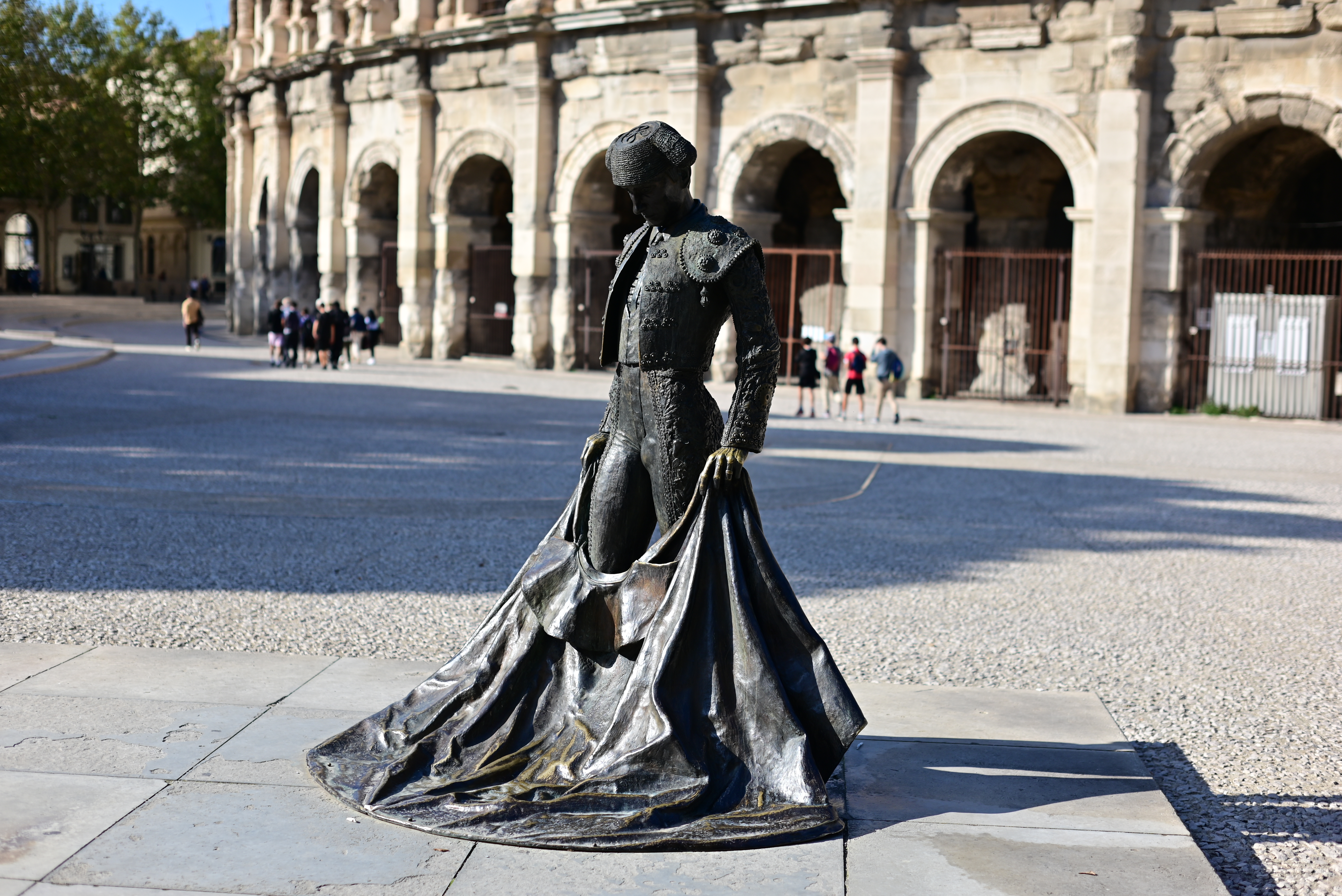
Statue of Nimeño II at the arena of Nîmes.

The street in front of the Béziers arena is named "Plaza Nimeño II".

== Career highlights ==
- Public debut, 30 March 1967, in Tarascon, France
- First novillada (novice bullfight with yearling bulls) without picadors, 19 July 1969, Saint-Gilles (France), yearling bulls from André Pourquier
- First novillada with picadors, 28 May 1972, Lunel (France); the beginning of his public career, after which he never appeared without picadors.
- 17 May 1975 in Nîmes (France), yearling bulls from Matías Bernardos.
- First appearance in Spain, 17 August 1975, in Santiestéban (Jaén); yearling bulls from Germán Gervás.
- Alternativa in Nìmes, 28 May 1977. Godfather, Ángel Teruel; witness, Manzaneres; bulls from Torestrella.
- First appearance as a matador in Spain, 30 May 1977, in Barcelona; bulls from Matías Bernardos.
- Confirmed his alternativa in Mexico, 28 January 1979, godfather, Manolo Martines, witness, Dámaso González; bulls from Tequisquiapan.
- Confirmed his alternativa in Madrid, 21 May 1979, godfather, Rafael de Paula; witness, Ángel Teruel; bulls from Luis Algarra
