= Quismondo =

Coordinates: 40°06′N 4°19′W

- municipality
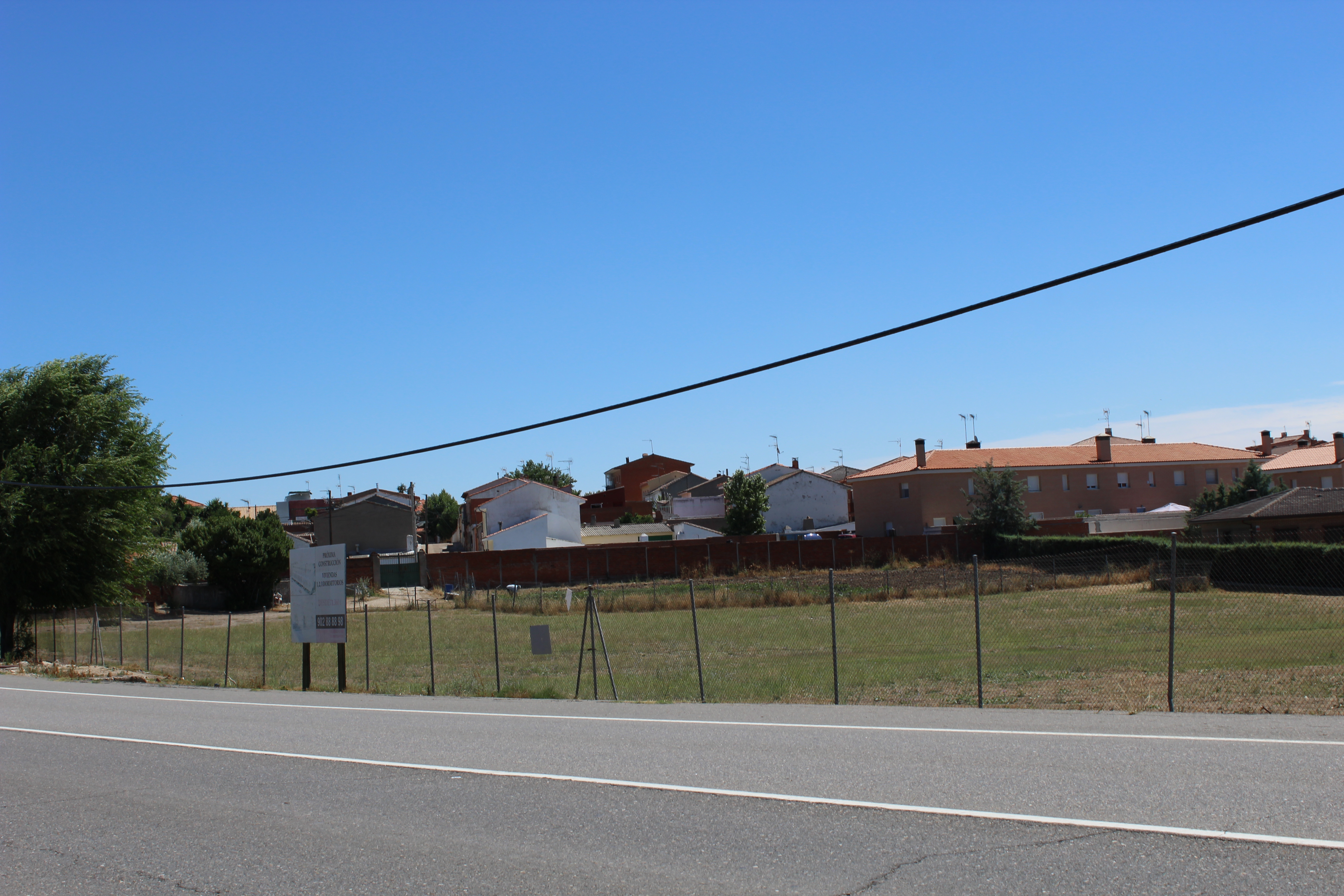
- Quismondo Main Street

- Flag Coat of arms
- Interactive map of Quismondo
- Country: Spain
- Autonomous community: Castile-La Mancha
- Province: Toledo
- Municipality: Quismondo

Area
  - Total: 15.43 km^{2} (5.96 sq mi)
- Elevation: 548 m (1,798 ft)

Population (2025-01-01)
  - Total: 1,857
  - Density: 120.3/km^{2} (311.7/sq mi)
- Time zone: UTC+1 (CET)
  - Summer (DST): UTC+2 (CEST)

Quismondo is a municipality located in the province of Toledo, Castile-La Mancha, Spain. According to the 2006 census (INE), the municipality had a population of 1533 inhabitants.
