= Plaza de toros de Las Palomas =

Plaza de Toros de Las Palomas
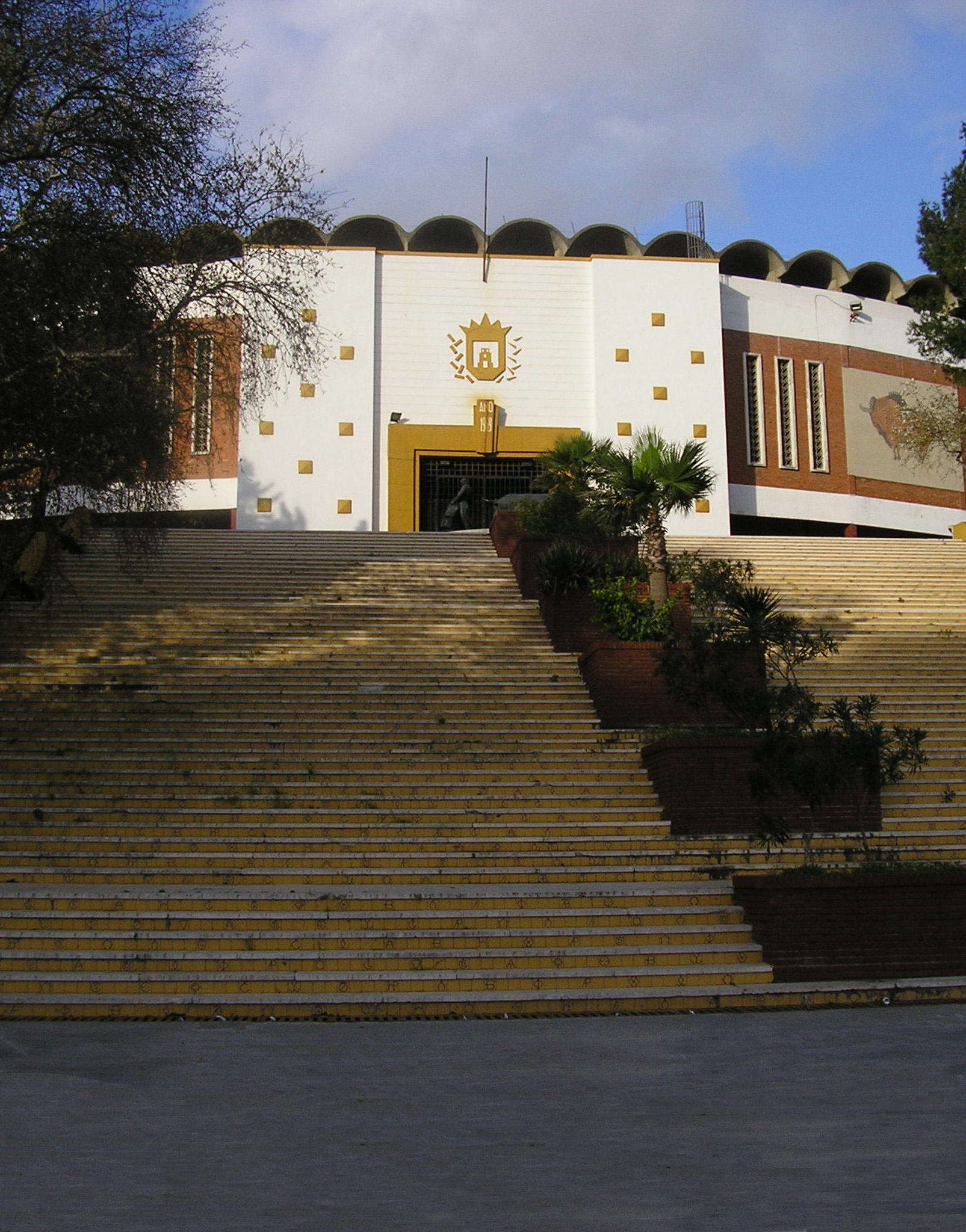
- Plaza las Palomas
- Interactive map of the Plaza de Toros de Las Palomas area

General information
- Type: Bull Ring
- Location: Algeciras, Spain
- Coordinates: 36°08′21.37″N 5°27′34.26″W
- Construction started: 1969
- Opening: 1969; 57 years ago

Plaza de Toros de Las Palomas, officially Monumental Las Palomas, is a bullring in Algeciras at the southern end of Spain. The current building was built in 1969 and it can hold over 11,000 spectators.

== History ==
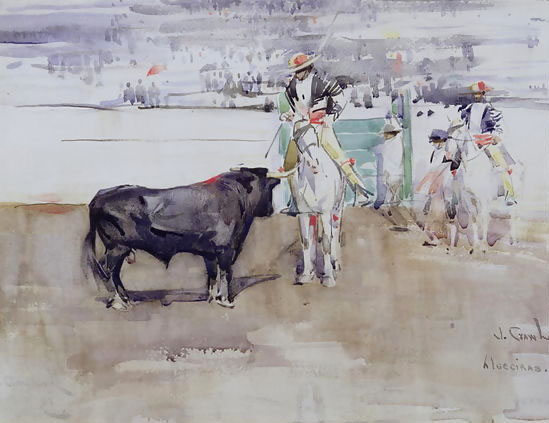
Joseph Crawhall painted here in 1891

Records of bullfights in Algeciras on an informal and irregular nature go back to 1765, but the first formal fight was in 1851 when a ring was built that held 8,000 people. By 1866 this was considered inadequate and a group of people got together to buy the existing bullring and rebuild it. The new ring was ready by 1868 and it served well for a hundred years. However, by 1969 the ring was again too small and because the town now surrounded it could be not be expanded. A new bullring was built in 1969.

The inaugural corrida on 14 June 1969 featured bullfighters Miguelín, Paquirri, and Ángel Teruel.

Since then a grant of over 100,000 Euros has enabled a new classroom to be built for the bullfighting school.
