= Joaquín Bernadó =

Spanish matador (1935–2022)

- Born: Joaquín Bernadó y Bartoméu; 16 August 1935; Santa Coloma de Gramenet, Spain
- Died: 21 February 2022 (aged 86); Madrid, Spain
- Occupation: Matador

Joaquín Bernadó y Bartoméu (16 August 1935 – 21 February 2022) was a Spanish matador.

At the age of 15, Bernadó abandoned his business studies and began bullfighting. He participated in his first novillada on 28 May 1950 in Manresa. He began his first season in Vista Alegre on 25 April 1954, in which he took part in 41 novilladas with limited success. His first alternativa took place on 4 March 1956 in Castellón de la Plana with his godfather Antonio Bienvenida and witness Julio Aparicio Martínez. He took part in 32 bullfights in his first year as an alternativa.

Bernadó died in Madrid on 21 February 2022, at the age of 86.
