= Parque María Cristina =

Coordinates: 36°08′4″N 5°26′55″W

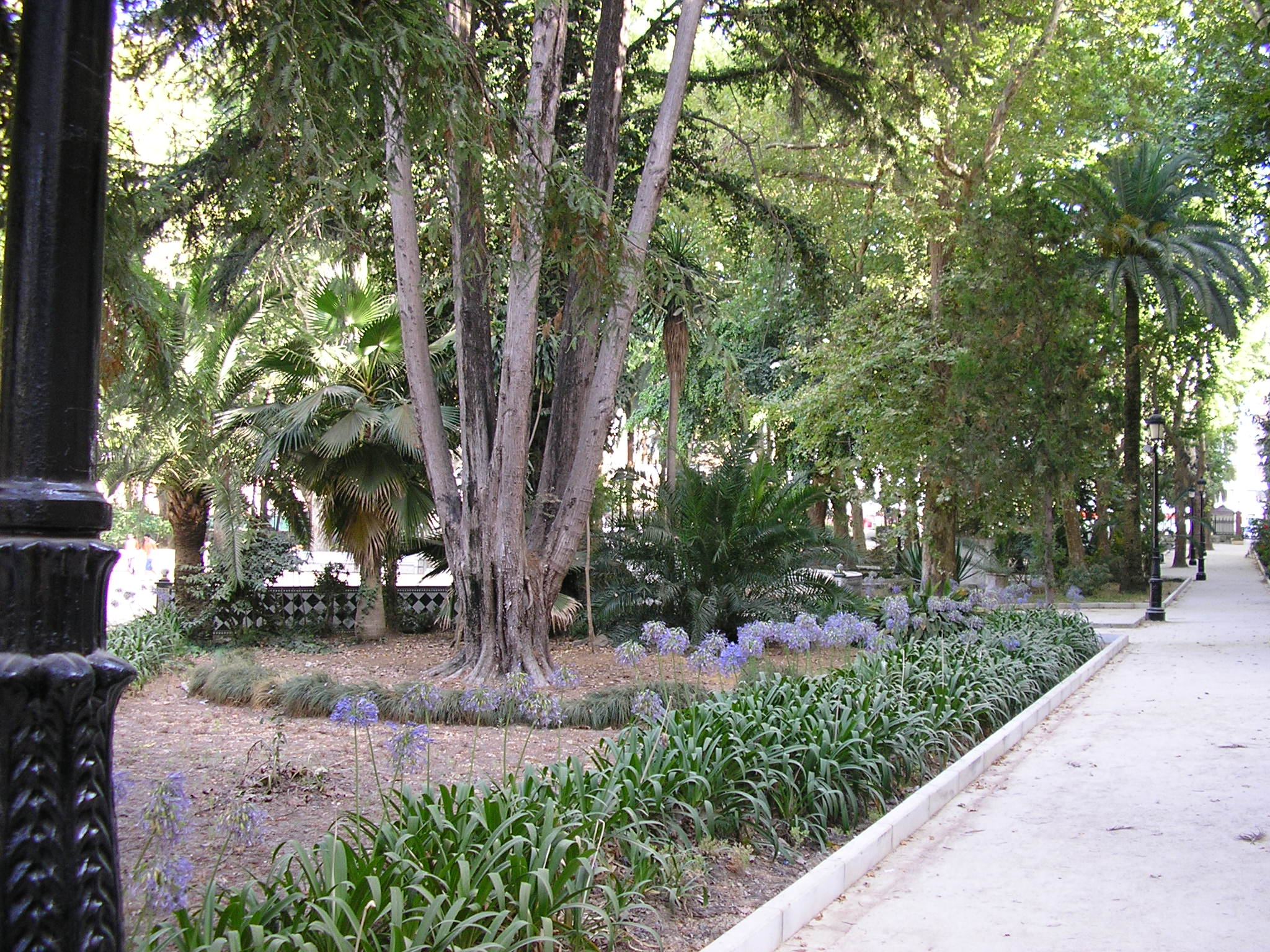
Parque María Cristina

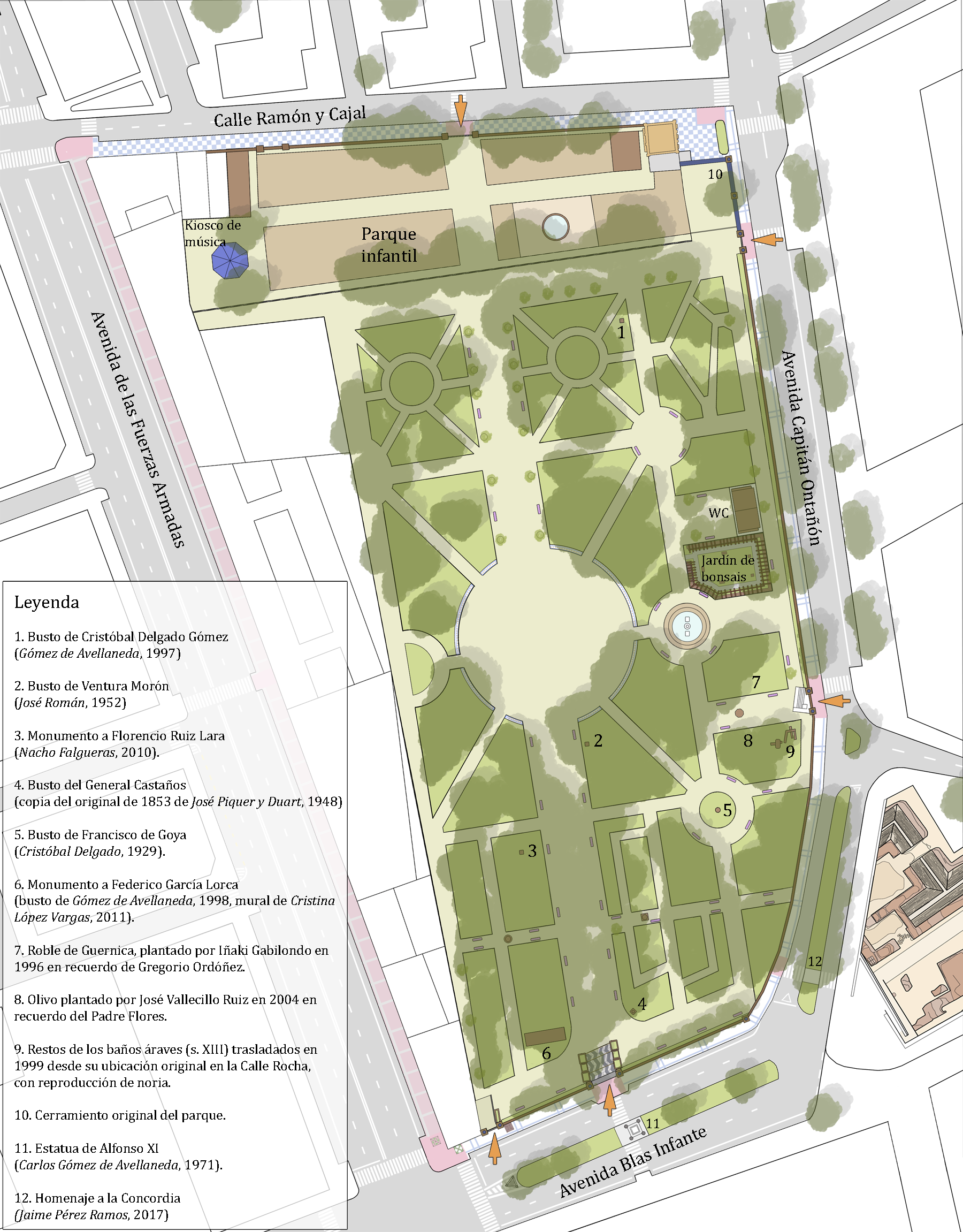
Plan

Parque María Cristina is a park in Algeciras, southeastern Spain. It is bordered by Calle de Ramón y Cajal to the north, Calle Capitán Ontañón to the east, Avenida de Blas Infante to the south, and Avenida de las Fuerzas Armadas to the east. It is one of the oldest parks in the city, established in 1834. It covers an area of 20,683 m².
