= Bohonal de Ibor =

Coordinates: 39°47′N 5°29′W

Bohonal de Ibor, Spain
- municipality
- Flag Coat of arms
- Interactive map of Bohonal de Ibor, Spain
- Country: Spain
- Autonomous community: Extremadura
- Province: Cáceres
- Municipality: Bohonal de Ibor

Area
  - Total: 64 km^{2} (25 sq mi)
- Elevation: 358 m (1,175 ft)

Population (2025-01-01)
  - Total: 488
  - Density: 7.6/km^{2} (20/sq mi)
- Time zone: UTC+1 (CET)
  - Summer (DST): UTC+2 (CEST)

Bohonal de Ibor (pronounced [bo(o)ˈnal dejˈβoɾ]) is a municipality located in the province of Cáceres, Extremadura, Spain. According to the 2006 census (INE), the municipality has a population of 542 inhabitants.

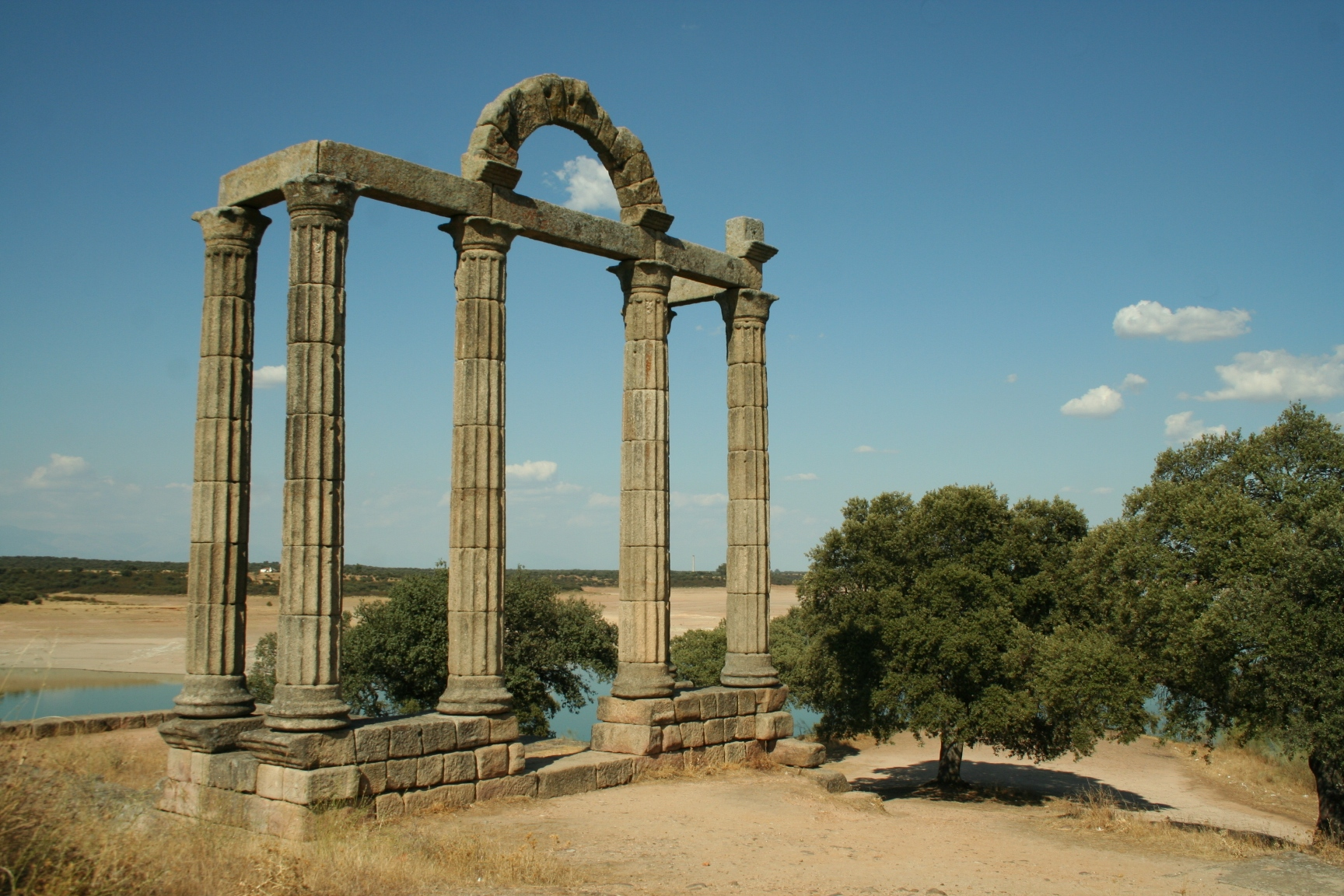
Columnata de Los Mármoles (2nd century AD)

== See also ==
- List of municipalities in Cáceres
