= Rodolfo Gaona =

Mexican matador (1888–1975)

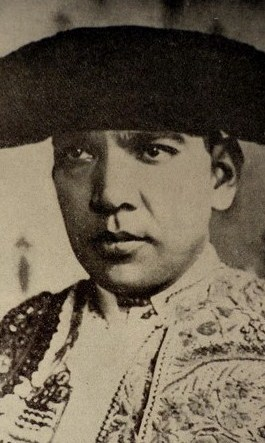

Personal information
- Nicknames: El Indio Grande; La Califa de León
- Born: Rodolfo Gaona y Jiménez; January 22, 1888 León, Guanajuato, Mexico
- Died: May 20, 1975 (aged 87) Mexico City, Mexico
- Spouse(s): Carmen Ruiz Moragas (1917-1917); Enriqueta Gómez Abascal (married 1925)

Sport
- Sport: Bullfighting
- Rank: Matador

Rodolfo Gaona y Jiménez (22 January 1888 – 20 May 1975), was a Mexican bullfighter who performed from 1905 until his retirement in 1925, primarily in Madrid. Known as El Indio Grande (The Big Indian) and La Califa de León (The Caliph of León), Gaona was part of the Golden Age of bullfighting in Spain alongside Juan Belmonte and Joselito. He invented the gaonera and pase del centenario moves.

== Biography ==
Gaona was born in León, Guanajuato City, Mexico on 22 January 1888 to Indigenous Mexican and Mulato parents. As a young man, Gaona was a tanner and practiced bullfighting with a group of friends at nearby ranches. He joined Saturnino "Ojitos" Frutos' bullfighting group in 1904. His first professional bullfighting appearance was at the Toreo de la Condesa on 1 October 1905 in Mexico City.

In early 1908, he traveled to Spain with Ojitos, who arranged for him to debut at the Puerta de Hierro in Madrid on 1 April, followed by appearances at the main plaza in Tetuán de las Victorias and the Palacio Vistalegre. In 1910, he first performed a move that would later be dubbed the gaonera, which included holding the capote behind himself and letting the bull pass through it. At a celebration for the 100th anniversary of Mexico's independence from Spain in 1921, Gaona invented the pase del centenario, or centennial pass, a variation of the gaonera.

Gaona's divorce from actress Carmen Ruiz Moragas, the mistress of King Alfonso XIII, attracted public ridicule. This had a severe effect on his concentration in the ring, particularly when detractors threw things at him. He returned to Mexico in 1920 when bullfighting was again legalized. Gaona retired on 12 April 1925 after a final performance at the Toreo de la Condesa, the same arena where he had made his maiden performance.

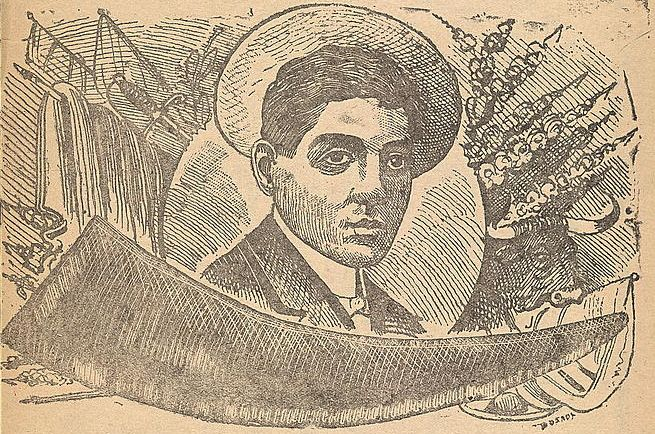
Rodolfo Gaona by José Guadalupe Posada.

== Personal life ==
While in Spain, Gaona briefly dated Paquita Escribano. His 1917 marriage and subsequent divorce from Carmen Ruiz Moragas provoked increased discussion about divorce in Spain and inspired the film La malcasada. In 1925, he married Enriqueta Gómez Abascal, a Spanish woman with whom he had three children. Gaona died on 20 May 1975 in Mexico City.

A street in Granada in the old bullfighters' neighborhood is named in his honor.
