= José Fernández Montaña =

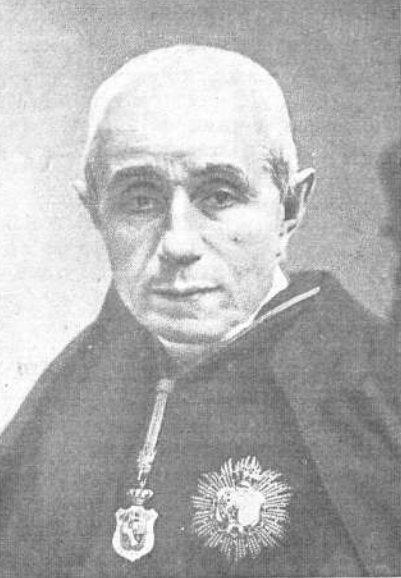
José Fernández Montaña

José Fernández Montaña (1842, El Franco, Asturias – 1935) was a Spanish priest, jurist, linguist, and historian.

== Works ==
- New Light and true judgment on Philip II Madrid: Printing & Kids Maroto 1882.
- Main features of Cardinal Cisneros, archbishop of Toledo, plus another on the Inquisition with appendix vindictive Philip II and the Royal Barefoot De Madrid. Madrid: Imp Hellenic, 1921.
- Philip II, the prudent, and politics. Typography of the Sacred Heart. No date (circa 1914).
- Felipe II slandered and Vindicated on points of Finance. With Appendices Proof of bulls and statements Protestant and schismatic Tertullian Against Madrid: Gregorio del Amo Sons, 1929.
- New edition of the works of Blessed John of Avila, Apostle of Andalusia. Printing of San Francisco de Sales, 1901.

== See also ==
- Alfonso XIII of Spain
