= Carmen Ruiz Moragas =

Spanish actress

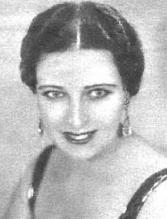

María del Carmen Ruiz Moragas (1898 – May 20, 1936) was a Spanish actress. For years, she was the mistress of King Alfonso XIII, with whom she had two children.

== Early life ==
Ruiz was born in Madrid, Spain. Her parents lived in Madrid but they were from Málaga.

In her long career in the Spanish theater industry she had the honor to participate in famous works made by directors well known and even in some European co-productions. She belonged to people dedicated to theater, but at the same time to the bourgeois class of Madrid. In the 1920s and 1930s, she was a lover of King Alfonso XIII and had two children with him: Leandro and María Teresa. She died of cancer in 1936.

== Career ==
She started her career as actress at age 20, when she finished working for María Guerrero company. She was a pioneer of silent films. She became a famous Spanish actress before the Spanish Civil War.

She acted throughout Spain but achieved great success representing dramas as Mother Joy, Malvaloca, In the 1920s, she became a famous dramatic actress. In the 1930s, Ruiz established a theater company and achieved success in theaters throughout Spain, including Madrid, Lara, Princess Beatriz, Princess Isabel, Pavón and Cervantes.

During the first half of the twentieth century, she worked mainly in the theater with Spanish actors such as Fernando Díaz de Mendoza, Enrique Rambal, Pepita Meliá and Carola Fernán Gómez.

== Personal life ==
She belonged to people dedicated to theater, but at the same time to the bourgeois class of Madrid. She married Mexican matador Rodolfo Gaona in Granada in 1917; the marriage did not last long. In the 1920s and the 1930s, she was mistress of King Alfonso XIII. By the king, she had two children:

- Anna María Teresa Ruiz y Moragas (9 October 1925 - 6 September 1965);
- Leandro Alfonso Luis Ruiz y Moragas (26 April 1929 - 18 June 2006).

Carmen became ill and died in 1936. Although their economic situation was not bad, their children received indirect help from their father. In 2003, Leandro used this as proof of his paternity, and obtained from the Spanish court the right for himself and his sister (posthumously) to use the surname Bourbon.

== Bibliography ==
- The real life and history of the theater (2005) Juan Join ISBN 84-7828-135-5 .
- Catálogo . ra Filmoteca española. (2003).
- Un siglo de cine español (1998), author: Luis Gasca enciclopedias Planeta ISBN 84-08-02309-8.
- Diccionario Akal de teatro (1997) author: Manuel Gómez García.ISBN 84-460-0827-0
- Historia del teatro María Guerrero (1998).
- The scene M.Fca.Vilches Madrid between 1926–1931 and Dru Dougherty (1998) Ed.Fundamentos. His career as an actor, director and entrepreneur during those years.
- Leandro de Borbón, mis padres, mi historia, (2007) Esfera de los libros.
- Newspapers of the time since the 1915s across Spain: La Vanguardia, ABC, El Heraldo de Madrid, El Sol, El Liberal, El Correo Vasco, La Voz, Ya, Blanco y Negro ...
