= Manuel García Hispaleto =

Spanish painter (1836–1898)

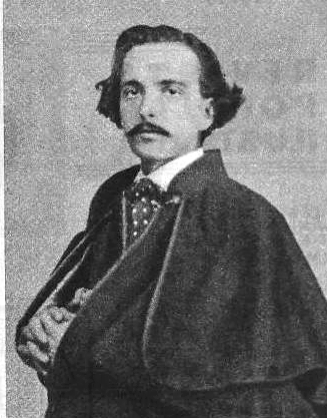
Manuel García Hispaleto (1862)

Manuel García Hispaleto, originally Manuel García y Martínez (22 November 1836 – 26 December 1898) was a Spanish painter; known for portraits and costumbrista scenes. His brother, Rafael García Hispaleto, was also a painter. Many sources refer to him as Manuel García y García, but his mother's maiden name appears to have been Martínez.

== Biography ==
He was born in Seville. His father operated an import sales business, but it was only moderately successful. In 1847, at the age of eleven, he began attending classes at the Real Academia de Bellas Artes de Santa Isabel de Hungría. His older brother, Rafael, also studied there and, in 1853, adopted the pseudonym "Hispaleto", a reference to the original Roman name for Seville: "Hispalis". After Rafael's early death, at the age of twenty-two, Manuel adopted the name in remembrance.

In 1854, he moved to Madrid to continue his studies at the "Escuela de Santa Catalina", a satellite school of the Real Academia de Bellas Artes de San Fernando. Beginning in 1860, he became a regular participant in the National Exhibition of Fine Arts and would have showings there until 1895. Some of his works were given medals. In 1871, he was also awarded the Order of Charles III.

In 1872, he returned to Seville, where he sought inspiration from the costumbrismos of Andalucia. Two years later, he went back to Madrid to take part in an exposition at the Real Fábrica de Platería Martínez. There, he met Esperanza Romero Cabrero; daughter of María del Rosario Cabrero, the proprietress of the Platería, and her husband, the poet Gregorio Romero Larrañaga. He remained in Madrid and, five years later, they were married at the Basílica pontificia de San Miguel. They had three children, one of whom died in infancy.

He was one of the founding members of the Sociedad de Acuarelistas (watercolorists) and attended their annual exhibitions. For many years, he was a professor at the Escuela de Artes y Oficios. He also worked on restoration projects at the Museo del Prado and produced some lithographs. He died in Madrid in 1898.

== Selected paintings ==
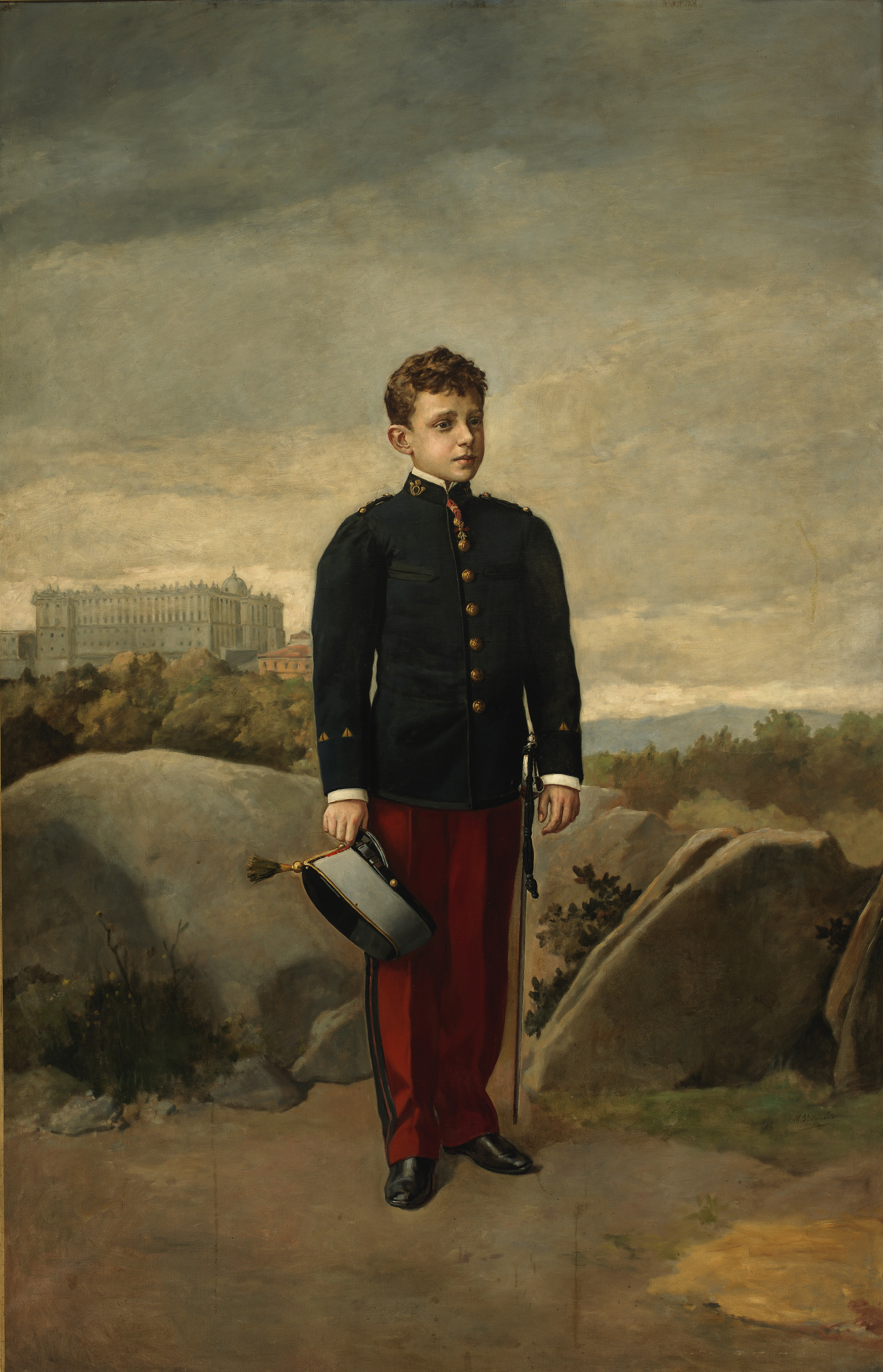
Alfonso XIII
as a Cadet

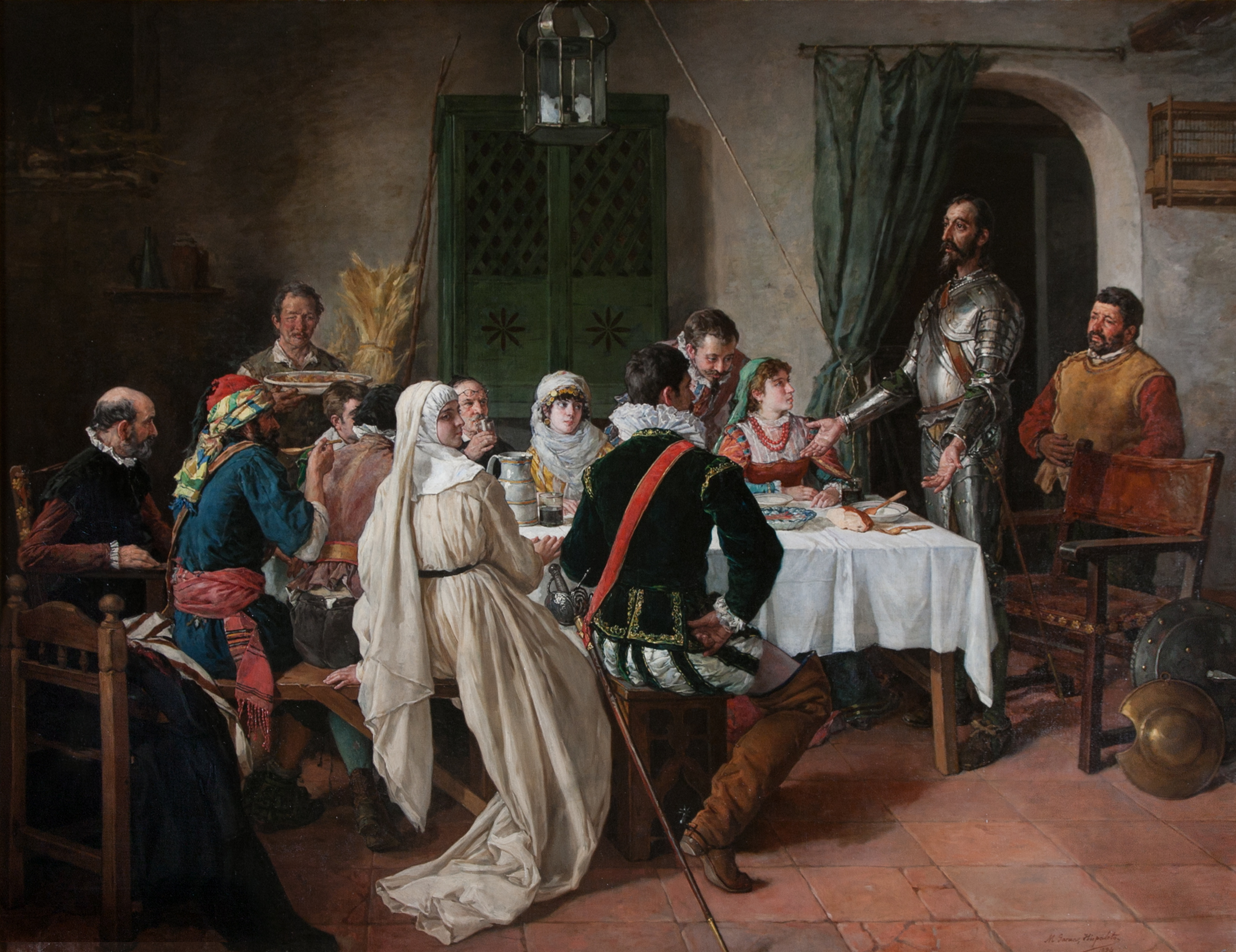
Don Quixote's Speech on Arms and Letters

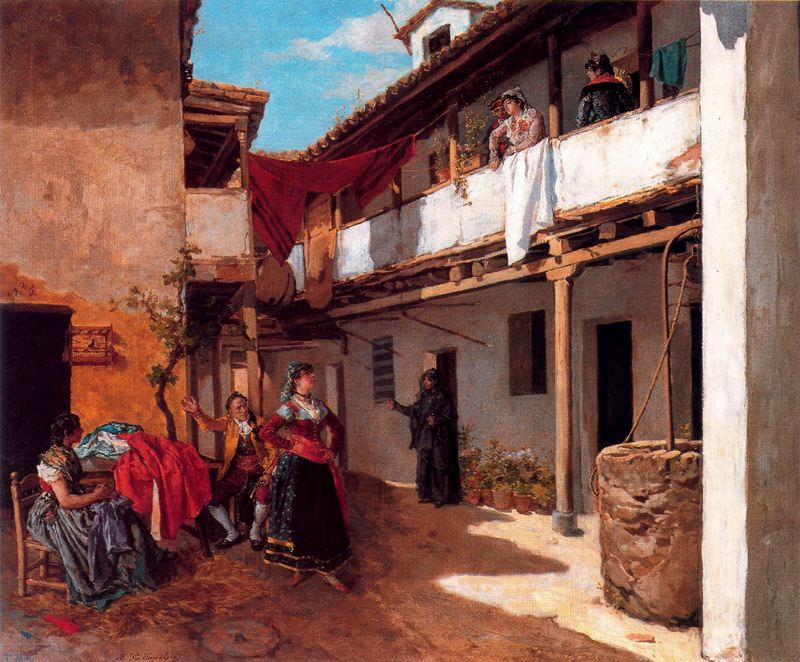
Casa de Tócame Roque

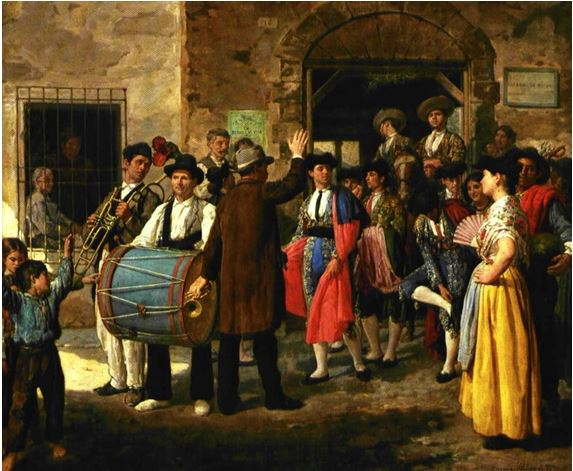
Entry of the Toreadors

== Sources ==
- Jesús García de Oteyza Fernández-Cid (2010). Los pintores sevillanos Rafael y Manuel García Hispaleto. Servicio de Publicaciones de la Diputación de Sevilla. ISBN 978-84-7798-291-3.
- Biography and works @ the Museo del Prado
- Biography @ the Real Academia de la Historia
