= Alfonso XIII =

King of Spain from 1886 to 1931

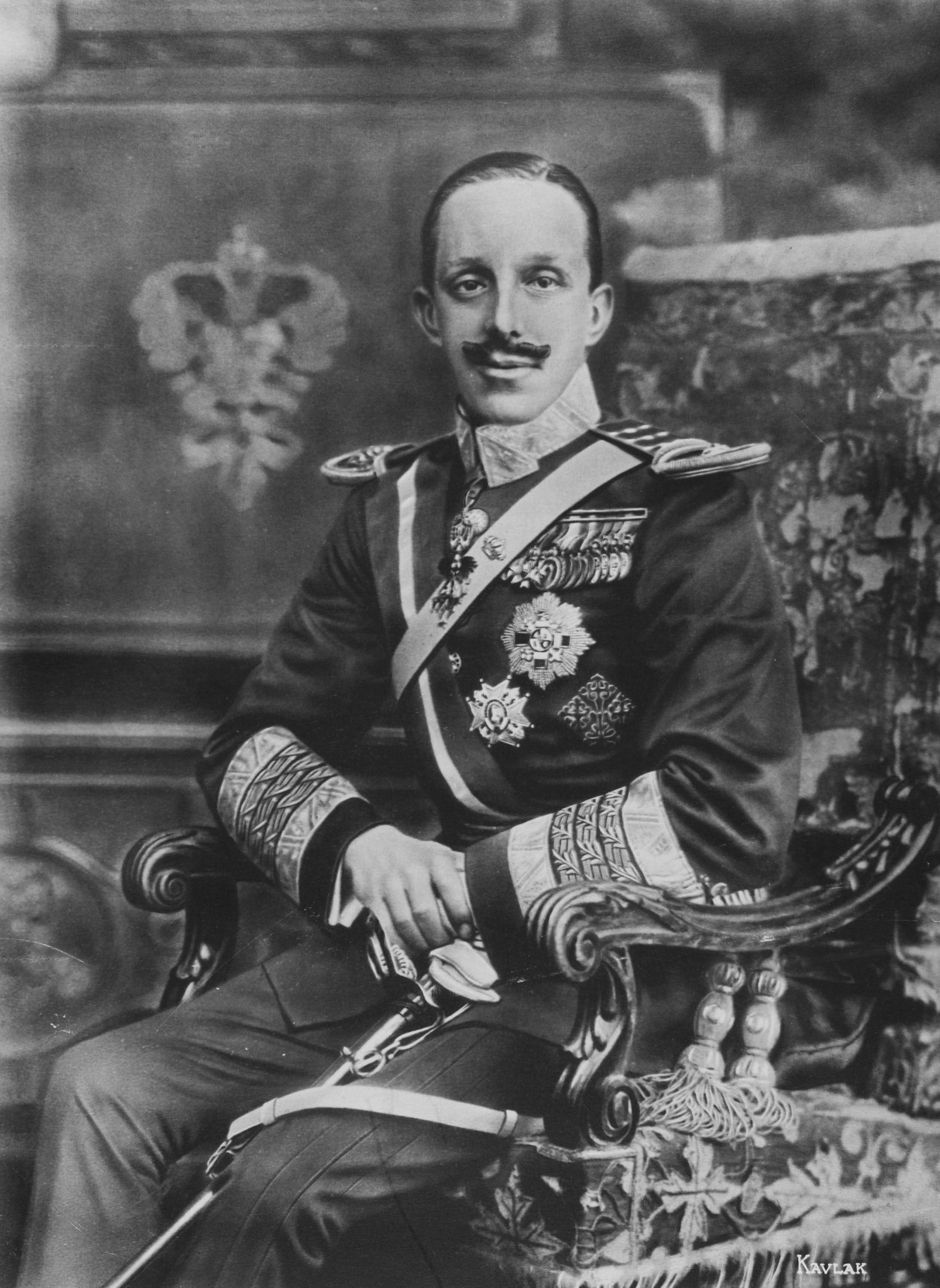
- Formal portrait, 1916

King of Spain
- Reign: 17 May 1886 – 14 April 1931
- Enthronement: 17 May 1902
- Predecessor: Alfonso XII
- Successor: Niceto Alcalá-Zamora (President of Spain, 1931); Juan Carlos I (King of Spain, 1975)
- Regent: Maria Christina (1886–1902)
- Born: 17 May 1886; Royal Palace of Madrid, Spain
- Died: 28 February 1941 (aged 54); Rome, Italy
- Burial: Santa Maria in Monserrato degli Spagnoli, Rome (until 1980); El Escorial, San Lorenzo de El Escorial (since 1980)
- Spouse: Victoria Eugenie of Battenberg (m. 1906)
- Issue Detail: Alfonso, Prince of Asturias; Infante Jaime, Duke of Segovia; Infanta Beatriz, Princess of Civitella-Cesi; Infanta María Cristina, Countess Marone; Infante Juan, Count of Barcelona; Infante Gonzalo
Names
- Spanish: Alfonso León Fernando María Santiago Isidro Pascual Antón de Borbón y de Habsburgo-Lorena; French: Alphonse Léon Ferdinand Marie Jacques Isidore Pascal Antoine de Bourbon
- House: Bourbon
- Father: Alfonso XII
- Mother: Maria Christina of Austria

Alfonso XIII (Note: In the languages of Spain, his name was: Aragonese: Alifonso XIII; Asturian: Alfonsu XIII; Basque: Alfontso XIII; Catalan: Alfons XIII; Occitan: Anfós XIII; Galician: Afonso XIII; Spanish: Alfonso XIII) (Spanish: Alfonso León Fernando María Jaime Isidro Pascual Antonio de Borbón y Habsburgo-Lorena; French: Alphonse Léon Ferdinand Marie Jacques Isidore Pascal Antoine de Bourbon; 17 May 1886 – 28 February 1941), also known as El Africano or the African for his Africanist views, was King of Spain from his birth until 14 April 1931, when the Second Spanish Republic was proclaimed. He became a monarch at birth as his father, Alfonso XII, had died the previous year. Alfonso's mother, Maria Christina of Austria, served as regent until he assumed full powers on his sixteenth birthday in 1902.

Alfonso XIII's upbringing and public image were closely linked to the military estate; he often presented himself as a soldier-king. His effective reign started four years after the Spanish–American War, when various social milieus projected their expectations of national regeneration onto him. Like other European monarchs of his time he played a political role, entailing a controversial use of his constitutional executive powers. His wedding to Princess Victoria Eugenie of Battenberg in 1906 was marred by an attempt at regicide; he was unharmed.

With public opinion divided over World War I, and moreover a split between pro-German and pro-Entente sympathizers, Alfonso XIII used his relations with other European royal families to help preserve a stance of neutrality, as espoused by his government; however, several factors weakened the monarch's constitutional legitimacy: the rupture of the turno system, the deepening of the Restoration system crisis in the 1910s, a trio of crises in 1917, the spiral of violence in Morocco, and especially the lead-up to the 1923 installment of the dictatorship of Miguel Primo de Rivera, an event that succeeded by means of both military coup d'état and the king's acquiescence. Over the course of his reign, the monarch ended up favouring an authoritarian solution rather than constitutional liberalism.

Upon the political failure of the dictatorship, Alfonso XIII removed support from Primo de Rivera (who was thereby forced to resign in 1930) and favoured (during the dictablanda) an attempted return to the pre-1923 state of affairs. Nevertheless, he had lost most of his political capital along the way. He left Spain voluntarily after the municipal elections of April 1931 – which was understood as a plebiscite on maintaining the monarchy or declaring a republic – the result of which led to the proclamation of the Second Spanish Republic on 14 April 1931.

For his efforts with the European War Office during World War I, he earned a nomination for the Nobel Peace Prize in 1917, which was ultimately won by the Red Cross. As of 2026, he remains the only monarch known to have been nominated for a Nobel Prize.

== Reign ==
=== Early life and education ===
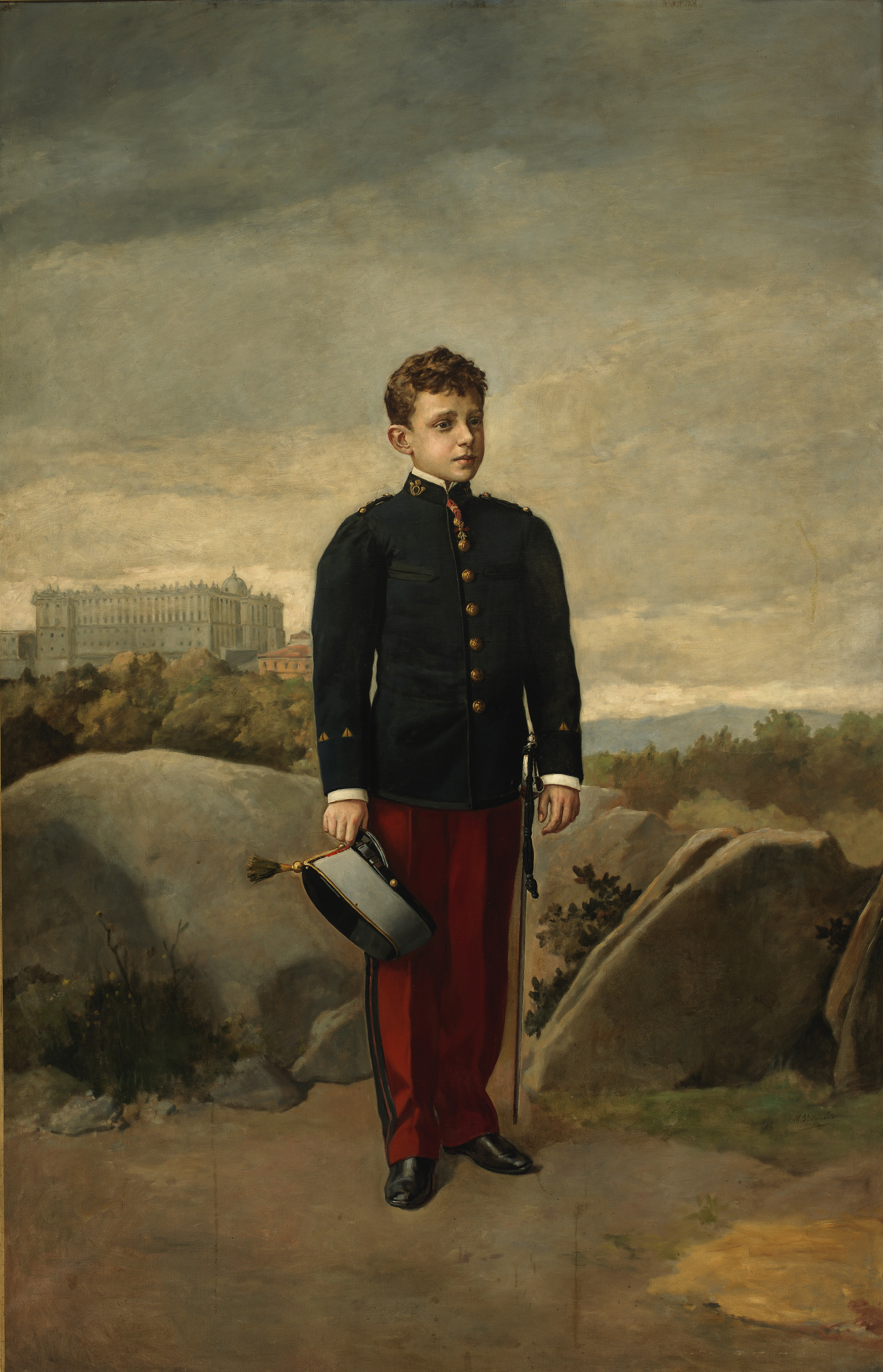
Alfonso XIII as a cadet; by Manuel García Hispaleto

Alfonso XIII was born at the Royal Palace of Madrid on 17 May 1886. He was the posthumous son of Alfonso XII of Spain, who had died in November 1885, and became king upon his birth. Just after he was born, he was carried naked to the prime minister Práxedes Mateo Sagasta on a silver tray.

Five days later, he was carried in a solemn court procession with a Golden Fleece around his neck and was baptised with water specially brought from the River Jordan in Palestine. The French newspaper Le Figaro described the young king in 1889 as "the happiest and best-loved of all the rulers of the earth". His mother, Maria Christina of Austria, served as his regent until his sixteenth birthday. During the regency, in 1898, Spain lost its colonial rule over Cuba, Puerto Rico, Guam and the Philippines to the United States as a result of the Spanish–American War.

Alfonso became seriously ill during the 1889–1890 pandemic. His health deteriorated around 10 January 1890, and doctors reported his condition as the flu attacked his nervous system leaving the young king in a state of indolence. He eventually recovered.

When Alfonso came of age in May 1902, the week of his majority was marked by festivities, bullfights, balls and receptions throughout Spain. He took his oath to the constitution before members of the Cortes on 17 May.

Alfonso received, to a large extent, a military education that imbued him with "a Spanish nationalism strengthened by his military vocation". Besides the clique of military tutors, Alfonso also received political teachings from a liberal, Vicente Santamaría de Paredes, and moral precepts from an integrist, José Fernández de la Montaña.

=== Engagement and marriage ===
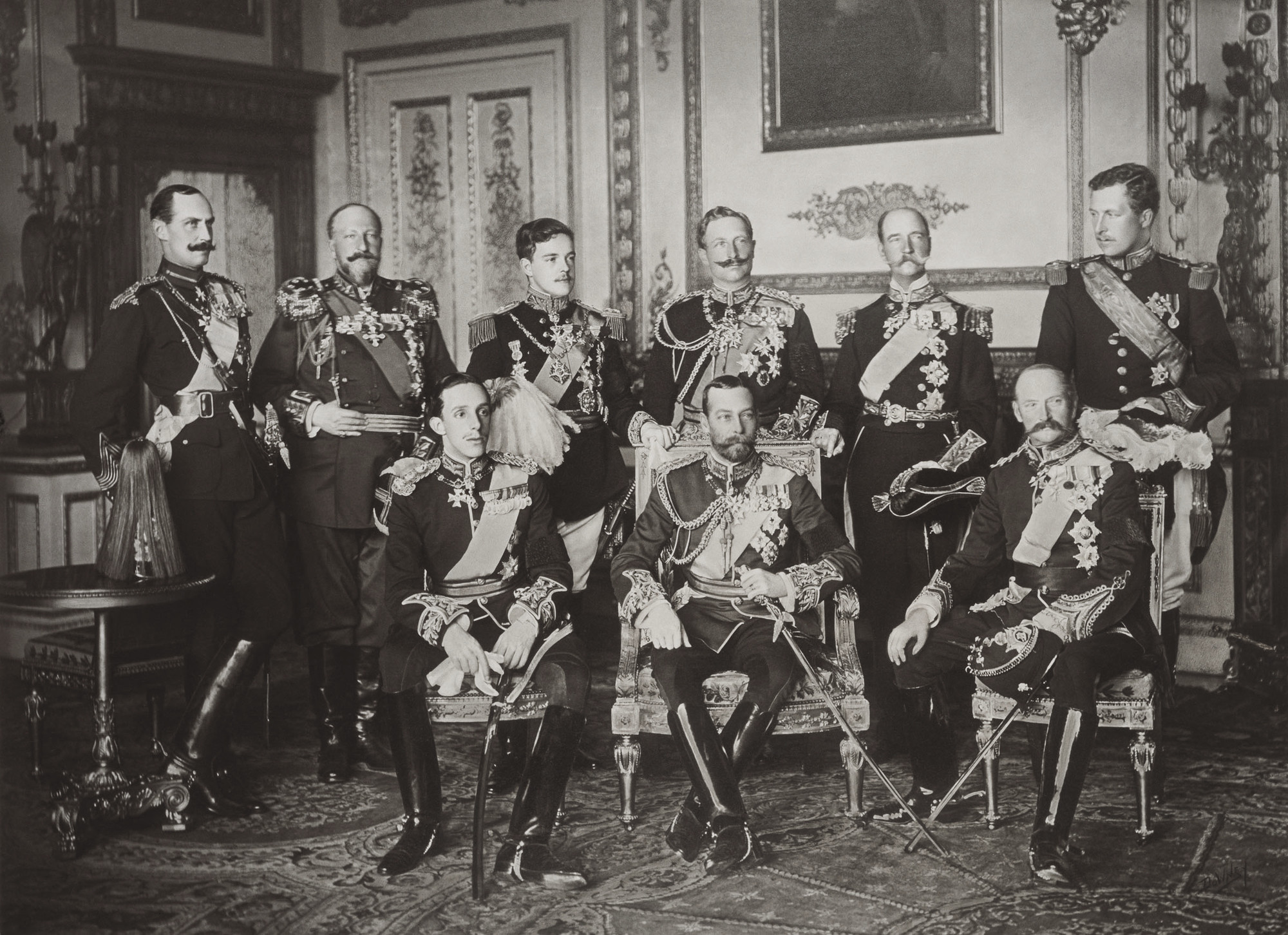
The Nine Sovereigns at Windsor for the funeral of King Edward VII, photographed on 20 May 1910. Standing, from left to right: Haakon VII of Norway, Ferdinand I of Bulgaria, Manuel II of Portugal, Wilhelm II of Germany, George I of Greece and Albert I of Belgium. Seated, from left to right: Alfonso XIII of Spain, George V of the United Kingdom and Frederick VIII of Denmark.

By 1905, Alfonso was looking for a suitable consort. On a state visit to the United Kingdom, he stayed in London at Buckingham Palace with King Edward VII. There he met Princess Victoria Eugenie of Battenberg, the daughter of Edward VII's youngest sister Princess Beatrice, and a granddaughter of Queen Victoria. He found her attractive, and she returned his interest. There were obstacles to the marriage. Victoria was a Protestant, and would have to become a Catholic. Victoria's brother, Leopold, was a haemophiliac, so there was a 50 percent chance that Victoria was a carrier of the trait. Finally, Alfonso's mother Maria Christina wanted him to marry a member of her family, the House of Habsburg-Lorraine, or some other Catholic princess, as she considered the Battenbergs to be non-dynastic.

Victoria was willing to change her religion, and her being a haemophilia carrier was only a possibility. Maria Christina was eventually persuaded to drop her opposition. In January 1906 she wrote an official letter to Princess Beatrice proposing the match. Victoria met Maria Christina and Alfonso in Biarritz, France, later that month, and converted to Catholicism in San Sebastián in March.

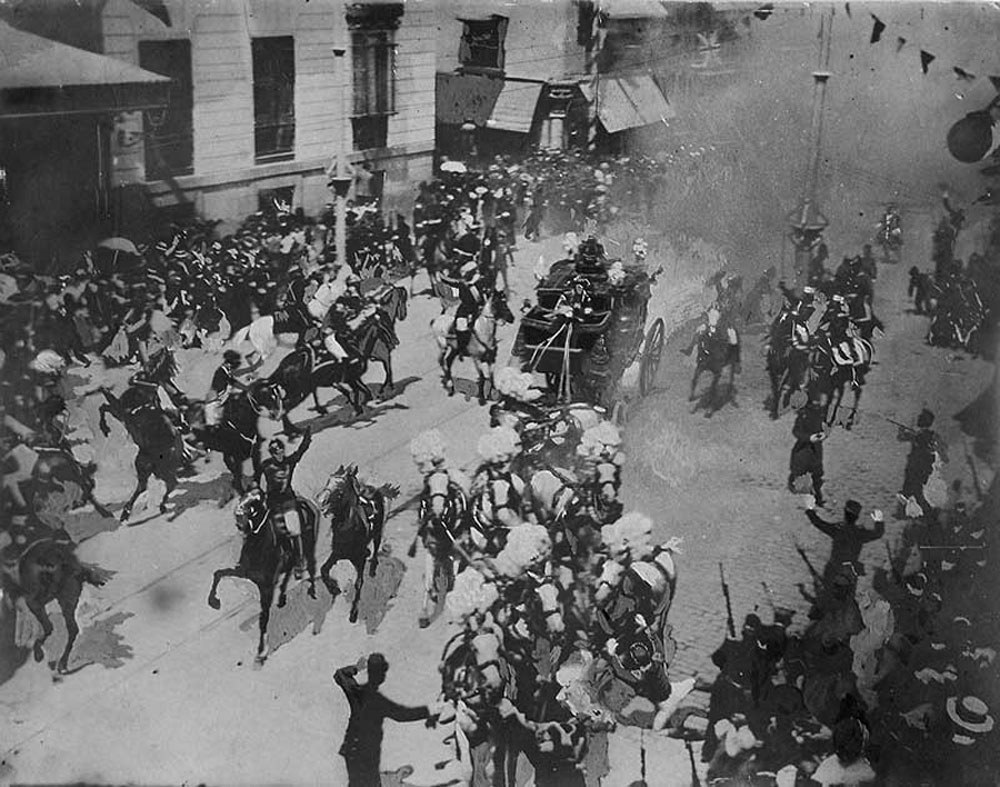
Photograph taken moments after the assassination attempt on Alfonso and Victoria Eugenie on their wedding day

In May, diplomats of both kingdoms officially executed the agreement of marriage. Alfonso and Victoria were married at the Royal Monastery of San Jerónimo in Madrid on 31 May 1906, with British royalty in attendance, including Victoria's cousins the Prince and Princess of Wales (later King George V and Queen Mary). The wedding was marked by an assassination attempt on Alfonso and Victoria by Catalan anarchist Mateu Morral. As the wedding procession returned to the palace, he threw a bomb from a window which killed 30 bystanders and members of the procession, while 100 others were wounded. The royal couple was saved by a carriage lined with bulletproof material developed by the Polish inventor Jan Szczepanik.

On 10 May 1907, the couple's first child, Alfonso, Prince of Asturias, was born. Victoria was in fact a haemophilia carrier, and Alfonso inherited the condition.

Neither of the two daughters born to the King and Queen were haemophilia carriers, but another of their sons, Gonzalo (1914–1934), had the condition. Alfonso distanced himself from his wife for transmitting the condition to their sons. From 1914 on, he had several mistresses, and fathered five illegitimate children. A sixth illegitimate child had been born before his marriage.

=== World War I ===
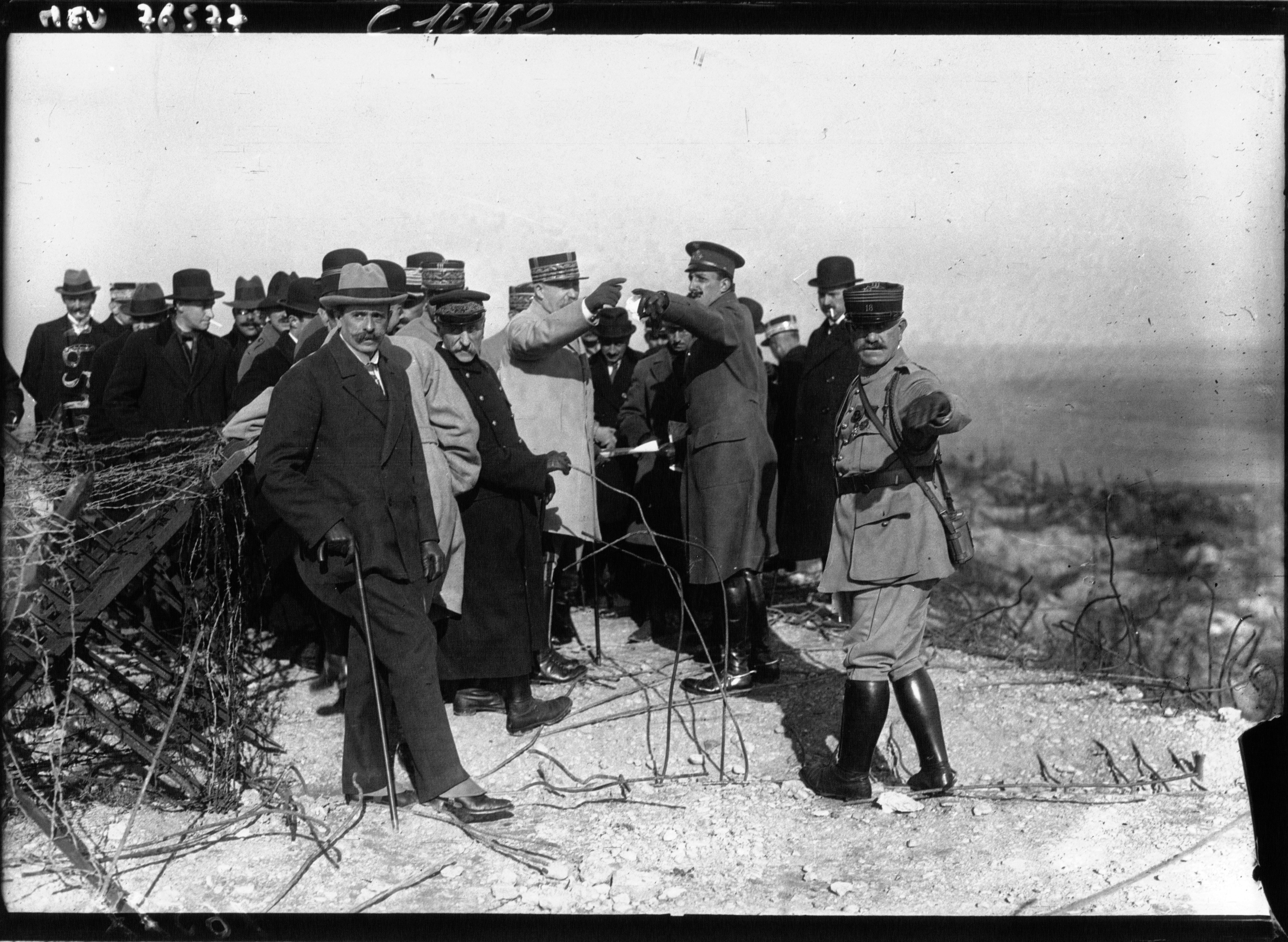
Alfonso XIII visiting Verdun in 1919

During World War I, because of his family connections with both sides and the division of popular opinion, Spain remained neutral. The King established an office for assistance to prisoners of war on all sides. This office used the Spanish diplomatic and military network abroad to intercede for thousands of POWs – transmitting and receiving letters for them, and other services. The office was located in the Royal Palace.

Alfonso attempted to save the Russian Tsar Nicholas II and his family from the Bolsheviks who captured them, sending two telegrams offering the Russian imperial family refuge in Spain. He later learned of the execution of the Romanov family, but was mistaken in believing that only Nicholas II and his son Alexei had been killed. As such, he continued to push for the Tsarina Alexandra, a first cousin of Victoria Eugenie, and her four daughters to be brought to Spain, not realising that they had also been murdered.

Alfonso became gravely ill during the 1918 flu pandemic. Spain was neutral and thus under no wartime censorship restrictions, so his illness and subsequent recovery were reported to the world, while flu outbreaks in the belligerent countries were concealed. This gave the misleading impression that Spain was the most affected area and led to the pandemic being dubbed "the Spanish Flu".

=== Cracking of the system and dictatorship ===
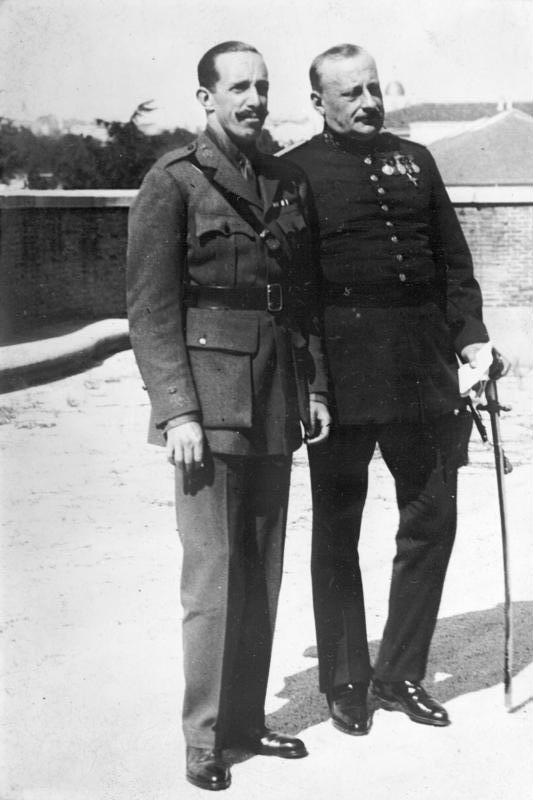
Alfonso (left) with his dictatorial prime minister, Miguel Primo de Rivera

Following World War I, Spain entered the lengthy yet victorious Rif War (1920–1926) to preserve its colonial rule over northern Morocco. Critics of the monarchy thought the war was an unforgivable loss of money and lives, and nicknamed Alfonso el Africano ("the African"). Alfonso had not acted as a strict constitutional monarch, and supported the Africanists who wanted to conquer for Spain a new empire in Africa to compensate for the lost empire in the Americas and elsewhere. The Rif War had starkly polarized Spanish society between the Africanists who wanted to conquer an empire in Africa vs. the abandonistas who wanted to abandon Morocco as not worth the blood and treasure. Alfonso liked to play favourites with his generals, and one of his most favoured generals was Manuel Fernández Silvestre. In 1921, when Silvestre advanced up into the Rif mountains of Morocco, Alfonso sent him a telegram whose first line read "Hurrah for real men!", urging Silvestre not to retreat at a time when Silvestre was experiencing major difficulties. Silvestre stayed the course, leading his men into the Battle of Annual, one of Spain's worst defeats. Alfonso, who was on holiday in the south of France at the time, was informed of the "Disaster of the Annual" while he was playing golf. Reportedly, Alfonso's response to the news was to shrug his shoulders and say "Chicken meat is cheap", before resuming his game. Alfonso remained in France and did not return to Spain to comfort the families of the soldiers lost in the battle, which many people at the time saw as a callous and cold act, a sign that the King was indifferent over the lives of his soldiers. In 1922, the Cortes started an investigation into the responsibility for the Annual disaster and soon discovered evidence that the King had been one of the main supporters of Silvestre's advance into the Rif mountains.

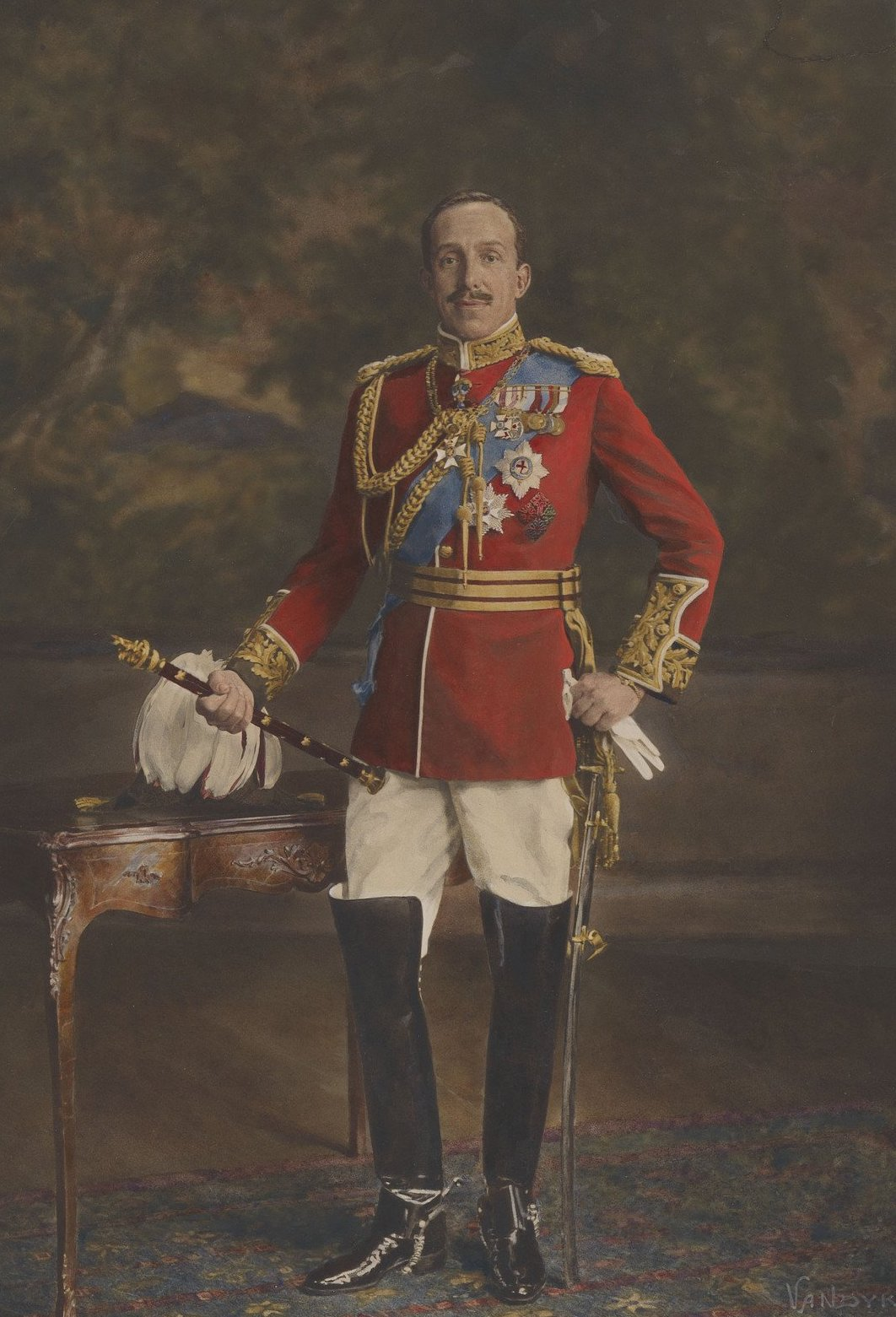
Alfonso in uniform of field marshal of the United Kingdom, 1928

After the "Disaster of the Annual", Spain's war in the Rif went from bad to worse, and as the Spanish were barely hanging on to Morocco, support for the abandonistas grew as many people could see no point to the war. In August 1923, Spanish soldiers embarking for Morocco mutinied, other soldiers in Málaga simply refused to board the ships that were to take them to Morocco, while in Barcelona huge crowds of left-wingers had staged anti-war protests at which Spanish flags were burned while the flag of the Rif Republic was waved about. With the Africanists comprising only a minority, it was clear that it was only a matter of time before the abandonistas forced the Spanish to give up on the Rif, which was part of the reason for the military coup d'état later in 1923.

On 13 September 1923, Miguel Primo de Rivera, Captain General of Catalonia, staged a military coup with the collaboration from a quad of Africanist generals based in Madrid (José Cavalcanti, Federico Berenguer, Leopoldo Saro and Antonio Dabán). These generals were associated with the innermost military clique of Alfonso XIII and wanted to prevent investigations about Annual from tarnishing the monarch, even if Primo de Rivera had embraced Abandonista positions prior to that point. Primo de Rivera ruled as a dictator with the king's support until January 1930.

During the dictatorship, the king increased his public presence, siding with a Catholic, anti-Catalanist, dictatorial and militarist brand of Spanish nationalism.

In 1925, Alfonso was the target of an assassination plot by Catalan separatists while in Barcelona. While the attempt was foiled, Miguel Primo de Rivera used the incident to further solidify his rule.

On 28 January 1930, amid economic problems, general unpopularity and a putschist plot led by General Manuel Goded in motion, of which Alfonso XIII was most probably aware, Miguel Primo de Rivera was forced to resign, exiling to Paris, only to die a few weeks later of the complications from diabetes in combination with the effects of a flu. Alfonso XIII appointed General Dámaso Berenguer as the new prime minister. Back in 1926, Alfonso XIII had appointed Berenguer as Chief of Staff of the Military House of the King, a post conventionally fit for burned-out generals in order to move them away from the spotlight for a time in a show of affection. The new period was nicknamed as dictablanda. The King was so closely associated with the dictatorship of Primo de Rivera that it was difficult for him to distance himself from the regime that he had supported for almost seven years. The enforced changes relied on the incorrect assumption that Spaniards would accept the notion that nothing had happened after 1923 and that going back to the prior state of things was possible.

== Dethronement and politics in exile ==
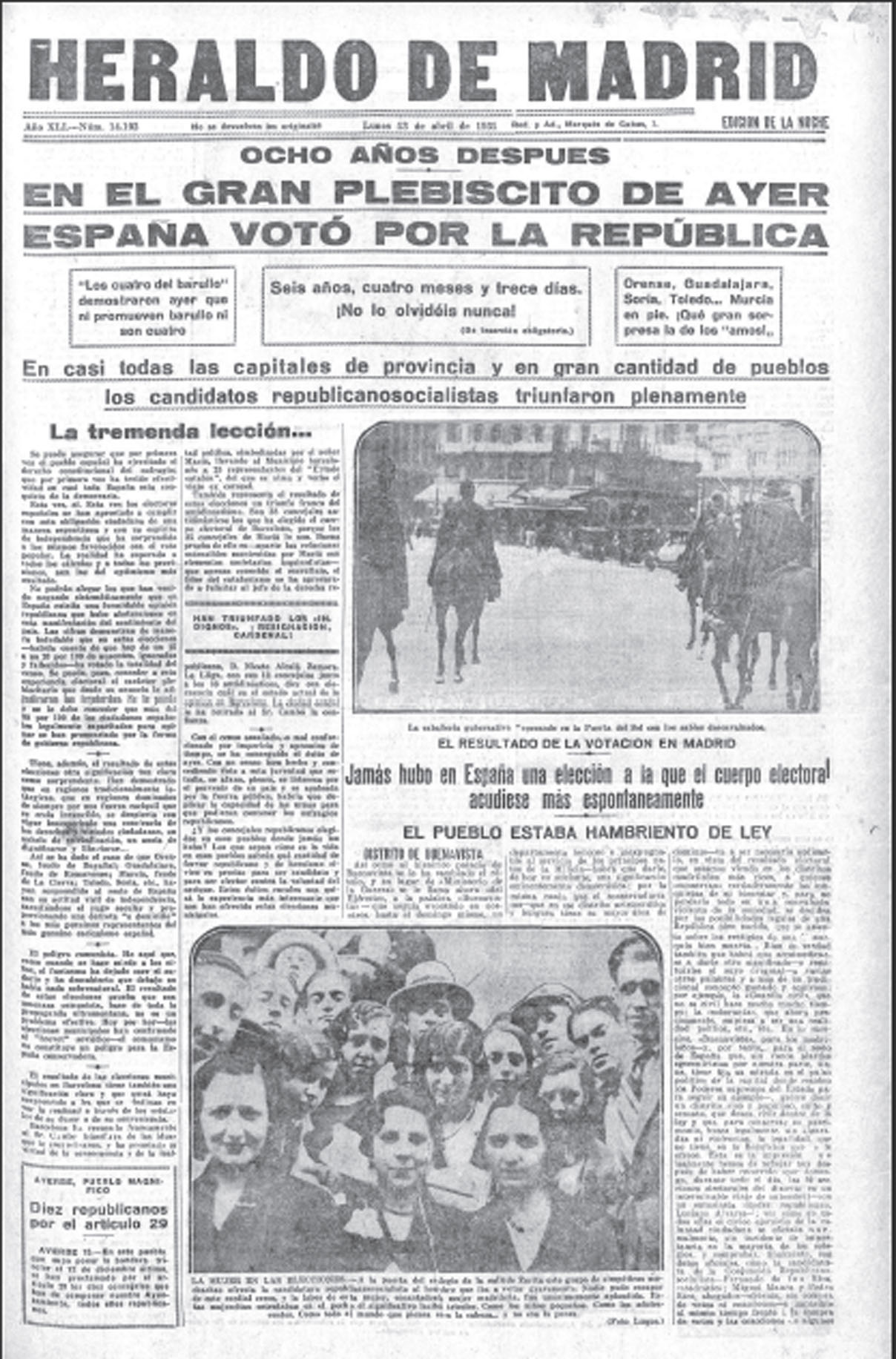
13 April 1931 Heraldo de Madrid frontpage reporting the Republican victory

On 12 April, the Republican coalition, short of winning a majority of councillors overall, won a sweeping majority in major cities in the 1931 municipal elections, which were perceived as a plebiscite on monarchy. The results shocked the government, with foreign minister Romanones admitting to the press an "absolute monarchist defeat" and Civil Guard honcho José Sanjurjo reportedly telling government ministers that, given circumstances, the Armed Forces could not be "absolutely" relied upon for the sustainment of the monarchy. Alfonso XIII fled the country and the Second Spanish Republic was peacefully proclaimed on 14 April 1931.

In November 1931, the Constituent Republican Cortes held an impassionate debate about the political responsibilities of the former monarch. Some of the grievances against the actions of Alfonso XIII as a king included interference in state institutions to reinforce his personal power, bargaining personal support from the military clique with rewards and merits, his abuse of the power to dissolve the legislature, rendering the co-sovereignty between the Nation and the Crown a total fiction; that he had disproportionately fostered the Armed forces (often to contain internal protest), had used the armed forces abroad with imperialist aims alien to the interests of the nation but his own, that he had personally devised the military operation of Annual behind the back of the Council of Ministers, and that following the massacre of Annual that "cost the lives of thousands of Spanish lads", he had decided to launch a coup with the help of a few generals rather than facing scrutiny in the legislature.

Other than Romanones, who exculpated the actions of the monarch, disconformity towards the Primo de Rivera dictatorship notwithstanding, no other legislator intervened in his favour, with the debate focusing on whether to label the monarch's actions as a military rebellion, lèse-majesté, high treason, or even condemning "a delinquent personality" or "a wholly punishable life". The debate ended with an eloquent speech by Prime Minister Manuel Azaña pleading for the unanimity of the house "to condemn and exclude D. Alfonso de Borbón from the law, proclaiming the majesty of our republic, the unbreakable will of our civism and the permanence of the Spanish glories framed by the institutions freely given by the Nation". The house passed the act brought forward by the Commission of Responsibilities, summarizing Alfonso de Borbón's responsibilities as being guilty of high treason.

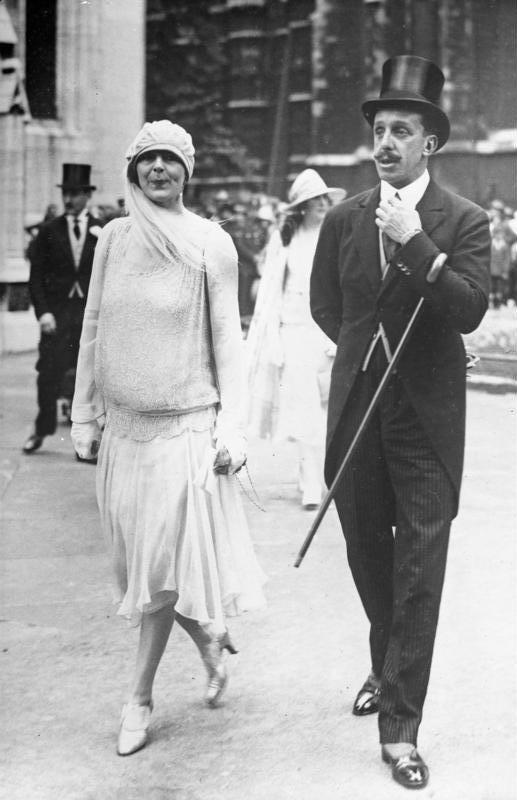
The former king in London in 1932

Involved in anti-Republican plots from his exile, and keen to draw support from the Carlists in the context of the uneasy and competing relations between the Carlist and Alfonsist factions within the radicalised monarchist camp, in the aftermath of so-called Pact of Territet he issued a statement dated 23 January 1932 endorsing the manifesto launched by Carlist claimant Alfonso Carlos (in which the latter hinted at the cession of dynastic rights should the former king accept "those fundamental principles which in our traditional regime have been demanded of all Kings with precedence of personal rights"), with the dethroned king likewise accusing in the document the reformist Republic to be "inspired and sponsored by communism, freemasonry and judaism".

In 1933, his two eldest sons, Alfonso and Jaime, renounced their claims to the defunct throne on the same day, and in 1934 his youngest son Gonzalo died. This left his third son Juan his only male heir.

After the July 1936 attempted coup d'état against the democratically elected Republican government a war broke out in Spain. On 30 July 1936, Alfonso's son Juan took the initiative of leaving Cannes to go to Spain to join the rebel faction, with the former king (then in a hunting trip in Czechoslovakia) reportedly giving consent, so Juan de Borbón crossed the border set to join the front in Somosierra dressed in a blue jumpsuit and red beret under the fake name "Juan López". However, rebel general Emilio Mola, mastermind behind the putschist plot, was warned of the move and had Juan returned. The former king made it clear he favoured the rebel faction against the Republican government. In September 1936, the general who had emerged as leader of the rebel faction, Francisco Franco, declared that he would not restore Alfonso as king.

== Death ==
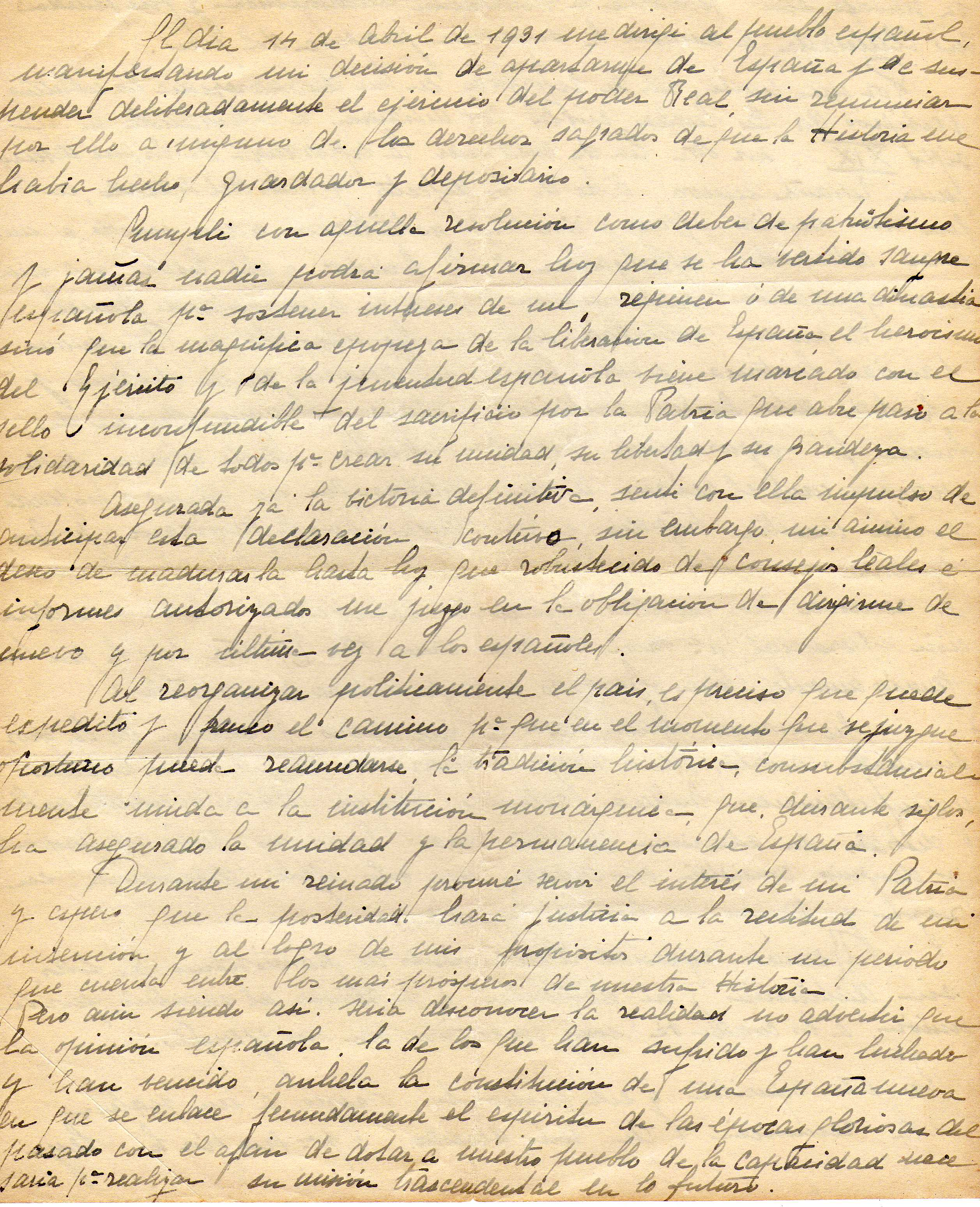
Ending part of the January 1941 renouncement manuscript

On 15 January 1941, Alfonso XIII renounced his rights to the defunct Spanish throne in favour of Juan. Reports of deteriorating health involving his heart began to circulate about four weeks later. He died in Rome on 28 February 1941 following weeks in agony after a severe attack of angina pectoris.

In Spain, dictator Francisco Franco ordered three days of national mourning. The ex-king's funeral was held in Rome in the Church of Santa Maria degli Angeli e dei Martiri. He was buried in the Church of Santa Maria in Monserrato degli Spagnoli, the Spanish national church in Rome, immediately below the tombs of Pope Callixtus III and Pope Alexander VI. In January 1980 his remains were transferred to El Escorial in Spain.

== Legacy ==
Alfonso was a promoter of tourism in Spain. The need for the lodging of his wedding guests prompted the construction of the luxurious Hotel Palace in Madrid. He also supported the creation of a network of state-run lodges, Paradores, in historic buildings of Spain. His fondness for the sport of football led to the patronage of several "royal" ("real" in Spanish) football clubs, the first being Real Club Deportivo de La Coruña in 1907. Selected others include Real Madrid, Real Sociedad, Real Betis, Real Unión, Espanyol, Real Zaragoza and Real Racing Club.

An avenue in the northern Madrid neighbourhood of Chamartín, Avenida de Alfonso XIII, is named after him. A plaza or town centre in Iloilo City, Philippines (now Plaza Libertad) was named in his honour called Plaza Alfonso XIII. A street in Merthyr Tydfil, in Wales, was built especially to house Spanish immigrants in the mining industry and named Alphonso Street after Alfonso XIII. In Paris’ 16th arrondissement, there is also Avenue Alphonse XIII, named for him.

Ratoncito Pérez first appeared as the Spanish equivalent to the Tooth Fairy in a 1894 tale written by Luis Coloma for King Alfonso XIII, who had just lost a milk tooth at the age of eight, with the King appearing in the tale as "King Buby". The tale has been adapted into further literary works and movies since then, with the character of King Buby appearing in some. The tradition of Ratoncito Pérez replacing the lost milk teeth with a small payment or gift while the child sleeps is almost universally followed today in Spain and Hispanic America. Alfonso XIII is also mentioned on the plaque that the City Council of Madrid dedicated in 2003 to Ratoncito Pérez on the second floor of number eight of Calle del Arenal, where the mouse was said to have lived.

== Personal life ==
=== Legitimate and illegitimate children ===
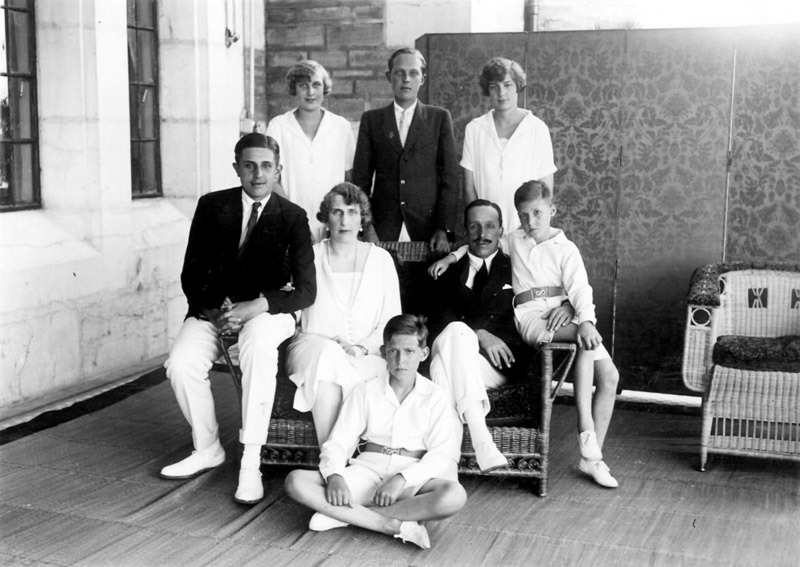
King Alfonso XIII and Queen Victoria Eugenie with their children at Santander's Palacio de la Magdalena. Standing, from left to right: Infanta María Cristina, the Prince of Asturias and Infanta Beatriz. Seated, from left to right: Infante Jaime, the Queen, the King, Infante Gonzalo and Infante Juan seated on ground.

Alfonso and his wife Princess Victoria Eugenie of Battenberg (Ena) had seven children:

1. Alfonso, Prince of Asturias (10 May 1907 – 6 September 1938);
2. Infante Jaime, Duke of Segovia (23 May 1908 – 20 March 1975);
3. Infanta Beatriz (22 June 1909 – 22 November 2002);
4. Infante Fernando (stillborn 21 May 1910);
5. Infanta María Cristina (12 December 1911 – 23 December 1996);
6. Infante Juan, Count of Barcelona (20 June 1913 – 1 April 1993);
7. Infante Gonzalo (24 October 1914 – 13 August 1934).

Alfonso also had a number of reported illegitimate children that are known, including:

- Roger Marie Vincent Philippe Lévêque de Vilmorin (1905–1980; by French aristocrat Mélanie de Gaufridy de Dortan, married to Philippe de Vilmorin);
- Juana Alfonsa Milán y Quiñones de León (1916–2005; by Alfonso's governess Béatrice Noon);
- Anna María Teresa Ruiz y Moragas (1925–1965; by Spanish actress Carmen Ruiz Moragas)
- Leandro Alfonso Luis Ruiz y Moragas (1929–2016; by Spanish actress Carmen Ruiz Moragas);
- Carmen Gravina (1926–2006; by Carmen de Navascués).

=== Attitude towards Jews ===
Alfonso was known for his friendly attitude towards Jews and publicly praised them. He took several actions to offer them protection. In 1917, Alfonso instructed the Spanish consul in Jerusalem, Antonio de la Cierva y Lewita, Count of Ballobar, to help protect Palestinian Jews. On another occasion, after a high official in Tetuan had committed onslaughts against Jews, a delegation composed of Catholics, Jews, and Muslims appealed to Alfonso. The King then removed the Tetuan official from power, in spite of the fact that the official possessed the support of the Spanish Minister of Foreign Affairs. According to the Jewish Professor Abraham S.E. Yahuda, Alfonso told Yahuda in private conversations that he would issue no policies of discrimination towards Jews, believing all of his Spanish subjects to be entitled to equal rights and protection. In 1932 his attitude changed and he embraced the Judeo-Masonic-Communist conspiracy theory.

=== Pornographic cinema ===
Alfonso is occasionally referred to as "the playboy king", due in part to his promotion and collection of Spanish pornographic films, as well as his extramarital affairs. Alfonso commissioned pornographic films through the Barcelona production company Royal Films, with the Count of Romanones acting as an intermediary figure between him and the company. Between forty and seventy pornographic films are said to have been shot in total (three of which have been preserved) and were screened in Barcelona's Chinatown, as well as during Alfonso's private screenings. The films, while silent and in black and white, were nonetheless very explicit for the time, showing full nudity and sex scenes. These films featured content considered immoral and degenerate, including sexual relationships involving Catholic priests and "women with enormous breasts" (the last of which is said to have been Alfonso's passion). This has led some to speculate that Alfonso may have possessed a sexual addiction. Most of these films were later destroyed during Franco's regime.

== Heraldry ==
Heraldry of Alfonso XIII of Spain

Coat of arms of Alfonso XIII
(1886–1924/1931)

Coat of arms of Alfonso XIII
(1924/1931)

Achievement Coat of arms of Alfonso XIII
(1924/1931)

== Honours ==
Guidon (Military Flag) of King Alfonso XIII

Royal Monogram

=== Spanish honours ===
Some of the most relevant honors are:

- Grand Master of the Order of Isabella the Catholic, 1886, with Collar, 1927
- Grand Master and Founder of the Civil Order of Alfonso XII, 23 May 1902
- Grand Master and Founder of the Order of Civil Merit, 25 June 1926
- Grand Master of the maestranzas de caballería (Royal Cavalry Armories) of Ronda, Sevilla, Granada, Valencia and Zaragoza

=== French dynastic honours ===
- (Kingdom of France) House of Bourbon-France: Sovereign and Knight of the Royal Order of Saint Michael
- (Kingdom of France) House of Bourbon-France: Sovereign and Knight of the Royal Order of the Holy Spirit
- (Kingdom of France) House of Bourbon-France: Sovereign and Knight of the Royal and Military Order of Saint Louis

=== Foreign honours ===
- (Austrian Empire) (Kingdom of Hungary) Austria-Hungary: Grand Cross of the Royal Hungarian Order of St. Stephen, 1900
- Belgium: Grand Cordon of the Order of Leopold, 1902
- Czechoslovakia: Collar of the White Lion, 28 April 1925
- Denmark: Knight of the Elephant, 20 July 1901
- France: Grand Cross of the Legion of Honour, January 1903
- Kingdom of Prussia: Knight of the Black Eagle
- Kingdom of Bavaria: Knight of St. Hubert, 1904
- Grand Duchy of Hesse: Grand Cross of the Ludwig Order, 23 August 1910
- Kingdom of Saxony: Knight of the Rue Crown
- Württemberg: Grand Cross of the Württemberg Crown, 1890
- Kingdom of Italy: Knight of the Annunciation, 20 September 1900
- Sovereign Military Order of Malta: Bailiff Grand Cross of Honour and Devotion
- Empire of Japan: Collar of the Order of the Chrysanthemum, 1930 (Note: Emperor Hirohito's second brother, Prince Takamatsu, travelled to Madrid to confer the Great Collar of the Chrysanthemum on King Alfonso. This honour was intended, in part, to commemorate the diplomatic and trading history which existed long before other Western nations were officially aware of Japan's existence. Prince Takamatsu travelled with his wife, Princess Takamatsu, to Spain. Her symbolic role in this unique mission to the Spanish Court was intended to emphasize the international links which were forged by her 16th-century ancestor, Ieyasu Tokugawa. In the years before the Tokugawa shogunate, that innovative daimyō from Western Japan had been actively involved in negotiating trade and diplomatic treaties with Spain and with the colonies of New Spain (Mexico) and the Philippines; and it was anticipated that the mere presence of the Princess could serve to underscore the range of possibilities which could be inferred from that little-known history.)
- Norway: Grand Cross with Collar of St. Olav 18 April 1911
- Persian Empire: Order of the Aqdas, 1st Class, 16 May 1902 – During his enthronement festivities.
- Kingdom of Portugal: 315th Grand Cross of the Tower and Sword, 1900
- Kingdom of Romania: Grand Cross of the Order of Carol I, with Collar, 1906
- Russian Empire: Knight of St. Andrew, 1902 – During his enthronement festivities.
- Siam: Knight of the Order of the Royal House of Chakri, 18 October 1897
- Sweden: Knight of the Seraphim, 16 May 1902 – King Oscar II of Sweden sent his youngest son, Prince Eugen to represent him at the festivities marking the King's enthronement, and he invested the King as a Knight in a special ceremony.
- United Kingdom:
  - Honorary Grand Cross of the Royal Victorian Order, 28 July 1897
  - Stranger Knight Companion of the Order of the Garter, 16 May 1902 – King Edward VII's brother, the Duke of Connaught attended the festivities marking the King's enthronement, and invested him as a Knight in a special ceremony.
  - Recipient of the Royal Victorian Chain, 9 June 1905

In the Royal Library of the Royal Palace of Madrid, there are books containing emblems of the Spanish monarch.

=== Military ranks and honorary appointments ===
- Captain general, Spanish Army, 17 May 1902 - 14 April 1931
- Captain general, Spanish Navy, 17 May 1902 - 14 April 1931
- General of the British Army, 1905 - 28 February 1941
- Field Marshal of the British Army, 3 June 1928 - 28 February 1941

== See also ==
- 1902 Copa de la Coronación
- List of covers of Time magazine (1920s), (1930s)

== Bibliography ==
- Avilés Farré, Juan; Elizalde Pérez-Grueso, María Dolores; Sueiro Seoane, Susana (2002). Historia política de España, 1875–1939. Vol. 1. Tres Cantos: Ediciones Istmo. ISBN 84-7090-320-9.
- Barry, John M. (2004). The Great Influenza: The Epic Story of the Greatest Plague in History. Viking Penguin. ISBN 0-670-89473-7.
- Flesler, Daniela; Linhard, Tabea Alexa; Pérez Melgosa, Adrián (2015). Revisiting Jewish Spain in the Modern Era. New York: Routledge. ISBN 978-1-31798-057-5.
- Casals, Xavier (2004). "Miguel Primo de Rivera, el espejo de Franco". Miguel Primo de Rivera y Orbaneja. Madrid: Ediciones B. pp. 123–253. ISBN 84-666-1447-8.
- Churchill, Sir Winston. Great Contemporaries. London: T. Butterworth, 1937. Contains the most famous single account of Alfonso in the English language. The author, writing shortly after the Spanish Civil War began, retained considerable fondness for the ex-sovereign.
- Collier, William Miller. At the Court of His Catholic Majesty. Chicago: McClurg, 1912. The author was American ambassador to Spain from 1905 to 1909.
- Moreno Luzón, Javier (2023). El rey patriota. Alfonso XIII y la nación. Barcelona: Galaxia Gutenberg. ISBN 978-84-19392-11-4.
- Noel, Gerard. Ena: Spain's English Queen. London: Constable, 1984. Considerably more candid than Petrie about Alfonso, the private man, and about the miseries the royal family experienced because of their haemophiliac children.
- Nuttall, Zelia (1906). The earliest historical relations between Mexico and Japan: from original documents preserved in Spain and Japan. The University Press.
- Petrie, Sir Charles. King Alfonso XIII and His Age. London: Chapman & Hall, 1963. Written as it was during Queen Ena's lifetime, this book necessarily omits the King's extramarital affairs; but it remains a useful biography, not least because the author knew Alfonso quite well, interviewed him at considerable length, and relates him to the wider Spanish intellectual culture of his time.
- Pilapil, Vicente R. Alfonso XIII. Twayne's rulers and statesmen of the world series 12. New York: Twayne, 1969.
- Sencourt, Robert. King Alfonso: A Biography. London: Faber, 1942.
- Tuñón de Lara, Manuel (2000) [1967]. La España del siglo XX. Vol. 1. La quiebra de una forma de Estado (1898–1931). Tres Cantos: Ediciones Akal. ISBN 84-460-1491-2.

Alfonso XIII House of Bourbon Cadet branch of the Capetian dynasty Born: 17 May 1886 Died: 28 February 1941
Regnal titles
Vacant Title last held by Alfonso XII	King of Spain; 17 May 1886 – 14 April 1931	Vacant Second Spanish Republic Title next held by Juan Carlos I
Titles in pretence
Loss of title	— TITULAR — King of Spain; 14 April 1931 – 15 January 1941	Succeeded by Infante Juan, Count of Barcelona
Preceded by Infante Alfonso Carlos, Duke of San Jaime	— TITULAR — King of France and Navarre; Legitimist succession 29 September 1936 – 28 February 1941	Succeeded by Infante Jaime, Duke of Segovia
Awards and achievements
Preceded by Dwight F. Davis	Cover of Time magazine 22 December 1924	Succeeded by Charles Evans Hughes
