= Caritas Madagascar =

Malagasy Catholic charity and relief organisation

- Established: 1959
- Type: Nonprofit
- Purpose: social work, development aid, humanitarian aid
- Headquarters: Lot IV G, 199 Antanimena
- Location: Antananarivo 101, Madagascar
- Origins: Catholic Social Teaching
- Region served: Madagascar
- Affiliations: Caritas Africa, Caritas Internationalis
- Website: caritasmadagascar.org

Caritas Madagascar is a Catholic development and relief agency in Madagascar, established 1959. It is a member of the global Caritas Internationalis confederation, as well as of Caritas Africa.

== History ==
In 1947, one year after its own creation, the French Secours catholique opened an antenna in what was then French Madagascar. A year after the declaration of the Malagasy Republic, in 1959, the country was affected by large-scale floods after which the antenna of Secours catholique became Vonjy Aina Katolika, the organisation currently known as Caritas Madagascar.

In 1970, the Episcopal Conference of Madagascar founded another structure, the Bureau de liaison pour les actions sociales et caritatives ("Liaison Office for Social and Charitable Actions"; BLASC) to be in charge of development programmes. However, it merged with Caritas in 1977. The organisation was restructured several times and registered as an NGO in 2014.

== Structure ==
Caritas Madagascar has a presence in the entire country through its local structures. A national office based in the capital of Antananarivo is coordinating and supporting a network of 22 diocesan Caritas structures, which in turn coordinate the work of multiple parish Caritas organisations.

The diocesan Caritas organisations are:

- Ecclesiastical region Centre:
  - Diocesan Caritas of Antananarivo
  - Diocesan Caritas of Antsirabe
  - Diocesan Caritas of Miarinarivo
  - Diocesan Caritas of Tsiroanomandidy
  - Diocesan Caritas of Maintirano
- Ecclesiastical region North:
  - Diocesan Caritas of Antsiranana
  - Diocesan Caritas of Ambanja
  - Diocesan Caritas of Mahajanga
  - Diocesan Caritas of Port-Bergé
- Ecclesiastical region East:
  - Diocesan Caritas of Ambatondrazaka
  - Diocesan Caritas of Fenoarivo-Atsinanana
  - Diocesan Caritas of Moramanga
  - Diocesan Caritas of Toamasina
- Ecclesiastical region South-West:
  - Diocesan Caritas of Toliara
  - Diocesan Caritas of Morombe
  - Diocesan Caritas of Morondava
  - Diocesan Caritas of Tolagnaro
- Ecclesiastical region South-East:
  - Diocesan Caritas of Ambositra
  - Diocesan Caritas of Farafangana
  - Diocesan Caritas of Mananjary
  - Diocesan Caritas of Ihosy
  - Diocesan Caritas of Fianarantsoa

== Work ==
Some of the main areas in which Caritas Madagascar are active is agricultural development and production, healthcare and WASH. In addition to these development programmes, the organisation also implements basic social welfare activities, by for example providing food supplies to those most in need, and acts as relief actor after natural disasters such as cyclones, floods, or droughts, providing humanitarian aid and post-emergency rehabilitation.

To implement this work, Caritas Madagascar collaborates with different national ministries, as well as with a range of international partners, including the World Bank, the Swiss Agency for Development and Cooperation, and multiple NGO partners.

The national office of Caritas Madagascar is also involved in advocacy activities towards local and national authorities.
