= List of Catholic dioceses in Madagascar =

The Roman Catholic Church in East Africa's major Indian Ocean island state Madagascar comprises only a Latin hierarchy, which is composed of five ecclesiastical provinces, whose Metropolitan Archbisdhoprics have a total of seventeen suffragan dioceses.

There is no Eastern Catholic, pre-diocesan or other exempt jurisdiction.

There is also an Apostolic Nunciature to Madagascar as papal diplomatic representation (embassy-level), in national capital Antananarivo.

There are no titular sees.

All defunct jurisdictions have current successor sees.

== Current Latin dioceses ==
=== Episcopal Conference of Madagascar ===
==== Ecclesiastical Province of Antananarivo ====
- Metropolitan Archdiocese of Antananarivo
  - Diocese of Antsirabe
  - Diocese of Maintirano
  - Diocese of Miarinarivo
  - Diocese of Tsiroanomandidy

==== Ecclesiastical Province of Antsiranana ====
- Metropolitan Archdiocese of Antsiranana
  - Diocese of Ambanja
  - Diocese of Mahajanga
  - Diocese of Port-Bergé

==== Ecclesiastical Province of Fianarantsoa ====
- Metropolitan Archdiocese of Fianarantsoa
  - Diocese of Ambositra
  - Diocese of Farafangana
  - Diocese of Ihosy
  - Diocese of Mananjary

==== Ecclesiastical Province of Toamasina ====
- Metropolitan Archdiocese of Toamasina
  - Diocese of Ambatondrazaka
  - Diocese of Fenoarivo Atsinanana
  - Diocese of Moramanga

==== Ecclesiastical Province of Toliara ====
- Metropolitan Archdiocese of Toliara
  - Diocese of Morombe
  - Diocese of Morondava
  - Diocese of Tôlagnaro.

== See also ==
- List of Catholic dioceses (structured view)
- List of Roman Catholic dioceses in Indian Ocean Episcopal Conference (Comoros, Mauritius, LaRéunion, Seychelles)

== Sources and external links ==
- GCatholic.org - data for all sections
- Catholic-Hierarchy entry.
