= Episcopal Conference of Madagascar =

Assembly of Catholic bishops

- Abbreviation: CEM
- Formation: 1965
- Type: NGO
- Legal status: Civil nonprofit
- Purpose: To support the ministry of bishops
- Headquarters: Antananarivo
- Region served: Madagascar
- Members: Active and retired Catholic bishops of Madagascar
- President: Désiré Tsarahazana
- Main organ: Conference

The Episcopal Conference of Madagascar (CEM) (French: Conférence Episcopale de Madagascar) is the episcopal conference of the Catholic Church in Madagascar. Founded in 1965, it is composed of all active and retired members of the Catholic hierarchy (i.e., diocesan, coadjutor, and auxiliary bishops) in Madagascar.

The CEM is a registered corporation based in Antananarivo. The current president is the Archbishop of Toliara, Désiré Tsarahazana. The current vice president is Marie Fabien Raharilamboniaina, OCD, the Bishop of Morondava. The current secretary-general is Jean Claude Randrianarisoa, the Bishop of Miarinarivo.

== History ==
The Episcopal Conference of Madagascar was founded in 1965, five years after the country's independence.

In November 2016, members of the conference published a letter criticizing Madagascar's political elite and intelligentsia. The letter declared that the country "suffers from a shortage of wise men."

== Presidents ==
This is a list of the presidents of the Episcopal Conference of Madagascar:

1. Archbishop Jérôme Rakotomalala (1965–1966)
2. Archbishop Gilbert Ramanantoanina, SJ (1966–1971)
3. Archbishop Albert Joseph Tsiahoana (1971–1974)
4. Cardinal Victor Razafimahatratra, SJ (1974–1986)
5. Archbishop Albert Joseph Tsiahoana (1986–1992)
6. Bishop Jean-Guy Rakodondravahatra, MS(1992–1996)
7. Cardinal Armand Razafindratandra (1996–2002)
8. Archbishop Fulgence Rabeony, SJ (2002–2006)
9. Archbishop Fulgence Rabemahafaly (2006 – November 2012)
10. Archbishop Désiré Tsarahazana (November 2012 – )

== See also ==
- Catholic Church in Madagascar
