= Rakotomalala =

Rakotomalala is a common Malagasy last name. Malagasy are citizens of Madagascar, the largest island in the Indian Ocean. Rakoto is a common root for many Malagasy last names. Malala means "beloved". The name is so common that it is shared by a former prime minister, a UN representative and a singer who are not related. There are Rakotomalala present in 14 different countries, which is a large number for a total Malagasy population of only 15 million people.

== People ==
- Andriantsilavo Frédéric Rakotomalala, Malagasy politician
- François Emile Rakotomalala, Malagasy politician
- Jean-Jacques Rakotomalala (born 1965), Malagasy judoka
- Jérôme Rakotomalala (1914-1975), Archbishop of Antananarivo
- Joël Rakotomalala (1929-1976), Malagasy politician
