= Raymond Razakarinvony =

Malagasy Roman Catholic bishop (1927–2026)

The Most Reverend Raymond Razakarinvony
- Bishop Emeritus of Miarinarivo
- Church: Catholic Church
- Archdiocese: Antananarivo
- Diocese: Miarinarivo
- Appointed: 14 February 1998
- Term ended: 15 February 2007
- Predecessor: Armand Toasy
- Successor: Jean Claude Randrianarisoa

Orders
- Ordination: 27 July 1956
- Consecration: 17 May 1998 by Armand Razafindratandra, Bernard Charles Ratsimamotoana and Albert Joseph Tsiahoana

Personal details
- Born: 19 November 1927 Antananarivo, French Madagascar
- Died: 13 July 2026 (aged 98) Madagascar

Raymond Razakarinvony (19 November 1927 – 13 July 2026) was a Malagasy Roman Catholic prelate who served as the bishop of the Diocese of Miarinarivo from 1998 to 2007.

== Early life and priesthood ==
Raymond Razakarinvony was born in Antananarivo, French Madagascar on 19 November 1927. He was ordained to the priesthood on 27 July 1956 and incardinated in the Archdiocese of Antananarivo, and later served as a vicar general of this Archdiocese until 1998.

== Episcopate ==
On 14 February 1998, Pope John Paul II appointed Razakarinvony as bishop of the Diocese of Miarinarivo.

Razakarinvony received episcopal consecration on 17 May 1998. The principal consecrator was Cardinal Armand Razafindratandra, then Archbishop of Antananarivo.

The Diocese of Miarinarivo is a suffragan diocese of the Archdiocese of Antananarivo and forms part of the ecclesiastical province of Antananarivo.

== Retirement and death ==
Razakarinvony resigned from the pastoral governance of the Diocese of Miarinarivo on 15 February 2007, in accordance with canon law governing the retirement of diocesan bishops. He was succeeded by Jean Claude Randrianarisoa.

Razakarinvony died in Madagascar on 13 July 2026, at the age of 98.

== See also ==
- Catholic Church in Madagascar

Catholic Church titles
Preceded by Armand Toasy	Bishop of Miarinarivo; 1998–2007	Succeeded by Jean Claude Randrianarisoa
