= Ferdinand Botsy =

Malagasy Roman Catholic bishop (1940–2025)

His Excellency Ferdinand Botsy
- Bishop Emeritus of Ambanja
- Archdiocese: Antsiranana
- Diocese: Ambanja
- Appointed: 8 July 1976
- Term ended: 25 October 1997
- Predecessor: Léon-Adolphe Messmer
- Successor: Odon Razanakolona

Orders
- Ordination: 9 March 1969
- Consecration: 3 October 1976 by Victor Razafimahatratra

Personal details
- Born: 13 June 1940 Hell-Ville, Nosy Be, French Madagascar
- Died: 30 April 2025 (aged 84) Genoa, Italy

Ferdinand Botsy (13 June 1940 – 30 April 2025) was a Malagasy prelate of the Roman Catholic Church.

== Biography ==
Botsy was born in Hell-Ville (now Andoany) on the island of Nosy Be, Madagascar. A member of the Order of Friars Minor Capuchin, he was ordained to the priesthood in March 1969. He was appointed bishop of Ambanja in 1976, serving until his resignation in October 1997.

Botsy died in Genoa, Italy on 30 April 2025, at the age of 84.

Catholic Church titles
| Preceded by Léon-Adolphe Messmer | Bishop of Ambanja; 1976–1997 | Succeeded by Odon Razanakolona |
