= Jean-Samuel Raobelina =

Roman Catholic bishop

Jean-Samuel Raobelina MS
- Bishop of Tsiroanomandidy
- Church: Catholic Church
- Diocese: Diocese of Tsiroanomandidy
- In office: 27 April 1978 – 30 June 2001
- Predecessor: Ángel Martínez Vivas
- Successor: Gustavo Bombín Espino

Orders
- Ordination: 21 March 1959
- Consecration: 9 July 1978 by Victor Razafimahatratra

Personal details
- Born: 27 June 1928 Ambositra, Fianarantsoa Province, Colony of Madagascar and Dependencies, French Empire
- Died: 30 June 2001 (aged 73)

Jean-Samuel Raobelina, MS (27 June 1928 – 30 June 2001) was the Roman Catholic Bishop of Tsiroanomandidy.

== Life ==
Jean-Samuel Raobelina entered the Congregation of Missionaries of Our Lady of La Salette and was ordained a priest on 21 March 1959.

Pope Paul VI appointed him Bishop of Quilmes on 27 April 1978. The Archbishop of Antananarivo, Victor Cardinal Razafimahatratra, SJ, ordained him bishop on 9 July of the same year; Co-consecrators were Jean-Guy Rakodondravahatra MS, Bishop of Ihosy, and Francesco Vòllaro OSST, Bishop of Ambatondrazaka.
