= Gaetano Di Pierro =

Italian Roman Catholic bishop (born 1948)

Gaetano Di Pierro SCI
- Bishop Emeritus of Farafangana
- Church: Catholic Church
- Diocese: Roman Catholic Diocese of Farafangana
- In office: 3 March 2018 – 31 October 2024
- Predecessor: Benjamin Marc Ramaroson
- Successor: Marcellin Randriamamonjy
- Other post: Apostolic Administrator of Farafangana (2024-2025)
- Previous posts: Apostolic Administrator of Moramanga (2018-2019); Bishop of Moramanga (2006-2018); Titular Bishop of Guardialfiera (2001-2006); Auxiliary Bishop of Ambatondrazaka (2001-2006)

Orders
- Ordination: 29 June 1975
- Consecration: 5 August 2001 by Antoine Scopelliti

Personal details
- Born: 1 December 1948 (age 77) Orta Nova, Apulia, Italy

Gaetano Di Pierro (born 1 December 1948, in Orta Nova) is an Italian clergyman and prelate for the Roman Catholic Diocese of Farafangana. He was appointed bishop in 2018.

== See also ==
- Catholic Church in Madagascar
