= Désiré Tsarahazana =

Malagasy prelate of the Catholic Church (born 1954)

His Eminence Désiré Tsarahazana
- Archbishop of Toamasina
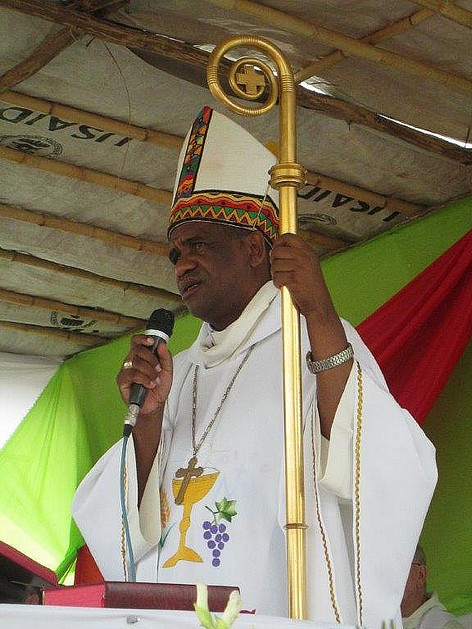
- Cardinal Tsarahazana in June 2018.
- Church: Catholic
- Archdiocese: Toamasina
- See: Toamasina
- Appointed: 24 November 2008
- Predecessor: René Joseph Rakotondrabé
- Other posts: President of the Episcopal Conference of Madagascar (2012–); Cardinal-Priest of San Gregorio Barbarigo alle Tre Fontane (2018–)
- Previous posts: Bishop of Fenoarivo Atsinanana (2000–08); Apostolic Administrator of Fenoarivo Atsinanana (2008–09)

Orders
- Ordination: 28 September 1986
- Consecration: 18 February 2001 by Michel Malo
- Created cardinal: 28 June 2018 by Pope Francis
- Rank: Cardinal-Priest

Personal details
- Born: Désiré Tsarahazana; 13 June 1954 (age 71) Amboangibe, Madagascar
- Motto: Vince in bono malum; (Overcome evil with good)
- Coat of arms

Désiré Tsarahazana (born 13 June 1954) is a Malagasy prelate of the Catholic Church. He has been Archbishop of Toamasina since 2010 but served in that see prior to its elevation since 2008. Pope Francis appointed him a cardinal in 2018.

== Biography ==
Désiré Tsarahazana was born on 13 June 1954 in Amboangibe in the Sava Region of Madagascar. He studied at the minor seminary in Mahajanga from 1970 to 1976 and then continued his studies at Antsiranana ou Diego-Suarez until 1978, and then prepared for the priesthood from 1979 to 1982 and studied philosophy and theology from 1983 to 1986.

He was ordained a priest on 28 September 1986.

Pope John Paul II appointed him Bishop of Fenoarivo Atsinanana on 30 October 2000. He was consecrated a bishop on 18 February 2001. He chose as his episcopal motto "Sois vainqueur du mal par le bien" ("Conquer evil with good").

Pope Benedict XVI named him Bishop of Toamasina on 24 November 2008. He became its archbishop when the diocese was raised to the status of archdiocese on 26 February 2010.

He was vice-president of the Episcopal Conference of Madagascar from 2006 to 2012 and since November 2012 he has been its president. That Conference elected him to participate in the 2015 Synod of Bishops on the Family. In February 2018 he took part in a Vatican conference on "Tackling violence committed in the name of religion".

Since 2012 he has led a campaign to establish a national pilgrimage site in Andevoranto dedicated to Henri de Solages (1786–1832), who is considered the father of Catholicism in Madagascar. A stone church he had constructed was dedicated on 7 December 2014 by the papal nuncio.

In 2013, he denied that employees of Catholic Relief Services (CRS) were promoting contraception in Madagascar as the human overpopulation think tank Population Research Institute charged. He said the reports were based on confusion between government health care workers, whom CRD trains in children's health and malaria prevention, with CRS employees.

Pope Francis made Tsarahazana a cardinal on 28 June 2018, assigning him the titular church of San Gregorio Barbarigo alle Tre Fontane. He was a cardinal elector in the 2025 papal conclave, which elected Robert Prevost as Pope Leo XIV.

In a 2022 interview with Aid to the Church in Need, the archbishop described the state of the Catholic Church in Madagascar as healthy, but in need of a deepening of the faith. "There are many Christians. Most of the dioceses are seeing an increase in the Christian faith, and churches are full. However, I should also mention that ours is a country of great contrasts. We have many resources, but the country is deteriorating. And so, we have to ask ourselves if we are really Christians, if we are living as Jesus taught us, in service to others. This contrast, this difference, worries me. There are Christians, but we need to go deeper in the faith. The faith has to be really lived, and not just practiced outwardly. If we live as Jesus teaches, then we can develop better."

== See also ==
- Cardinals created by Francis
- Catholic Church in Madagascar

Catholic Church titles
New title Diocese established	Bishop of Fenoarivo Atsinanana; 30 October 2000 – 24 November 2008	Succeeded by Marcellin Randriamamonjy
Preceded by René Joseph Rakotondrabé	Bishop of Toamasina; 24 November 2008 – 26 February 2010	Diocese promoted
Diocese promoted	Archbishop of Toamasina; 26 February 2010 – present	Incumbent
Preceded by Bernard Panafieu	Cardinal-Priest of San Gregorio Barbarigo alle Tre Fontane; 28 June 2018 – present	Incumbent
