= Joseph Ignace Randrianasolo =

- Bishop of Mahajanga
- Church: Catholic Church
- Diocese: Diocese of Mahajanga
- In office: 3 June 1999 – 2 February 2010
- Predecessor: Michel Malo
- Successor: Roger Victor Rakotondrajao
- Previous posts: Titular Bishop of Milevum (1997-1999); Auxiliary Bishop of Antananarivo (1997-1999)

Orders
- Ordination: 20 December 1975
- Consecration: 8 February 1998 by Armand Razafindratandra

Personal details
- Born: 31 July 1947 Nandihizana, Antananarivo Province, French Madagascar, French Union, French Empire
- Died: 4 February 2010 (aged 62)

Joseph Ignace Randrianasolo (31 July 1947 – 4 February 2010) was the Roman Catholic bishop of the Roman Catholic Diocese of Mahajanga, Madagascar.

Ordained to the priesthood on 20 December 1975, Randrianasolo earned a doctorate in canon law from the Pontifical Urban University in Rome in 1995, and was named auxiliary bishop of the Roman Catholic Archdiocese of Antananarivo on 20 October 1996 and was ordained on 4 February 1997. On 3 June 1999, Bishop Randrianasolo was named bishop of the Mahajanga Diocese and he resigned on 2 February 2010, two days before his death.

== Notes ==
Joseph Ignace Randrianasolo (Madagascar priest, 1947–2010), Les droits de l'enfant dans le Code de droit canonique, (Urbanianum diss. 123, 1995) iv-107 pp (part).
