= Diocese of Toamasina =

Diocese (or Bishopric) of Toamasina may refer to:

- the present Anglican Diocese of Toamasina
- the precursor of the Roman Catholic Archdiocese of Toamasina, which was called the Diocese of Toamasina
