= Charles-Remy Rakotonirina =

Catholic bishop

Charles-Remy Rakotonirina S.J.
- Bishop of Farafangana
- Church: Catholic Church
- Diocese: Diocese of Farafangana
- In office: 28 October 1976 – 6 August 2005
- Predecessor: Victor Razafimahatratra
- Successor: Benjamin Marc Ramaroson

Orders
- Ordination: 6 September 1961
- Consecration: 27 March 1977 by Victor Razafimahatratra

Personal details
- Born: 16 January 1928 Fianarantsoa, Colony of Madagascar and Dependencies, French Empire
- Died: 6 August 2005 (aged 77)

Charles-Remy Rakotonirina (born 1928 in Fianarantsoa) was a Malagasy clergyman and prelate for the Roman Catholic Diocese of Farafangana. He was appointed bishop in 1976. He died in 2005.
