= Diocese of Antsiranana =

Diocese (or Bishopric) of Antsiranana may refer to:

- the present Anglican Diocese of Antsiranana
- the precursor of the Roman Catholic Archdiocese of Antsiranana, which was called the Diocese of Diégo-Suarez
