= Diocese of Mahajanga =

Diocese (or Bishopric) of Mahajanga may refer to:

- the Anglican Diocese of Mahajanga
- the Roman Catholic Diocese of Mahajanga
