= Scopelliti =

Scopelliti is an Italian surname from Agrigento, Messina and Reggio Calabria, originating from various place names possibly derived from Greek skópelos (σκόπελος) 'reef rock; promontory; lookout, watchtower'. Notable people with the surname include:

- Antoine Scopelliti (1939–2023), Italian Roman Catholic prelate
- Antonino Scopelliti (1935–1991), Italian magistrate and Mafia victim
- Domenico Scopelliti, Italian-Canadian mobster and convicted murderer
- Giuseppe Scopelliti (born 1966), Italian politician
- Veronica Scopelliti (born 1982), known as Noemi, Italian singer-songwriter

== See also ==
- Scopelli
- Scopello (disambiguation)
- Skopelitis
