= Diocese of Morondava =

Roman Catholic diocese in Madagascar

Coordinates: 20°17′45″S 44°17′43″E

Diocese of Morondava Dioecesis Morondavensis

Location
- Country: Madagascar
- Metropolitan: Toliara

Statistics
- Area: 46,620 km^{2} (18,000 sq mi)
- Population: Total; Catholics: (as of 2004); 460,200; 41,620 (9.0%)

Information
- Rite: Latin Rite

Current leadership
- Pope: Leo XIV
- Bishop: Marie Fabien Raharilamboniaina, OCD

The Roman Catholic Diocese of Morondava (Latin: Morondaven(sis)) is a suffragan Latin diocese in the ecclesiastical province of Toliara (one of five in Madagascar), yet depends on the missionary Roman Congregation for the Evangelization of Peoples.

Its cathedral episcopal see is the (Marian) Cathédrale Maria Manjaka Namahora, in the city of Morondava, Toliara province.

== Statistics ==
As per 2014, it pastorally served 54,895 Catholics (9.8% of 560,000 total) on 45,200 km^{2} in 17 parishes and 26 missions with 42 priests (8 diocesan, 34 religious), 156 lay religious (39 brothers, 117 sisters) and 20 seminarians.

== History ==
- Established on January 8, 1938 as Apostolic Prefecture of Morondava, on territories split off from the then Apostolic Vicariate of Fianarantsoa, Apostolic Vicariate of Majunga and Apostolic Vicariate of Tananarive
- On 1939.03.15 it gained territory from Mission sui juris of Miarinarivo.
- Promoted on September 14, 1955 as Diocese of Morondava
- Lost territories, twice : on 1960.04.25 to establish the Diocese of Morombe and on 2017.02.08 (with two other sees) to establish Diocese of Maintirano.

== Ordinaries ==
(all Roman rite, so far -mostly European missionary- members of Latin congregations)

Apostolic Prefects of Morondava

- Father Joseph-Paul Futy, MS (born France) (1938 – 1947.02.13); later Titular Bishop of Aspendus (1947.02.13 – death 1956.08.12) as Apostolic Vicar of Antsirabe (Madagascar) (1947.02.13 – retired 1955.03)
- Father Stefano Garon, MS (1947.07.04 – death 1954)
- Father Paul J. Girouard, MS (born USA) (1954 – 1955.09.14 see below).

Suffragan Bishops of Morondava

- Paul J. Girouard, MS (see above 1955.09.14 – death 1964.02.18)
- Bernard Charles Ratsimamotoana, MS (1964.09.29 – retired 1998.08.08), died 2005
- Donald Joseph Leo Pelletier, MS (born USA) (1999.10.15 - retired 2010.02.26)
- Marie Fabien Raharilamboniaina, OCD (2010.02.26 - ...), also Vice-President of Episcopal Conference of Madagascar (2012? – ...).

== See also ==
- List of Roman Catholic dioceses in Madagascar
- Roman Catholicism in Madagascar

== Sources and external links ==
- GCatholic.org
- Catholic Hierarchy
