= Panafieu =

Panafieu is a French surname. Notable people with the surname include:

- André de Panafieu (fl. 1920s), French ambassador
- Bernard Panafieu (1931–2017), French Roman Catholic bishop
- Françoise de Panafieu (born 1948), French politician
