= Jean-Jacques Razafindranazy =

French doctor (1952–2020)

- Born: 9 November 1952; Amboangibe, Madagascar
- Died: 21 March 2020 (aged 67); Lille, France
- Cause of death: COVID-19
- Occupation: Doctor

Jean-Jacques Razafindranazy (9 November 1952 – 21 March 2020) was a Madagascar-born medical doctor. He was known for his work as a doctor during the COVID-19 pandemic, during which he died of COVID-19.

== Biography ==
Born in Madagascar in 1952, Razafindranazy lived in Soissons with his wife, who also worked as a doctor specializing in pediatrics. He was immediately called to action for the outbreak of COVID-19 while returning from a vacation to Madagascar, a time during which his children described him as "in good shape". However, a shortage of face masks and the stresses of working in healthcare during this time led to him catching the virus. He was immediately transferred to the CHU hospital in Lille, where he died on 21 March 2020.

The French Minister of Social Affairs and Health, Olivier Véran, announced Razafindranazy's death on RTL on 22 March 2020, as did Patrick Pelloux, President of the Association des médecins urgentistes de France, on BFM TV. Razafindranazy's death was the first among French health professionals, and it caused a greater stress on the importance of wearing FFP2 masks while treating patients infected with the coronavirus.
