= Phatanus =

Former Roman city and modern titular see in Egypt

Phatanus was a city and episcopal see in Roman Egypt, which remains a Latin Church titular see. The titular see has also been held by one Coptic Catholic auxiliary eparch.

== History ==
The city, near modern El-Batanu or El-Batnu, was important enough in the Late Roman province of Aegyptus Primus to become one of the suffragans of the Metropolitan of the capital, none other than the original Patriarchate of Alexandria. Later it faded.

== Titular see ==
The diocese was nominally restored Latin Church titular see of the episcopal (lowest) rank under the name of Phatanus (Latine), Phatanen(sis) (Latin adjective) or Fatano (Curiate Italian).

It is vacant since decades, having had only two incumbents, so far of the fitting episcopal rank, including one Eastern Catholic :

- Jean Wolff, Holy Ghost Fathers (C.S.Sp.) (July 8, 1941 – September 14, 1955), first as Apostolic Vicar of Majunga (Madagascar) (July 8, 1941 – February 13, 1947), then as Vicar Apostolic of Diégo-Suarez (Madagascar) (February 13, 1947 – September 14, 1955); later succeeded as last suffragan Bishop of Diégo-Suarez (Madagascar) (September 14, 1955 – December 11, 1958), promoted with his see first Metropolitan Archbishop of Diégo-Suarez (December 11, 1958 – April 13, 1967), emeritate as Titular Archbishop of Gummi in Byzacena (April 13, 1967 – May 24, 1971)
- Youhanna Nueir, Friars Minor (O.F.M.) (December 8, 1955 – March 26, 1965) as Auxiliary Bishop of Luqsor of the Copts (Egypt) (1955.12.08 – 1965.03.26), Eparch (Bishop) of Assiut of the Copts (once Lycopolis, Egypt) (March 26, 1965 – retired March 20, 1990)

== Sources ==
- GCatholic
