= Bishop of Antananarivo =

Bishop of Antananarivo can refer to

- the Anglican Bishop of Antananarivo, see Church of the Province of the Indian Ocean#Diocese of Antananarivo
- the Archbishop of the Roman Catholic Archdiocese of Antananarivo
