= Skopelitis =

Skopelitis (Σκοπελίτης), feminine Skopeliti (Σκοπελίτη) or Skopelitou (Σκοπελίτου), is a Greek surname. Notable people with the surname include:

- Filippos Skopelitis (born 1994), Greek footballer
- Giannis Skopelitis (born 1978), Greek footballer
- Nicky Skopelitis (born 1960), American guitarist and composer

== See also ==
- Scopelliti
- Skopelos
