= Archdiocese of Toamasina =

Roman Catholic archdiocese in Madagascar

Coordinates: 18.1582°S 49.4117°E

Archdiocese of Taomasina Archidioecesis Toamasinensis

Location
- Country: Madagascar
- Metropolitan: Roman Catholic Archdiocese of Toamasina

Statistics
- Area: 23,690 km^{2} (9,150 sq mi)
- Population: Total; Catholics: (as of 2004); 1,800,000; 600,000 (33.3%)

Information
- Rite: Latin Rite

Current leadership
- Pope: Leo XIV
- Metropolitan Archbishop: Désiré Tsarahazana

The Roman Catholic Archdiocese of Toamasina (Latin: Toamasinen(sis)) is one of five Latin Metropolitan archdioceses on Madagascar, yet depends on the missionary Roman Congregation for the Evangelization of Peoples.

Its cathedral archiepiscopal see is the Cathédrale Saint Joseph, dedicated to Saint Joseph in the city of Toamasina. It was elevated to the rank of Metropolitan Archdiocese by Pope Benedict XVI on Friday, February 26, 2010.

== Statistics ==
As per 2014, it pastorally served 620,022 Catholics (31.1% of 1,992,866 total) on 23,690 km^{2} in 21 parishes with 59 priests (22 diocesan, 37 religious), 185 lay religious (82 brothers, 103 sisters) and 19 seminarians.

== Ecclesiastical Province ==
Toamasina has as suffragan sees:

- Roman Catholic Diocese of Ambatondrazaka
- Roman Catholic Diocese of Fenoarivo Atsinanana
- Roman Catholic Diocese of Moramanga.

== History ==
- Established on June 18, 1935 as Apostolic Prefecture of Vatomandry, on territories split off from the then Apostolic Vicariate of Fianarantsoa and Apostolic Vicariate of Tananarive
- Promoted on May 25, 1939 and renamed after its new see as Apostolic Vicariate of Tamatave.
- Promoted on September 14, 1955 as Diocese of Tamatave
- On 1968.04.09 it lost territory to establish the Diocese of Mananjary
- Renamed on January 31, 1990 like its see as Diocese of Toamasina
- Promoted on February 26, 2010 as Metropolitan Archdiocese of Toamasina

== Ordinaries ==
(all Roman rite)

Apostolic Prefect of Vatomandry

- Father Alain-Sébastien Le Breton, Montfort Missionaries (S.M.M.) (born France) (1935 – 1939.05.25 see below)

Apostolic Vicar of Tamatave

- Alain-Sébastien Le Breton, S.M.M. (see above 1939.05.25 – 1955.09.14 see below), Titular Bishop of Hypselis (1939.05.25 – 1955.09.14)

Suffragan Bishops of Tamatave

- Alain-Sébastien Le Breton, S.M.M. (see above 1955.09.14 – retired 1957.03.15); emeritate as Titular Bishop of Salona (1957.03.15 – death 1964.12.16)
- Jules-Joseph Puset, Sulpicians (P.S.S.) (born France) (1957.11.14 – retired 1972.03.25), died 1983
- Jérôme Razafindrazaka (1972.03.25 – retired 1989.05.15), died 1992
- René Joseph Rakotondrabé (1989.05.15 – 1990.01.31 see below); previously Titular Bishop of Umbriatico (1972.03.25 – 1974.02.28) as Auxiliary Bishop of Tuléar (Madagascar) (1972.03.25 – 1974.02.28), succeeding as Bishop of Tuléar (1974.02.28 – 1989.05.15)

Suffragan Bishops of Toamasina

- René Joseph Rakotondrabé (see above 1989.05.15 - retired 2008.11.24), died 2012
- Desire Tsarahazana (2008.11.24 - 2010.02.26 see below); previously Bishop of Fenoarivo Atsinanana (Madagascar) (2000.10.30 – 2008.11.24), remaining a while Apostolic Administrator of Fenoarivo Atsinanana (2008.12 – 2009.02.10); future Cardinal

Metropolitan Archbishops of Toamasina

- Desire Tsarahazana (see above 2010.02.26 - ...), also President of Episcopal Conference of Madagascar (2012.11 – ...); Cardinal in 2018

== See also ==
- List of Roman Catholic dioceses in Madagascar
- Roman Catholicism in Madagascar

== Sources and external links ==
- GCatholic.org
- Catholic Hierarchy
