= Diocese of Maintirano =

Roman Catholic diocese in Madagascar

Diocese of Maintirano Dioecesis Maintiranensis Diôsezin' i Maintirano

Location
- Country: Madagascar
- Metropolitan: Archdiocese of Antananarivo
- Headquarters: Maintirano, Melaky, Madagascar

Statistics
- Area: 38,852 km^{2} (15,001 sq mi)
- Population: Total; Catholics: (as of 2023); 462,300; 36,120 (7.8%)
- Parishes: 1

Information
- Denomination: Catholic Church
- Sui iuris church: Latin Church
- Rite: Roman Rite
- Established: 8 February 2017; 9 years ago
- Cathedral: Cathédrale de l’Assomption in Maintirano
- Secular priests: 16

Current leadership
- Pope: Leo XIV
- Bishop: Clément Hérizo Rakotoasimbola, M.S.
- Metropolitan Archbishop: Jean de Dieu Raoelison

The Roman Catholic Diocese of Maintirano is a Latin Catholic suffragan diocese in the ecclesiastical province of the Metropolitan Roman Catholic Archdiocese of Antananarivo (national capital), one of five on Madagascar), yet it remains in the jurisdiction of the missionary Roman Congregation for the Evangelization of Peoples.

Its cathedral episcopal see is the Cathédrale de l’Assomption, dedicated to the Assumption of Mary, in Maintirano, Mahajanga Province.

== History ==
Established on 8 February 2017, as the Diocese of Maintirano, on canonical territories split off from Diocese of Tsiroanomandidy (also in the Ecclesiastical province of Antananarivo), the Roman Catholic Diocese of Mahajanga (Ecclesiastical Province of Antsiranana) and the Diocese of Morondava (Ecclesiastical Province of Toliara).

== Episcopal Ordinaries ==
(Roman Rite; so far missionary European members of a Latin congregation)

Suffragan Bishops of Maintirano

- Gustavo Bombin Espino, O.SS.T. (8 February 2017 – 22 July 2023), appointed Archbishop of Toliara
  - Apostolic Administrator Zygmunt Robaszkiewicz, M.S.F. (1 October 2023 – 14 July 2024)
- Clément Hérizo Rakotoasimbola, M.S. (2 May 2024 – Present)

== See also ==
- List of Catholic dioceses in Madagascar
- Catholic Church in Madagascar

== Sources and external links ==
- GCatholic, with Google satellite photo
