= San Gregorio Barbarigo alle Tre Fontane =

Church in Rome

St. Gregory Barbarigo at Tre Fontane
- San Gregorio Barbarigo alle Tre Fontane (in Italian); S. Gregorii Barbadici ad Aquas Salvias (in Latin)
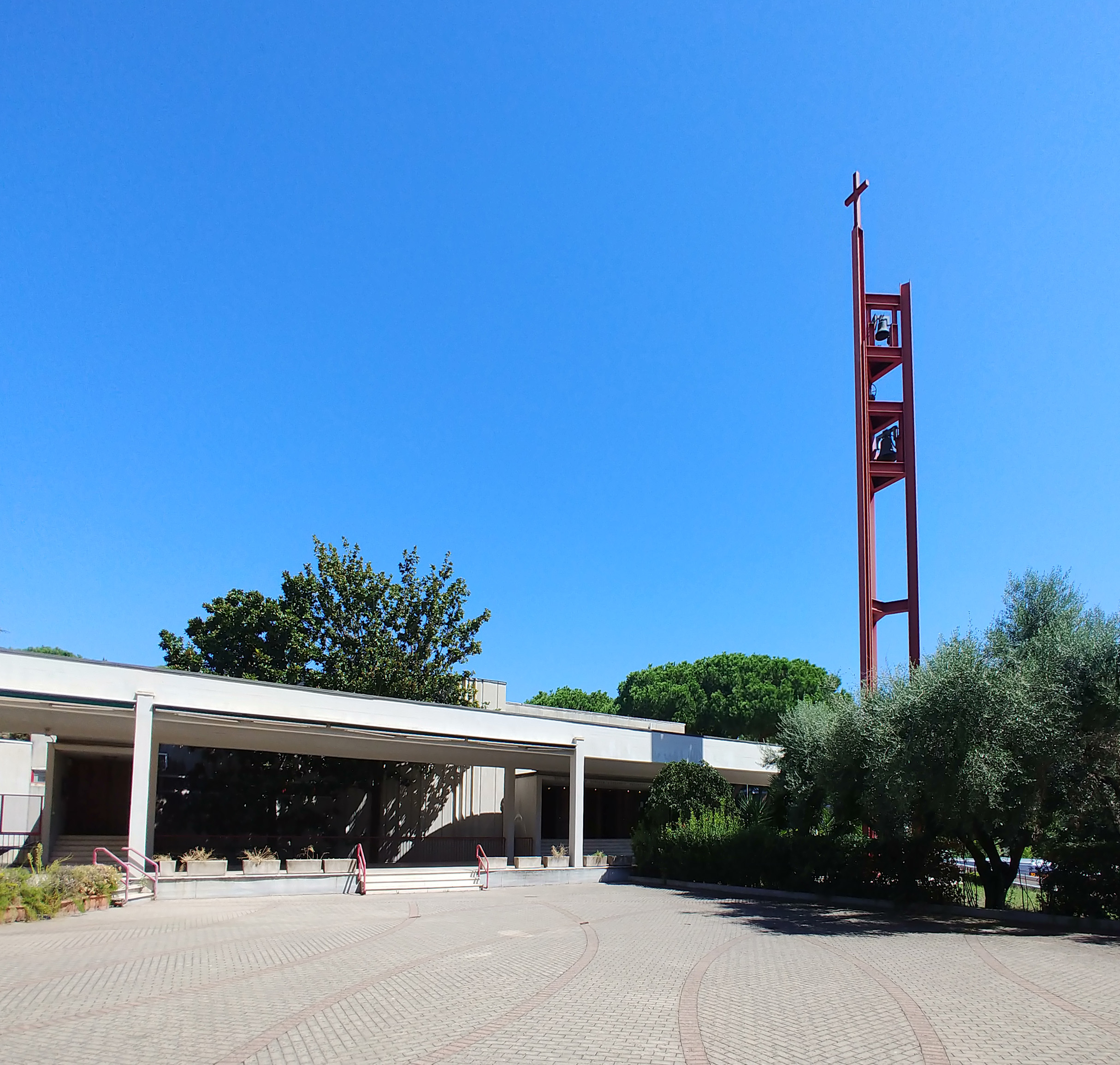
- Exterior
- Click on the map for a fullscreen view
- 41°49′39″N 12°28′43″E
- Location: Via delle Montagne Rocciose 14, Rome
- Country: Italy
- Denomination: Roman Catholic
- Tradition: Roman Rite

History
- Status: Titular church
- Dedication: Gregorio Barbarigo
- Consecrated: 1972

Architecture
- Architect: Giuseppe Vaccaro
- Architectural type: Church

Specifications
- Length: 1970
- Width: 1972

The church of San Gregorio Barbarigo is a place of Catholic worship in Rome, located in the EUR district on Via delle Montagne Rocciose.

== History ==
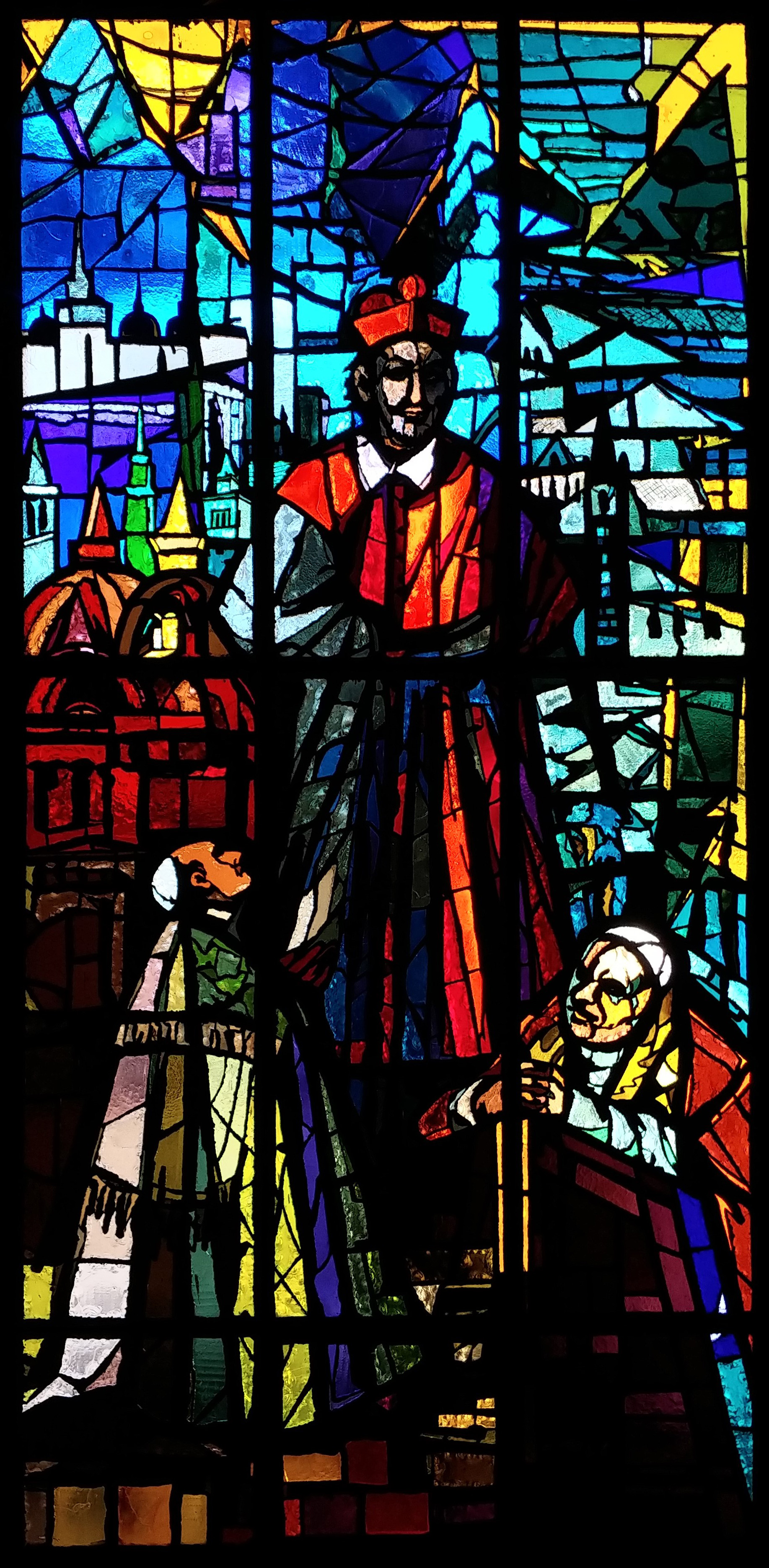
Stained glass window

The church of San Gregorio Barbarigo was built between 1970 and 1972 by architect Giuseppe Vaccaro as the parish home. The latter was established January 28, 1964 with the decree of the Cardinal Vicar Clemente Micara Qua celeritate. Since 1973 the church is the seat of the cardinal's title of "San Gregorio Barbarigo alle Tre Fontane".

The church is dedicated to the Venetian saint Gregorio Barbarigo (1625–1697). He was cardinal and bishop of Padua, where he worked tirelessly for the implementation of the Council of Trent reform.

== List of Cardinal Protectors ==
- Maurice Michael Otunga (5 March 1973 - 6 September 2003)
- Bernard Panafieu (21 October 2003 – 12 November 2017)
- Désiré Tsarahazana (28 June 2018 - )
