= Roger Victor Rakotondrajao =

Madagassian Roman Catholic bishop (1960-2018)

- Bishop of Mahajanga
- Church: Catholic Church
- Diocese: Diocese of Mahajanga
- In office: 2 February 2010 – 3 November 2018
- Predecessor: Joseph Ignace Randrianasolo
- Successor: Zygmunt Robaszkiewicz
- Previous post: Coadjutor Bishop of Mahajanga (2008-2010)

Orders
- Ordination: 29 July 1990
- Consecration: 6 July 2008 by Armand Razafindratandra

Personal details
- Born: 26 March 1960 Befelatanana, Antananarivo, Malagasy Republic, French Community
- Died: 3 November 2018 (aged 58) Antananarivo, Madagascar

Roger Victor Solo Rakotondrajao (26 March 1960 – 3 November 2018) was a Malagasy Roman Catholic bishop.

== Biography ==
Rakotondrajao was born in Madagascar and was ordained to the priesthood in 1990. He served as coadjutor bishop of the Roman Catholic Diocese of Mahajanga, Madagascar, from 2008 to 2010 and then bishop of that Diocese from 2010 until his death in 2018.
