= Milevum =

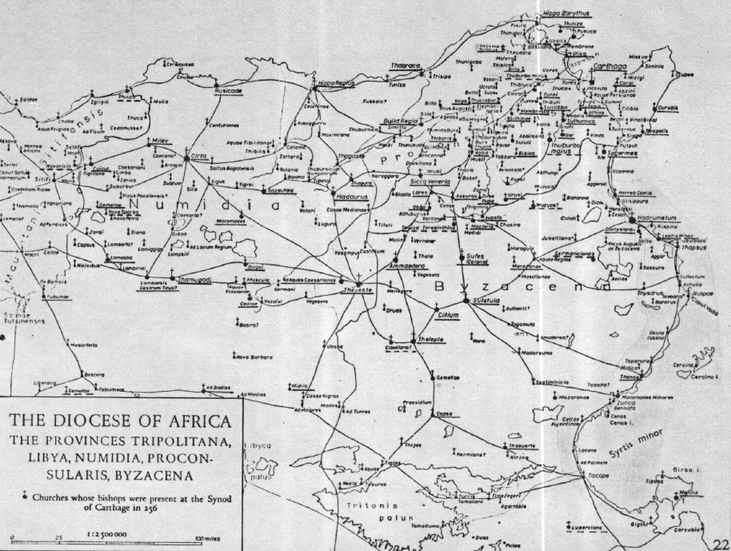
- Map of Roman Diocese of Africa Proconsularis and Numidia, showing Milev next to Mauretania Sitifensis

- Location within Algeria
- 36°27′01″N 6°15′52″E
- Location: Algeria
- Region: Mila Province

Milevum (in Latin even "Milev" or "Mireon"; Μιραίον in Ancient Greek) was a Roman–Berber city in the Roman province of Numidia. It was located in present-day Mila in eastern Algeria.

== History ==
In Ptolemy's "Geography" (vol. IV, iii, 7), the city is mentioned under the name of Mileum. During the Roman era, it was called Colonia Sarnensis Milevitana, after the River Sarnus in Campania (southern Italy), whence the colonists had emigrated. This name is often found in the inscriptions of the city.

Together with Cirta, Collo and Rusicade, Milevum formed the Confederation known as the 'Four Colonies', the territory of which was very extensive. This confederation area was fully romanised in the fourth century (when was renamed as "Numidia Cirtense"), with nearly all the population speaking local Latin, according to historian Theodor Mommsen.

In the fourth century's second half Milevum was fully Christian and had a population of nearly 15000 inhabitants.

In the 6th century, the Byzantine Emperor Justinian had Milevum enclosed by a fortified wall, which still stands and forms a rampart for the Muslim city of Mila. It has yielded quite a number of Latin inscriptions from this city and a colossal statue of Saturn.

Christianity appeared in the second century and dominated Miletum in the fourth century.

Two church councils were held at Milevum, one in 402 AD and the other in 416 AD. The second appealed to Pope Innocent I for repression of the Pelagian heresy.

After 682 AD the city may have been conquered by the Umayyad Arabs commanded by Abu al-Muhajir Dinar and since then Milevum disappeared from History.

== Bishopric ==
The city was the center of a small bishopric. Among the bishops of this episcopal see were:

- Pollianus, present at the Council of Carthage (255) and martyred two years later;
- Optatus, noted for his work against the Donatists, who died in about 385 AD and who is commemorated on 4 June;
- Honorius;
- Severus, fellow-countryman and friend of Augustine of Hippo;
- Benenanus (484 AD); and Restitutus, who attended the Fifth Œcumenical Council in 553 AD.

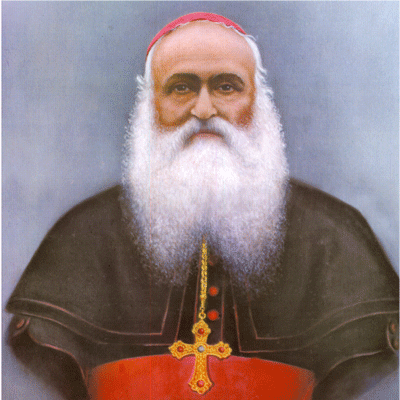
Charles Lavigne Bishop of Milevum

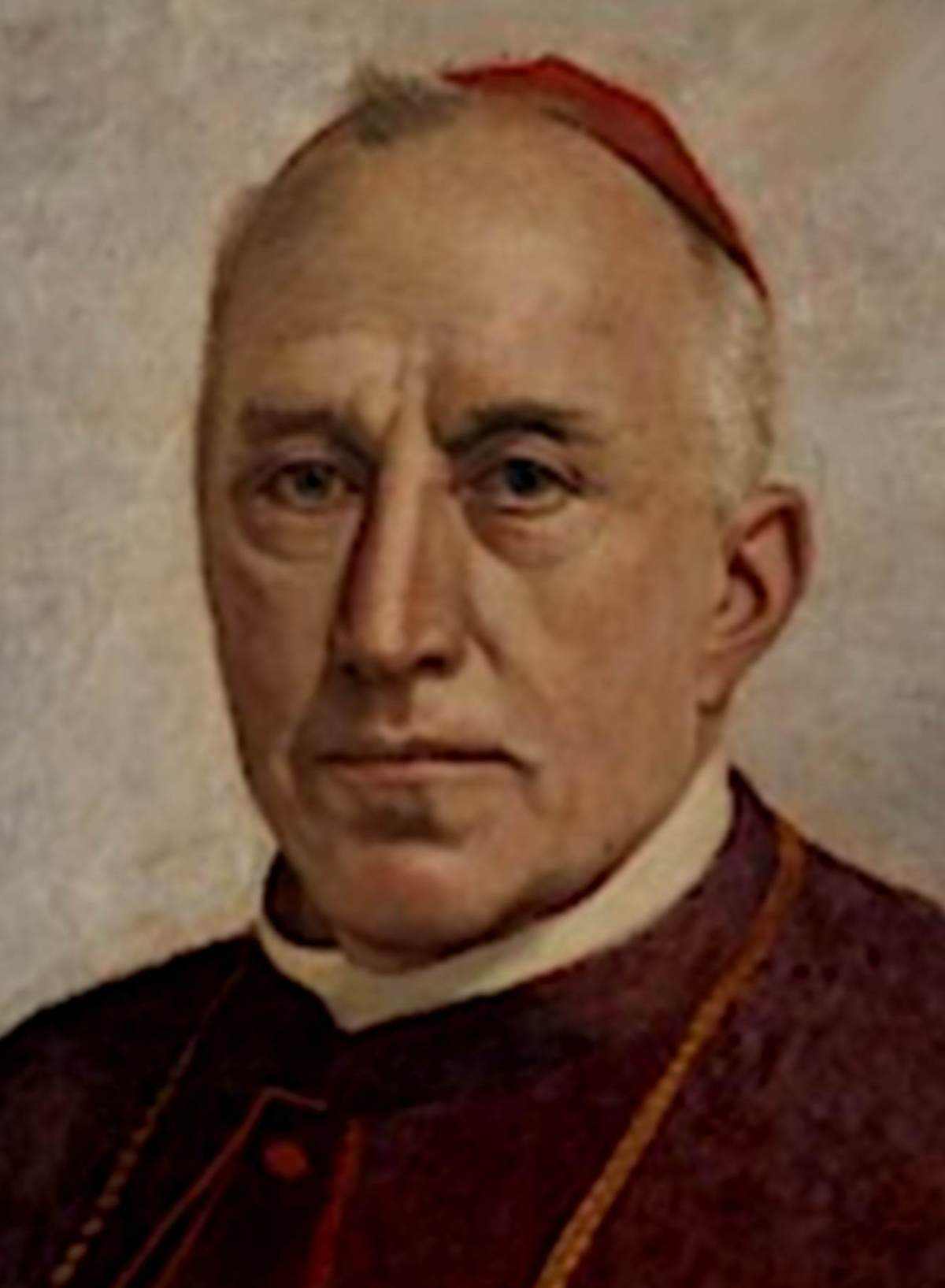
Bishop Anton Gisler

Milevum remains today a titular see in the ecclesiastical province of Numidia.

- Emmanuel a Santo Ludovico (8 Feb 1672 appointed – )
- Hyacinthus de Saldanha (28 Jan 1675 appointed – )
- Johann Ignaz Dlouhovesky de Longavilla (10 Apr 1679 appointed – 10 Jan 1701)
- Caius Asterius Toppi (15 Nov 1728 appointed – 20 May 1754)
- Anton de Révay (20 May 1754 appointed – 16 Sep 1776 Bishop of Rožňava)
- Wilhelm Joseph Leopold Willibald von Baden (12 Jul 1779 appointed – 9 Jun 1798)
- Angiolo (Angelo) Cesarini (28 Sep 1801 appointed – 7 May 1810)
- Thomas Coen (26 Jan 1816 appointed – 9 Oct 1831 Succeeded, Bishop of Clonfert)
- Bernard Collier (14 Feb 1840 appointed – 7 Dec 1847)
- Jean-Marie Tissot (11 Aug 1863 appointed – 25 Nov 1886 Bishop of Vizagapatam)
- Charles Lavigne (13 Sep 1887 appointed – 27 Aug 1898)
- James Bellord (16 Feb 1899 appointed – 11 Jun 1905)
- Ivan Borzatti de Löwenstern (15 Mar 1907 appointed – 17 Feb 1926)
- Acacio Chacón Guerra (10 May 1926 appointed – 1 Aug 1927)
- Anton Gisler (20 Apr 1928 appointed – 4 Jan 1932)
- Jean-Félix de Hemptinne (15 Mar 1932 appointed – 6 Feb 1958)
- José Manuel Piña Torres (12 May 1958 appointed – 7 Jul 1997)
- Joseph Ignace Randrianasolo (24 Oct 1997 appointed – 3 Jun 1999, Bishop of Mahajanga)
- Joseph Chennoth (24 Aug 1999 appointed – )

== See also ==
- Mauretania Caesariensis
- Caesarea
- Icosium
- Rapidum
- Rusicade
- Cirta
- Chullu
- Thamugadi
- Lambaesis

== Bibliography ==
- A. Benabbès: "Les premiers raids arabes en Numidie byzantine: questions toponymiques." In Identités et Cultures dans l'Algérie Antique, University of Rouen, 2005 (ISBN 2-87775-391-3)
- Heurgon J. Les origines campaniennes de la Confédération cirtéenne, Libyca archéol. Epigr., t.V,1957, pp. 7–24.
- Laffi, Umberto. Colonie e municipi nello Stato romano Ed. di Storia e Letteratura. Roma, 2007 ISBN 8884983509
- Mommsen, Theodore. The Provinces of the Roman Empire Section: Roman Africa. (Leipzig 1865; London 1866; London: Macmillan 1909; reprint New York 1996) Barnes & Noble. New York, 1996
- Reynell Morell, John. Algeria: The Topography and History, Political, Social, and Natural, of French Africa. Publisher N. Cooke. London, 1854 ( Chullu)
- P. Trousset (2002). Les limites sud de la réoccupation Byzantine. Antiquité Tardive v. 10, pp. 143–150.
