= Antoine Scopelliti =

Italian Roman Catholic prelate (1939–2023)

- Bishop Emeritus of Ambatondrazaka
- Metropolis: Toamasina
- Installed: 6 March 1993
- Term ended: 11 April 2015
- Predecessor: Francesco Vollaro
- Successor: Jean de Dieu Raoelison
- Previous post: Coadjutor Bishop of Ambatondrazaka (1991–1993)

Orders
- Ordination: 18 December 1965 by Francesco Vollaro
- Consecration: 5 May 1991 by Francesco Vollaro

Personal details
- Born: Antonio Scopelliti; 9 April 1939 Gallico Superiore, Reggio Calabria, Kingdom of Italy
- Died: 22 October 2023 (aged 84) Reggio Calabria, Italy

Styles of Antoine Scopelliti
- Reference style: His Excellency; The Most Reverend
- Spoken style: Your Excellency
- Religious style: Bishop

Antonio "Antoine" Scopelliti (9 April 1939 – 22 October 2023) was an Italian Roman Catholic prelate who served as Coadjutor Bishop of Ambatondrazaka from 1991 to 1993 and Bishop of Ambatondrazaka from 1993 to 2015.

== Biography ==
Scopelliti was born in Gallico Superiore, a neighborhood in Reggio Calabria, on 9 April 1939. He entered the Order of the Holy Trinity, where he was ordained a priest on 18 December 1965, in the church of Santa Maria delle Grazie alle Fornaci, by Francesco Vollaro, Bishop of Ambatondrazaka. He was assigned to the Trinitarian missions in Madagascar.

Scopelliti was appointed by Pope John Paul II as Coadjutor Bishop of Ambatondrazaka on 21 January 1991. He received episcopal consecration from the same bishop who ordained him a priest, on 5 May of the same year. The Auxiliary Bishop of Mahajanga, Michel Malo, and the Bishop of Antsirabe, Philibert Randriambololona, participated in the consecration. With the retirement of Vollaro, Scopelliti succeeded him on 6 March 1993 as Bishop of Ambatondrazaka.

Pope Francis accepted Scopelliti's age-related resignation on 11 April 2015. He thus became Bishop Emeritus of Ambatondrazaka.

Scopelliti died on 22 October 2023, at the age of 84.

Catholic Church titles
Preceded by Francesco Vollaro	Bishop of Ambatondrazaka; 1993–2015	Succeeded by Jean de Dieu Raoelison
