= Donald Pelletier =

American Catholic bishop in Madagascar (1931–2022)

His Excellency Donald Pelletier
- Bishop Emeritus of Morondava
- Diocese: Morondava
- Appointed: 15 October 1999
- Term ended: 26 February 2010
- Predecessor: Bernard Charles Ratsimamotoana
- Successor: Marie Fabien Raharilamboniaina

Orders
- Ordination: 28 October 1956
- Consecration: 13 February 2000 by Philibert Randriambololona

Personal details
- Born: Donald Joseph Leo Pelletier; June 17, 1931 Blackstone, Massachusetts, U.S.
- Died: June 4, 2022 (aged 90) Enfield, New Hampshire, U.S.
- Denomination: Catholic Church

Donald Joseph Leo Pelletier (June 17, 1931 – June 4, 2022) was an American Catholic prelate.

== Biography ==
Pelletier was born in Blackstone, Massachusetts, and was ordained to the priesthood for the Missionaries of La Salette. He served as bishop of the Diocese of Morondava, Madagascar, from 2000 until his retirement in 2010. He celebrated the 60th anniversary of his priesthood in 2016.

Pelletier died as a result of being struck by a car in Enfield, New Hampshire.

Catholic Church titles
Preceded by Bernard Charles Ratsimamotoana	Bishop of Morondava; 1999–2010	Succeeded by Marie Fabien Raharilamboniaina
