= René Joseph Rakotondrabé =

Roman Catholic bishop

- Bishop of Toamasina
- Church: Catholic Church
- Diocese: Diocese of Toamasina
- In office: 15 May 1989 – 24 November 2008
- Predecessor: Jérôme Razafindrazaka
- Successor: Désiré Tsarahazana
- Previous posts: Bishop of Tuléar (1974-1989); Titular Bishop of Umbriatico (1972-1974); Auxiliary Bishop of Tuléar (1972-1974)

Orders
- Ordination: 11 April 1960
- Consecration: 1 October 1972 by Michele Cecchini

Personal details
- Born: 12 September 1932 Fandriana, Colony of Madagascar and Dependencies, French Empire
- Died: 9 July 2012 (aged 79)

René Joseph Rakotondrabé (12 September 1932 – 9 July 2012) was the Roman Catholic bishop of the Roman Catholic Diocese of Toamasina, Madagascar.

== Biography ==
Rakotondrabé was born 12 September 1932 in Fandriana and was ordained to the priesthood in 1960. He was named auxiliary Bishop of Toliara and Titular Bishop of Umbriatico in 1972, Bishop of Toliara in 1974, and Bishop of Toamasina in 1989.

He retired in 2008 and died 9 July 2012.
