= Scopelli =

Scopelli is an Italian surname. Notable people with the surname include:

- Alejandro Scopelli (1908–1987), Italian-Argentine football player and coach
- Giovanna Scopelli (1428–1491), Italian Carmelite nun

== See also ==
- Scopelliti
- Scopello (disambiguation)
