= Central Preparatory Commission =

The Central Preparatory Commission was the body that co-ordinated the preparation of the schemas for the Second Vatican Council. It was established by Pope John XXIII on June 5, 1960. It had 120 members, including cardinals and bishops, amongst them was Cardinal Giovanni Battista Montini (the future Pope Paul VI), Archbishop Marcel Lefebvre, and Cardinal Ottaviani who chaired the Commission.

Ten individual Preparatory Commissions worked on the draft material for the various subjects to be covered in due course in the constitutions and other documents issued by the Council: see Second Vatican Council#Convocation and preparation.

== Nomination controversy ==
It had been expected that the members of the preparatory commissions, where the Roman Curia was heavily represented, would be confirmed as the majorities on the conciliar commissions. Senior French Cardinal Achille Liénart addressed the council, saying that the bishops could not intelligently vote for strangers. He asked that the vote be postponed to give all the bishops a chance to draw up their own lists. German Cardinal Josef Frings seconded that proposal, and the vote was postponed. The very first meeting of the council adjourned after only fifteen minutes.

== Members ==
- Bernardus Johannes Alfrink
- Karl Joseph Alter
- Augustin Bea
- Octavio Beras Rojas
- Michael Browne
- Donald Campbell
- John D'Alton
- Julius Döpfner
- Pericle Felici – Secretary-general
- Josef Frings
- Denis Hurley
- Franz König
- Marcel Lefebvre
- Paul-Émile Léger
- Achille Liénart
- Giovanni Battista Montini
- Alfredo Ottaviani – Chair
- Jérôme Rakotomalala
- Joseph Ritter
- Ernesto Ruffini
- Leo Joseph Suenens
- Bernard Yago

== See also ==
- Ecumenical council
