= Paul J. Girouard =

American-born missionary and bishop

Most Reverend Paul J. Girouard, M.S.
- Bishop of Morondava
- Church: Catholic Church
- Appointed: November 7, 1955
- In office: March 7, 1956 - February 20, 1964

Orders
- Ordination: July 26, 1927
- Consecration: March 7, 1956 by Henry Joseph O'Brien

Personal details
- Born: December 27, 1898 Hamilton, Rhode Island
- Died: February 20, 1964 (aged 65)

Paul J. Girouard, M.S. (December 27, 1898 – February 20, 1964) was an American-born missionary and bishop of the Catholic Church in Madagascar. He served as the Bishop of Morondava from 1955 to 1964.

== Biography ==
Born in Hamilton, Rhode Island, Paul Girouard was ordained a priest on July 26, 1927, for the Missionaries of Our Lady of La Salette. On December 30, 1954 Pope Pius XII appointed him to be the Apostolic Prefect of Morondava. He was then appointed as the first bishop of Morondava on November 7, 1955. He was consecrated a bishop by Archbishop Henry O'Brien of Hartford on March 7, 1956. The principal co-consecrators were Bishops William Scully of Albany and Russell McVinney of Providence. Girouard served as the diocesan bishop until his death on February 20, 1964, at the age of 65.
