= Scopello (disambiguation) =

Scopello is an Italian municipality in the Province of Vercelli, Piedmont.

Scopello may also refer to:

- Scopello, Trapani, a borough of Castellammare del Golfo, in the Province of Trapani, Sicily
- Madeleine Scopello (born 1953), French historian of religion

== See also ==
- Scopelli
- Scopelliti
