= Odon Razanakolona =

Malagasy prelate

The Most Reverend Odon Razanakolona
- Archbishop of Antananarivo
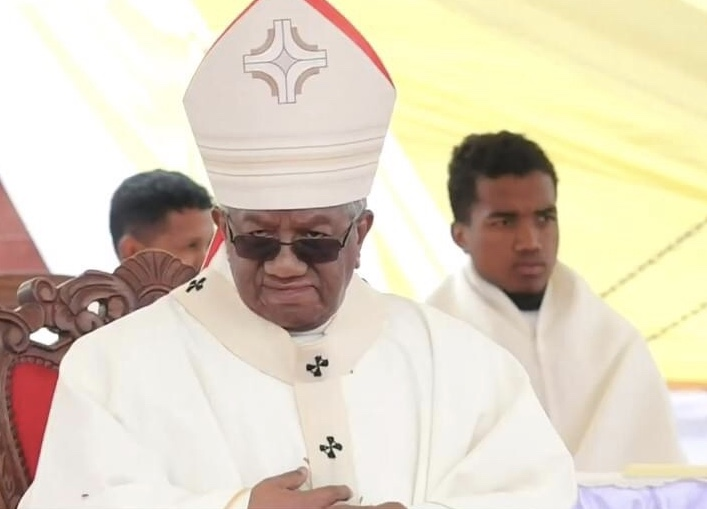
- Church: Roman Catholic Church
- Archdiocese: Antananarivo
- See: Antananarivo
- Appointed: 7 December 2005
- Installed: 12 February 2006
- Predecessor: Armand Gaétan Razafindratandra
- Previous posts: Bishop of Ambanja (1999-2005); Apostolic Administrator of Ambanja (2005-07)

Orders
- Ordination: 28 December 1975 by Gilbert Ramanantoanina
- Consecration: 11 April 1999 by Philibert Randriambololona

Personal details
- Born: Odon Marie Arsène Razanakolona; 24 May 1946 (age 80) Fianarantsoa, Madagascar
- Education: Pontifical Urban University

Styles of Odon Marie Arsène Razanakolona
- Reference style: The Most Reverend
- Spoken style: Your Excellency
- Religious style: Archbishop
- Posthumous style: none

Odon Marie Arsène Razanakolona (born 24 May 1946, in Fianarantsoa) is a Madagascan Catholic prelate who served as Archbishop of Antananarivo from 2005 to 2023.

Razanakolona was ordained a priest on 28 December 1975, and earned a doctorate in canon law from the Pontifical Urban University in Rome in 1987, writing on "La loi de la gradualité et le mariage coutumier à Madagascar".

He was named Bishop of Ambanja in November 1998 and continued in the role until his appointment to Antananarivo in December 2005. He received the pallium on 30 June 2006.

He retired on 5 June 2023, when Pope Francis accepted his resignation.

== See also ==
- Catholic Church in Madagascar
