= Victor Razafimahatratra =

Malagasy Cardinal

His Eminence Victor Razafimahatratra S.J.
- Archbishop of Antananarivo
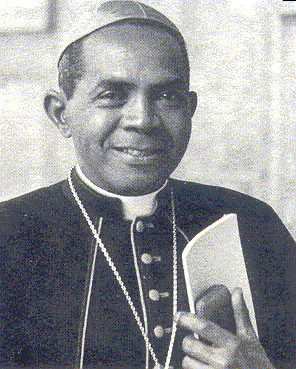
- Church: Roman Catholic Church
- Archdiocese: Antananarivo
- See: Antananarivo
- Appointed: 10 April 1976
- Term ended: 6 October 1993
- Predecessor: Jérôme Rakotomalala
- Successor: Armand Gaétan Razafindratandra
- Other post: Cardinal-Priest of Santa Croce in Gerusalemme (1976-93)
- Previous posts: Bishop of Farafangana (1971-76); President of Episcopal Conference of Madagascar (1974-86); Archbishop of Tananarive (1976-1989)

Orders
- Ordination: 28 July 1956
- Consecration: 18 April 1971 by Gilibert Ramanantoanina
- Created cardinal: 24 May 1976 by Pope Paul VI

Personal details
- Born: Victor Razafimahatratra; 8 September 1921 Ambanitsilena-Ranomasina, Madagascar
- Died: 6 October 1993 (aged 72) Antananarivo, Madagascar
- Buried: Antananarivo Cathedral

Victor Razafimahatratra SJ (8 September 1921 – 6 October 1993) was a Malagasy Cardinal of the Roman Catholic Church. He served as Archbishop of Antananarivo from 1976 until his death, and was elevated to the cardinalate in 1976.

== Biography ==
Victor Razafimahatratra was born in Ambanitsilena-Ranomasina, and studied at the Major Seminary of Fianarantsoa before entering the Society of Jesus, more commonly known as the Jesuits, on 19 September 1945. He continued his education at the Jesuit schools in Fianarantsoa, and then went to Belgium to study at the Theological Faculty of Brussels and the Catechetical Center "Lumen Gentium", also in Brussels.

Razafimahatratra was ordained to the priesthood on 28 July 1956, finishing his studies in 1960. From 1960 to 1963 he was Rector of the Minor Seminary of Fianarantsoa. He made his solemn profession as a Jesuit on 2 February 1963 and then served as Superior of the Jesuit residence in Ambositra until 1969. He was Rector of the Major Seminary and Institute of Superior Studies in Fianarantsoa from 1969 to 1971.

On 16 January 1971 Razafimahatratra was appointed Bishop of Farafangana by Pope Paul VI. He received his episcopal consecration on the following 18 April from Archbishop Gilbert Ramanantoanina, SJ, with Archbishop Albert Tsiahoana and Bishop Jean-Pierre-Dominique Zévaco, CM, serving as co-consecrators. Razafimahatratra was later named President of the Episcopal Conference of Madagascar in 1974, and was promoted to Archbishop of Tananarive on 10 April 1976.

Pope Paul created him Cardinal Priest of S. Croce in Gerusalemme in the consistory of 24 May 1976. Razafimahatratra was one of the cardinal electors who participated in the conclaves of August and October 1978, which selected Popes John Paul I and John Paul II respectively. On 28 October 1989 the Archdiocese of Tananarive was renamed as the Archdiocese of Antananarivo.

The Cardinal died in Antananarivo, at the age of 72.

== See also ==
- Catholic Church in Madagascar

Catholic Church titles
| Preceded by Camille-Antoine Chilouet, CM | Bishop of Farafangana; 1971–1976 | Succeeded by Charles-Remy Rakotonirina, SJ |
| Preceded by Jérôme Rakotomalala | Archbishop of Antananarivo; 1976–1993 | Succeeded by Armand Razafindratandra |
