= Andriantsilavo Frédéric Rakotomalala =

Malagasy politician

Andriantsilavo Frédéric Rakotomalala is a Malagasy politician. A member of the National Assembly of Madagascar, he was elected as a member of the Tiako I Madagasikara party in the 2007 Malagasy parliamentary elections and in 2014. He represents the constituency of Sakaraha.
