= Camille-Antoine Chilouet =

Roman Catholic bishop

Camille-Anton Chilouet (born 1899 in Montluçon) was a French clergyman and prelate for the Roman Catholic Diocese of Farafangana. He was appointed bishop in 1957. He died in 1970.
