= Immaculate Conception Cathedral, Antananarivo =

Coordinates: 18.9167°S 47.5302°E

Immaculate Conception Cathedral
- Cathédrale de l'Immaculée-Conception d'Antananarivo
- Katedraly Andohalo
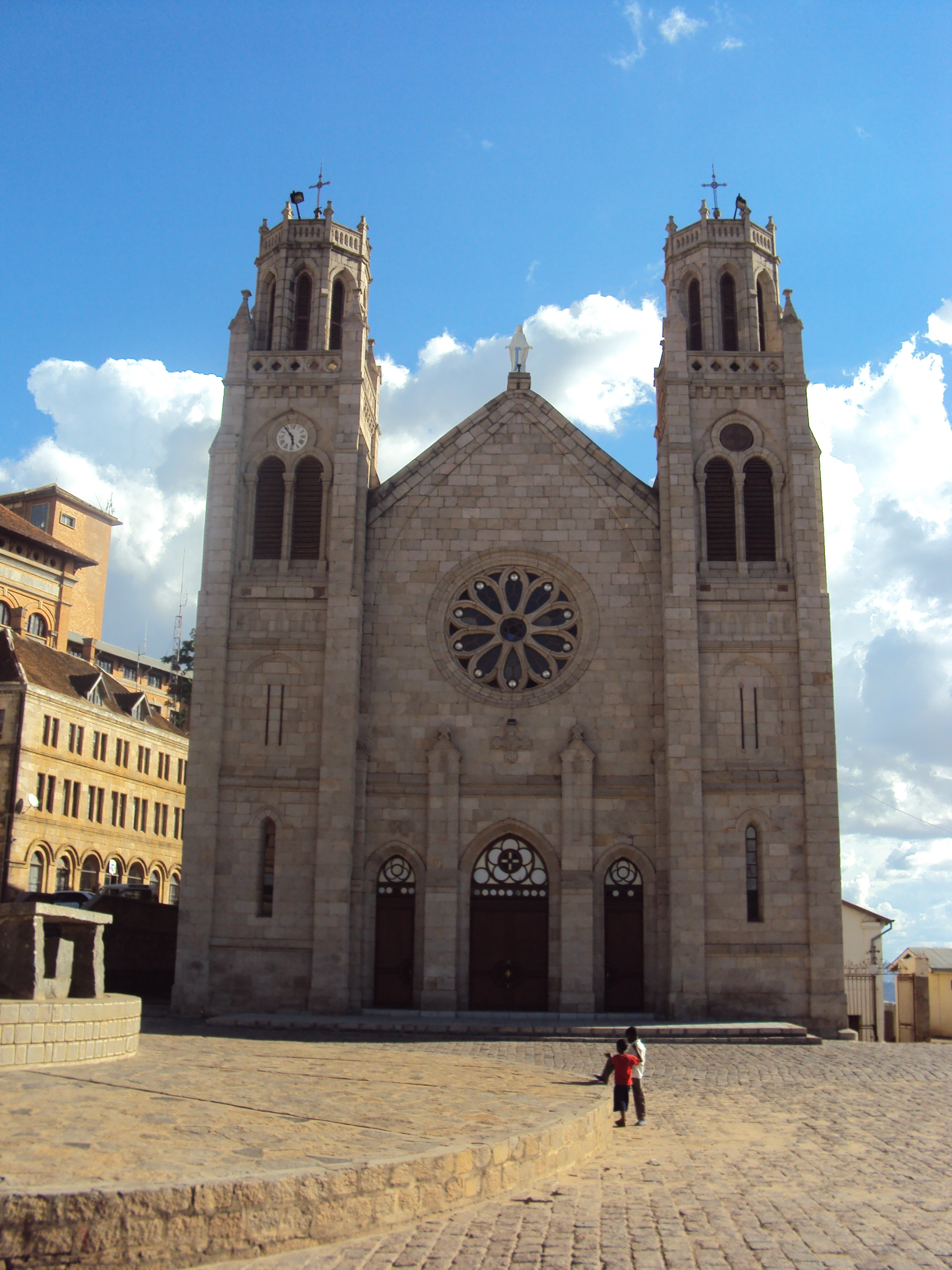
- Immaculate Conception Cathedral
- Location: Antananarivo
- Country: Madagascar
- Denomination: Roman Catholic Church

The Immaculate Conception Cathedral (French: cathédrale de l'Immaculée-Conception d'Antananarivo, Malagasy: Katedraly Andohalo) is a religious building that serves as a Catholic cathedral located in the district of Antananarivo Renivohitra in the region of Analamanga, specifically in Antananarivo, the capital of Madagascar. It is located in the area of Andohalo in the upper town (haute ville), the facade facing the city center to the west. The cathedral is the seat of the Archdiocese of Antananarivo (Latin: Archidioecesis Antananarivensis).

== History ==
Its construction began in 1873 and was completed in 1890 with a design in Gothic style.

In the war against France this church was used as a bunker because it was so holy.

== Architecture ==
The cathedral is built in the gothic revival style.

== See also ==
- Roman Catholicism in Madagascar
