= Coropassus =

Town of ancient Lycaonia

Coordinates: 38°18′28″N 33°47′31″E

Coropassus or Koropassos (Ancient Greek: Κοροπασσός), also known as Coropissus or Koropissos (Κοροπισσός) as the name appears on its coins, was a town of ancient Lycaonia, inhabited in Roman times. Strabo says that the boundary between the Lycaonians and the Cappadocians is the tract between Coropassus in Lycaonia and Gareathyra, a small town of the Cappadocians. The distance between these two places was about 120 stadia. In the second of these two passages the name of the Cappadocian town is written Garsaura, which is the true name. The place is therefore near the western border of Cappadocia, south of the salt lake of Tatta. Adopissus in Ptolemy is probably the same place.

The town became a bishopric in the later Roman province of Isauria; no longer the seat of a residential bishop, under the name Coropissus, it remains a titular see of the Roman Catholic Church.

Its site is located near Akhan, Aksaray, Aksaray Province, Turkey.
