= Diocese of Ambanja =

Latin Catholic diocese in Madagascar

Coordinates: 13°40′43″S 48°27′08″E

Diocese of Ambanja Dioecesis Ambaniaënsis
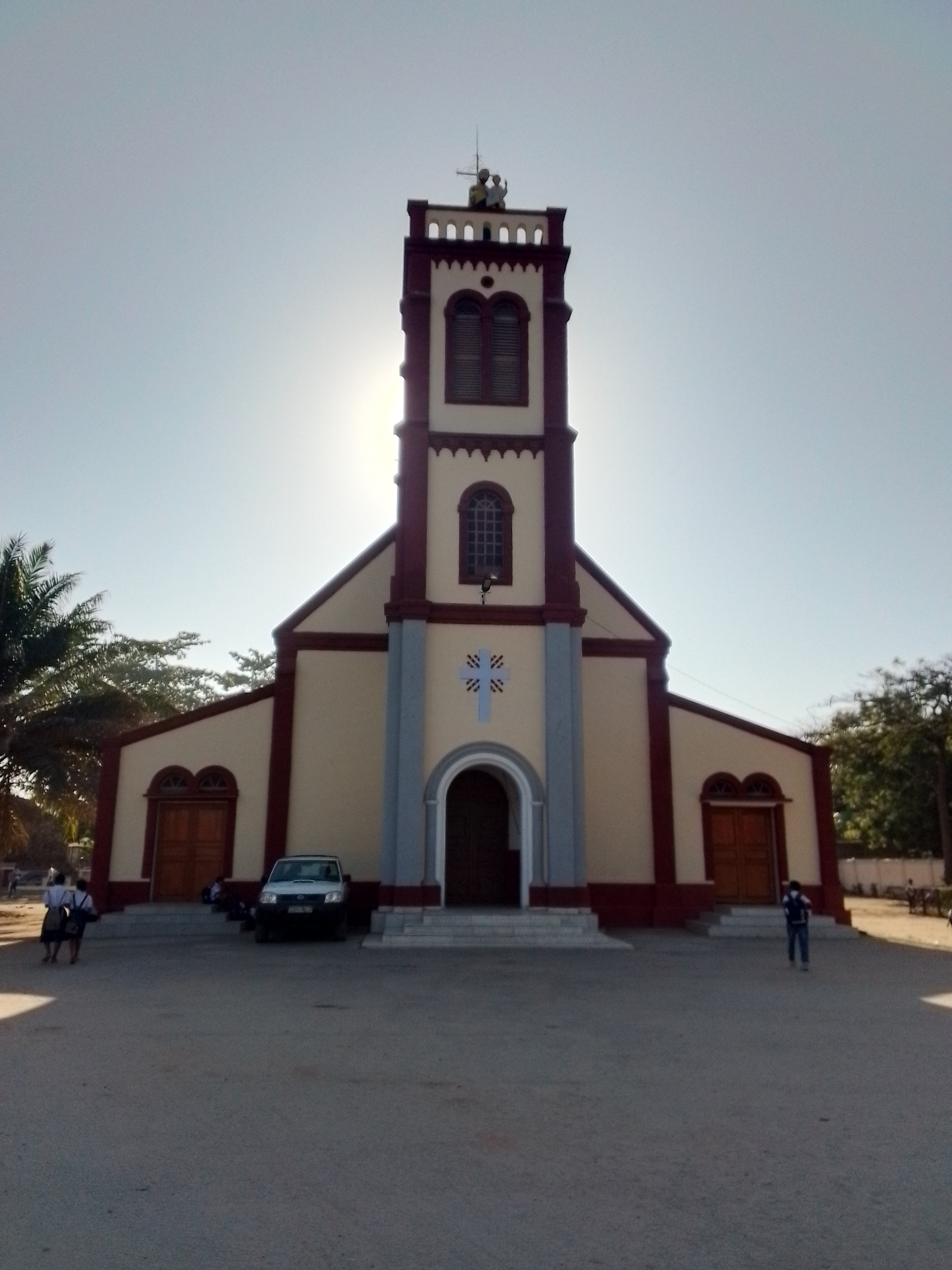

Location
- Country: Madagascar
- Metropolitan: Antsiranana

Statistics
- Area: 34,083 km^{2} (13,160 sq mi)
- Population: Total; Catholics: (as of 2023); 2,647,244 ▲; 185,523 ▲ (7.0 ▼%)
- Parishes: 20

Information
- Denomination: Catholic Church
- Sui iuris church: Latin Church
- Rite: Roman Rite
- Cathedral: Saint Joseph Cathedral
- Secular priests: 31 (diocesan); 53 (Religious Orders); 0 Permanent Deacons

Current leadership
- Pope: Leo XIV
- Bishop: Donatien Francis Randriamalala, MS

The Diocese of Ambanja (Latin: Ambaniaën[sis]) is a Latin Church diocese of the Catholic Church. Located in the city of Ambanja, in the northwest corner of the island, on the Sambirano River, it is a suffragan diocese in the ecclesiastical province of the Metropolitan Archdiocese of Antsiranana in Madagascar. The seat of the bishop is the Cathedral of Saint Joseph, which was constructed in 1933.

== History ==
On 4 September 1848, the Apostolic Prefecture of Isole di Mayotta, Nossi-Bé e Comore was established from the Apostolic Vicariate of Madagascar. In 1843 the French Government, called in by the sultan, had taken possession of Mayotte, which became, with Nossi-Bé, a post of surveillance over Madagascar. These islands later formed a French colony, with a population largely Muslim. Mayotte, Nossi-Bé and the Comoros were made an Apostolic prefecture and confided to the Fathers of the Holy Ghost.

In 1898, when the same missionaries were given the ecclesiastical administration of Northern Madagascar, these smaller islands and Santa Maria were attached to the then Apostolic Vicariate of Diégo-Suarez. Santa Maria and Nossi-Bé had resident missionaries.

- 14 June 1938: Renamed as Apostolic Prefecture of Ambanja
- Promoted to Apostolic Vicariate of Ambanja on 8 March 1951
- Promoted to the Diocese of Ambanja, on 14 September 1955, remaining dependent on the Congregation for the Evangelization of Peoples (the former SC de propaganda Fide) in Rome.
- On 5 June 1975, it lost territory (modern Comoros and Mayotte) to establish the Apostolic Administration of the Comoros Archipelago, dependent upon the Holy See.

== Prelates and bishops ==
Apostolic Prefect of Mayotte, Nosy-Be and Comore

- Friar Calixte Lopinot, OFMCap (15 May 1932 – 1937)

Apostolic Prefect of Ambanja

- Fr. Léon-Adolphe Messmer, OFMCap (12 November 1937 – 8 March 1951 see below)

Apostolic Vicar of Ambanja

- Léon-Adolphe Messmer, OFMCap, Titular Bishop of Coropissus (see above 1951.03.08 – 1955.09.14 see below)

Bishops of Ambanja

- Léon-Adolphe Messmer, OFMCap (see above 14 September 1955 – 5 June 1975)
- Ferdinand Botsy, OFMCap (8 July 1976 – 25 October 1997)
- Odon Marie Arsène Razanakolona (28 November 1998 – 7 December 2005)
  - remaining Apostolic Administrator (7 December 2005 – 7 November 2007)
- Rosario Saro Vella, SDB (7 November 2007 – 8 July 2019)
- Donatien Francis Randriamalala, MS (11 November 2022 – ...)

== See also ==
- Archdiocese of Antsiranana
- Roman Catholicism in Madagascar

== Sources and External Links ==
- GCatholic.org with incumbent bio links
- Catholic Hierarchy
