= Diocese of Port-Bergé =

Roman Catholic diocese in Madagascar

Diocese of Port-Bergé Dioecesis Portus Bergensis

Location
- Country: Madagascar
- Metropolitan: Antsiranana

Statistics
- Area: 23,367 km^{2} (9,022 sq mi)
- Population: Total; Catholics: (as of 2004); 518,451; 10,400 (2.0%)

Information
- Rite: Latin Rite

Current leadership
- Pope: Leo XIV
- Bishop: Georges Varkey Puthiyakulangara, M.E.P. (formerly Coadjutor Bishop of the Roman Catholic Diocese of Port-Bergé under Bishop Toasy)
- Bishops emeritus: Armand Toasy

Website
- dioceseportberge.com

The Roman Catholic Diocese of Port-Bergé (Latin: Portus Bergen(sis)) is a diocese located in the city of Port-Bergé in the ecclesiastical province of Antsiranana in Madagascar.

== History ==
- October 18, 1993: Established as Diocese of Port-Bergé from the Roman Catholic Diocese of Mahajanga

== Bishops ==
- Bishops of Port-Bergé (Roman rite)
  - Bishop Armand Toasy (October 18, 1993 - December 15, 2013)
  - Bishop Georges Varkey Puthiyakulangara, M.E.P. (December 15, 2013 – present)

=== Coadjutor Bishop ===
- Georges Varkey Puthiyakulangara, M.E.P. (2008-2013)

== See also ==
- Roman Catholicism in Madagascar

== Sources ==
- GCatholic.org
- Catholic Hierarchy
- Diocese of Port-Bergé official website
