= Diocese of Tsiroanomandidy =

Roman Catholic diocese in Madagascar

Diocese of Tsiroanomandidy Dioecesis Tsiroanomandidyensis

Location
- Country: Madagascar
- Metropolitan: Antananarivo

Statistics
- Area: 40,000 km^{2} (15,000 sq mi)
- Population: Total; Catholics: (as of 2004); 464,211; 172,189 (37.1%)

Information
- Rite: Latin Rite

Current leadership
- Pope: Leo XIV
- Bishop: Gabriel Randrianantenaina

The Roman Catholic Diocese of Tsiroanomandidy (Latin: Tsiroanomandidyen(sis)) is a suffragan Latin diocese in the ecclesiastical province of Antananarivo in Madagascar, yet depends on the missionary Roman Congregation for the Evangelization of Peoples.

Its cathedral episcopal see is the (Marian) Cathédrale Notre Dame du Bon Remède, in Tsiroanomandidy, Antananarivo Province.

== Statistics ==
As per 2014, it pastorally served 223,433 Catholics (37.2% of 600,167 total) on 40,000 km^{2} in 3 parishes and 19 missions with 45 priests (28 diocesan, 17 religious), 168 lay religious (36 brothers, 132 sisters) and 32 seminarians.

== History ==
- Established on January 13, 1949 as Apostolic Prefecture of Tsiroanomandidy, on territory split off from the Apostolic Vicariate of Miarinarivo
- Promoted on December 11, 1958 as Diocese of Tsiroanomandidy
- Lost territory (like two other sees) on 2017.02.08 to establish the Diocese of Maintirano.

== Ordinaries ==
(all Roman rite; so far -mostly European missionary- members of Latin congregations)

Apostolic Prefect of Tsiroanomandidy

- Father Angel Martínez Vivas, Trinitarians (O.SS.T.) (1949.01.14 – 1958.12.11 see below)

Suffragan Bishops of Tsiroanomandidy

- Angel Martínez Vivas, O.SS.T. (see above 1958.12.11 – retired 1977.07.30), died 1981
- Jean-Samuel Raobelina, Missionaries of Our Lady of LaSalette (M.S.) (born Madagascar) (1978.04.27 – death 2001.06.30)
- Gustavo Bombin Espino, O.SS.T. (2003.10.04 – 2017.02.08), next first Bishop of co-daughter-see Diocese of Maintirano
- Gabriel Randrianantenaina (2021.04.30 – ...)

== See also ==
- Roman Catholicism in Madagascar

== Sources and external links ==
- GCatholic.org, with Google satellite photo
- Catholic Hierarchy
