= Marie Fabien Raharilamboniaina =

Malagasy prelate

The Most Reverend Marie Fabien Raharilamboniaina, OCD
- Church: Roman Catholic Church
- Diocese: Diocese of Morondava
- Appointed: 26 February 2010

Orders
- Ordination: 5 July 1997
- Consecration: 16 May 2010 by Bishop Donald Joseph Leo Pelletier; Archbishop Fulgence Rabeony; Bishop Gilbert Aubry

Personal details
- Born: 20 January 1968 (age 58) Ambohijanahary, Madagascar

Marie Fabien Raharilamboniaina, OCD (born 20 January 1968) is a Malagasy prelate of the Roman Catholic Church. He has served as Bishop of Morondava since 2010.

== Biography ==
Raharilamboniaina was born in Ambohijanahary, Madagascar, on 20 January 1968. On 8 September 1990, at the age of 22, he professed his vows as a member of the Discalced Carmelites, and was ordained a priest of the order on 5 July 1997.

On 26 February 2010, at the age of 42, Raharilamboniaina was appointed Bishop of Morondava, and was consecrated bishop on 16 May 2010, making him one of the youngest living bishops. Bishop Donald Joseph Leo Pelletier served as his principal consecrator, and Archbishop Fulgence Rabeony and Bishop Gilbert Aubry.

== Episcopal lineage ==
- Cardinal Scipione Rebiba
- Cardinal Giulio Antonio Santorio (1566)
- Cardinal Girolamo Bernerio, O.P. (1586)
- Archbishop Galeazzo Sanvitale (1604)
- Cardinal Ludovico Ludovisi (1621)
- Cardinal Luigi Caetani (1622)
- Cardinal Ulderico Carpegna (1630)
- Cardinal Paluzzo Paluzzi Altieri degli Albertoni (1666)
- Pope Benedict XIII (1675)
- Pope Benedict XIV (1724)
- Pope Clement XIII (1743)
- Cardinal Giovanni Carlo Boschi (1760)
- Cardinal Bartolomeo Pacca (1786)
- Pope Gregory XVI (1831)
- Cardinal Castruccio Castracane degli Antelminelli (1844)
- Archbishop Paul Cullen (1850)
- Archbishop Joseph Dixon (1852)
- Archbishop Daniel McGettigan (1856)
- Archbishop Michael Logue (1879)
- Bishop Patrick Joseph O'Donnell (1888)
- Bishop John Gerald Neville, C.S.Sp. (1913)
- Bishop Auguste Julien Pierre Fortineau, C.S.Sp. (1915)
- Archbishop Xavier Ferdinand J. Thoyer, S.J. (1937)
- Archbishop Gilbert Ramanantoanina, S.J. (1960)
- Cardinal Victor Razafimahatratra, S.J. (1971)
- Archbishop Philibert Randriambololona, S.J. (1988)
- Bishop Donald Joseph Leo Pelletier, M.S. (2000)
