= Amboangibe =

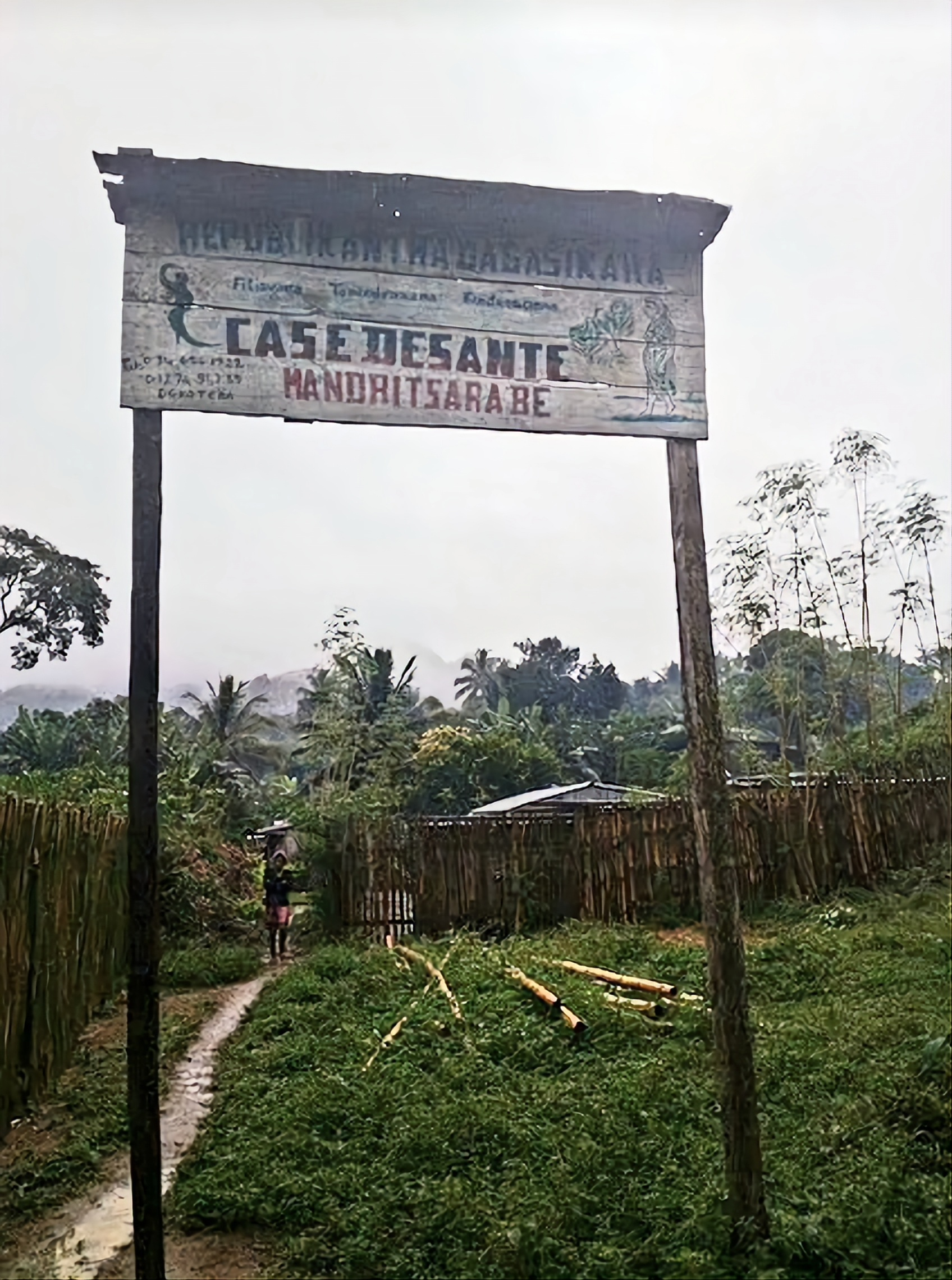
- The health center of Manddritsarabe (municipality of Amboangibe)

- Location in Madagascar
- Coordinates: 14°8′S 49°49′E
- Country: Madagascar
- Region: Sava
- District: Sambava
- Elevation: 90 m (300 ft)

Population (2018)
  - Total: 11 956
- Time zone: UTC3 (EAT)

Amboangibe or Amboahangibe is a town and commune (Malagasy: kaominina) in northern Madagascar. It belongs to the district of Sambava, which is a part of Sava Region. The population of the commune was estimated to be approximately 11.956 in 2018.

Primary and junior level secondary education are available in town. The majority 90% of the population are farmers. The most important crop is vanilla, while other important products are banana and coffee. Services provide employment for 10% of the population.
