= Diocese of Miarinarivo =

Roman Catholic diocese in Madagascar

Diocese of Miarinarivo Dioecesis Miarinarivensis Diôsezin' i Miarinarivo

Location
- Country: Madagascar
- Metropolitan: Archdiocese of Antananarivo
- Headquarters: Miarinarivo, Itasy Region, Madagascar

Statistics
- Area: 1,800 km^{2} (690 sq mi)
- Population: Total; Catholics: (as of 2023); 788,490; 331,395 (42.0%)
- Parishes: 20

Information
- Denomination: Catholic Church
- Sui iuris church: Latin Church
- Rite: Roman Rite
- Established: 13 December 1933; 92 years ago
- Secular priests: 76 (64 Diocesan, 12 Religious Orders)

Current leadership
- Pope: Leo XIV
- Bishop: Jean Claude Rakotoarisoa
- Bishops emeritus: Jean Claude Randrianarisoa

The Roman Catholic Diocese of Miarinarivo (Latin: Miarinariven(sis)) is a diocese located in the city of Miarinarivo in the ecclesiastical province of Antananarivo in Madagascar.

== History ==
- 13 December 1933: Established as Mission “sui iuris” of Miarinarivo
- 25 May 1939: Promoted as Apostolic Vicariate of Miarinarivo
- 14 September 1955: Promoted as Diocese of Miarinarivo

== Bishops ==
Vicar Apostolic of Miarinarivo (Roman rite)

- Ignazio Ramarosandratana (25 May 1939 – 14 September 1955 see below)

Bishops of Miarinarivo (Roman rite)

- Ignazio Ramarosandratana (see above 14 September 1955 – 1 September 1957)
- Édouard Ranaivo (24 June 1958 – 30 April 1959)
- François Xavier Rajaonarivo (5 April 1960 – 15 November 1985)
- Armand Toasy (3 July 1987 – 18 October 1993), appointed Bishop of Port-Bergé
  - Apostolic Administrator Armand Gaétan Razafindratandra (25 June 1994 – 17 May 1998), Archbishop of Antananarivo, Cardinal-Priest of San Martino ai Monti
- Raymond Razakarinvony (14 February 1998 – 15 February 2007), retired
- Jean Claude Randrianarisoa (15 February 2007 – 12 June 2023), resigned
  - Apostolic Administrator Marie Fabien Raharilamboniaina, O.C.D. (12 June 2023 – 12 May 2024), Bishop of Morondava
- Jean Claude Rakotoarisoa (9 March 2024 – Present)

=== Another priest of this diocese who became bishop ===
- Roger Victor Rakotondrajao (1990-2008), appointed Coadjutor Bishop of Mahajanga in 2008

== See also ==
- Roman Catholicism in Madagascar

== Sources ==
- GCatholic.org
- Catholic Hierarchy
