= Bernard Panafieu =

French Catholic cardinal (1931–2017)

His Eminence Bernard Panafieu
- Cardinal, Archbishop Emeritus of Marseille
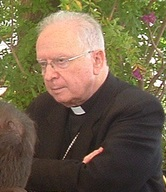
- Cardinal Panafieu at a press conference in 2009
- Church: Roman Catholic
- Archdiocese: Marseille
- Installed: 22 April 1995
- Term ended: 12 May 2006
- Predecessor: Cardinal Robert-Joseph Coffy
- Successor: Georges Pontier
- Other post: Cardinal Priest of San Gregorio Barbarigo alle Tre Fontane

Orders
- Ordination: 22 April 1956
- Consecration: 9 June 1974
- Created cardinal: 21 October 2003 by Pope John Paul II
- Rank: Cardinal

Personal details
- Born: Bernard Louis Auguste Paul Panafieu; 26 January 1931 Châtellerault, France
- Died: 12 November 2017 (aged 86) Carpentras, France
- Motto: Parare Viam Domini ("Prepare the Way of the Lord")
- Coat of arms

Styles of Bernard Panafieu
- Reference style: His Eminence
- Spoken style: Your Eminence
- Informal style: Cardinal
- See: Marseille

Bernard Louis Auguste Paul Panafieu (French: [bɛʁnaʁ panafjø]; 26 January 1931 – 12 November 2017) was a French prelate of the Catholic Church. He was Archbishop of Marseille from 1995 until his retirement in 2006 in Venasque. He was made a cardinal by Pope John Paul II in 2003.

== Biography ==
Panafieu was born on 26 January 1931 in Châtellerault and ordained on 22 April 1956 for the archdiocese of Albi, where he served as a vicar and chaplain of the lyceum La Pérouse. He was also the chaplain of the university parish, chaplain of students in Toulouse, 1967–1970 and secretary general of the presbyteral council from 1973 to 1974.

He was appointed titular bishop of Thibilis and auxiliary bishop of Annecy on 18 April 1974 and consecrated bishop on 9 June by Claude Dupuy, Archbishop of Albi. He was named Archbishop of Aix by Pope Paul VI on 30 November 1978. He was named coadjutor bishop of Marseille on 24 August 1994 and became archbishop there on 22 April 1995. He served as the first metropolitan archbishop when Marseille was elevated to that status on 16 December 2002.

In the Episcopal Conference of France he served as President of the Episcopal Committee for Inter-religious Relations and New Religious Trends, President of the Secretariat for Religious Relations with Islam, and a member of the Episcopal Commission for the Universal Mission of the Church.

He was created Cardinal-Priest of San Gregorio Barbarigo alle Tre Fontane in the consistory of 2003 by Pope John Paul II. He was one of the cardinal electors who participated in the 2005 papal conclave that elected Pope Benedict XVI. Pope Benedict accepted his resignation on 12 May 2006 and Panafieu retired to Vaucluse. He died after an illness of several years in a hospital in Carpentras on 12 November 2017, aged 86.

== Honors and awards ==
- Commandeur of the Order of the Legion of Honour
- Order of the Holy Sepulchre (Catholic)
