= Albert Joseph Tsiahoana =

Albert Joseph Tsiahoana (3 August 1927 – 15 June 2012) was the Catholic archbishop of the Archdiocese of Antsiranana, Madagascar.

Ordained to the priesthood in 1956, he became a bishop in 1964; he resigned in 1998.
