= Roman Catholic Archdiocese of Antsiranana =

Roman Catholic archdiocese in Madagascar

Coordinates: 12.2746°S 49.2936°E

Archdiocese of Antsiranana Archidioecesis Antsirananensis

Location
- Country: Madagascar
- Ecclesiastical province: Antsiranana

Statistics
- Area: 37,924 km^{2} (14,643 sq mi)
- Population: Total; Catholics: (as of 2014); 1,573,833; 662,873 (42.1%)
- Parishes: 26

Information
- Denomination: Roman Catholic
- Rite: Roman rite
- Established: 16 January 1896
- Cathedral: Cathedral of the Sacred Heart of Jesus

Current leadership
- Pope: Leo XIV
- Metropolitan Archbishop: Benjamin Marc Balthason RamarosonC.M.

There is also an Anglican Bishop of Antsiranana in the Church of the Province of the Indian Ocean.

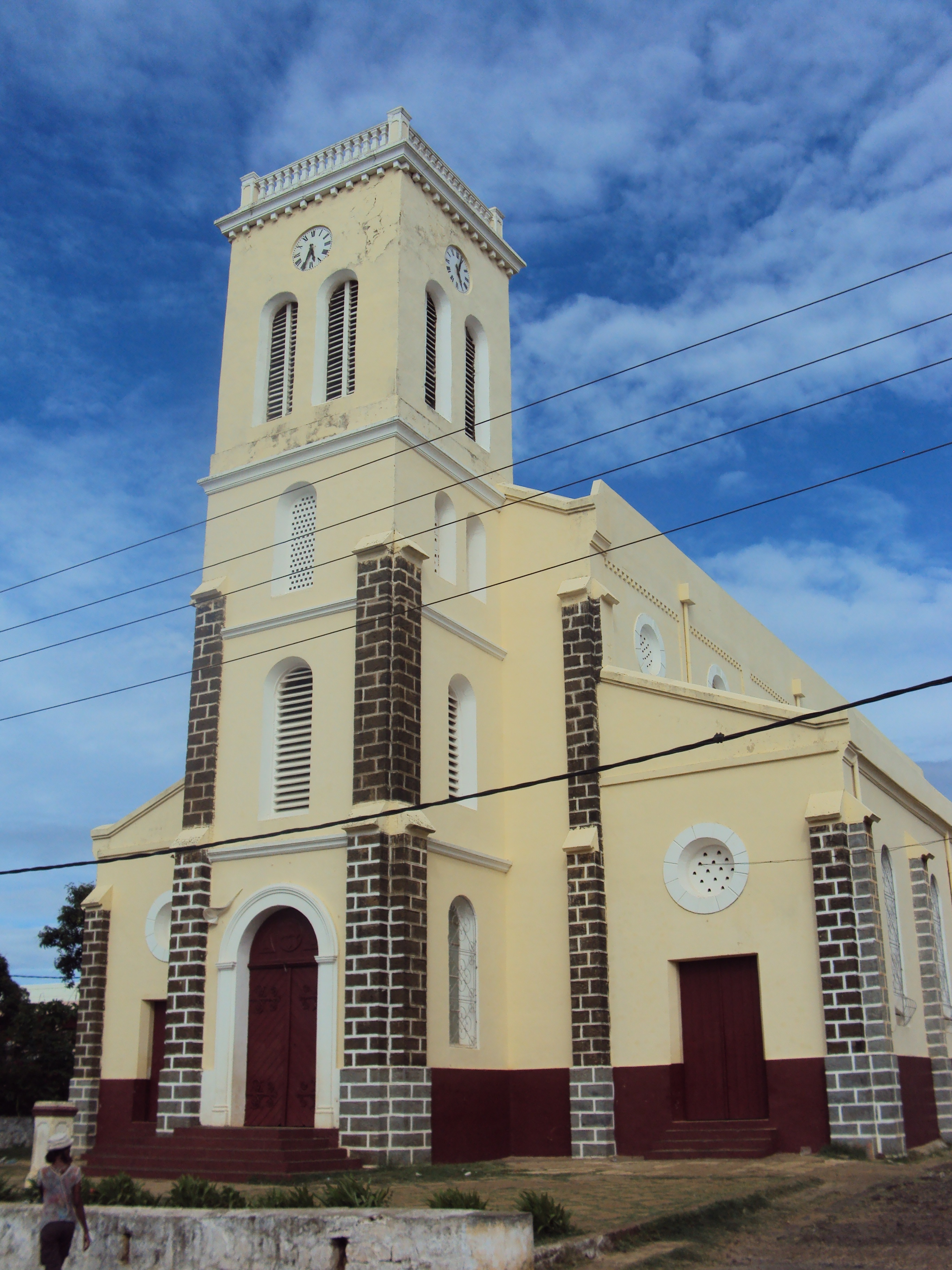
Cathedral of Antsiranana

The Roman Catholic Archdiocese of Antsiranana is one of five Metropolitan Latin Archdioceses in Madagascar. Although it has its ecclesiastical province, it remains subject to the missionary Roman Congregation for the Evangelization of Peoples.

Its cathedral archiepiscopal see is Cathedral of the Sacred Heart of Jesus, dedicated to the Sacred Heart of Jesus, in Antsiranana.

== History ==
It was established on 16 January 1896 as Apostolic Vicariate of Northern Madagascar, on territory split off from the then Apostolic Vicariate of Madagascar (now Metropolitan Archbishopric of Antananarivo)

On 20 May 1913 it was renamed after its see as Apostolic Vicariate of Diégo-Suarez. On 15 March 1923 it lost territory to establish the then Apostolic Vicariate of Majunga On 14 September 1955 it was promoted as Diocese of Diégo-Suarez

Promoted on 11 December 1958 as Metropolitan Archdiocese of Diégo-Suarez, during the transition from French colony to independence. On 21 May 1959 it lost territory to establish the Diocese of Ambatondrazaka. It enjoyed a Papal visit by Pope John Paul II in April 1989.

Renamed on 28 October 1989 as Metropolitan Archdiocese of Antsiranana. On 30 October 2000 it lost further territory to establish the Diocese of Fenoarivo Atsinanana.

== Ecclesiastical province ==
The Metropolitan Archdiocese of Antsiranana has the following suffragan sees :

- Roman Catholic Diocese of Ambanja
- Roman Catholic Diocese of Mahajanga
- Roman Catholic Diocese of Port-Bergé

== Statistics ==
As per 2014, it pastorally served 662,873 Catholics (42.1% of 1,573,833 total) on 37,924 km^{2} in 26 parishes with 65 priests (51 diocesan, 14 religious), 194 lay religious (42 brothers, 152 sisters) and 54 seminarians.

It had a total population of about 2,211,890 in 2004. About 15.5% of the residents were Catholic. 46 Priests operated in the Archdiocese, making for a ratio of 7,464 Catholics per Priest. The Archbishop as of November 2013 is Benjamin Marc Ramaroson.

== Episcopal ordinaries ==
(all Roman rite)

Apostolic Vicar of North Madagascar

- François-Xavier Corbet Holy Ghost Fathers (C.S.Sp.), (5 July 1898 – 20 May 1913 see below), Titular Bishop of Obba (5 July 1898 – death 25 July 1914)

Apostolic vicars of Diego Suarez

- François-Xavier Corbet (C.S.Sp.), (see above 20 May 1913 – death 25 July 1914)
- Auguste Julien Pierre Fortineau (C.S.Sp.), (25 July 1914 – retired 1946.04), Titular Bishop of Chytri (17 July 1914 – death 9 February 1948), succeeding as former Coadjutor Vicar Apostolic of Diégo-Suarez (17 July 1914 – 25 July 1914)
- Edmond-Marie-Jean Wolff (C.S.Sp.), (11 December 1958 – 13 April 1967 see below), Titular Bishop of Phatanus (8 July 1941 – 14 September 1955), previously Apostolic Vicar of Majunga (Madagascar) (8 July 1941 – 13 February 1947)

Suffragan bishop of Diego Suarez

- Edmond-Marie-Jean Wolff (C.S.Sp.), (see above 14 September 1955 – 11 December 1958 see below)

Metropolitan archbishops of Diego Suarez

- Edmond-Marie-Jean Wolff (C.S.Sp.), (11 December 1958 – retired 13 April 1967), emeritate as Titular Archbishop of Gummi in Byzacena (13 April 1967 – resigned 24 May 1971), died 1990
- Albert Joseph Tsiahoana, (13 April 1967 – 28 October 1989 see below); succeeding as former auxiliary bishop of Diégo-Suarez (Madagascar) (10 February 1964 – 13 April 1967) and Titular Bishop of Abthugni (10 February 1964 – 13 April 1967)

Metropolitan archbishops of Antsiranana

- Albert Joseph Tsiahoana, (28 October 1989 – 14 November 1998), died 2012
- Michel Malo, Association of Priests of Prado (Ist. del Prado) (28 November 1998 – retired 27 November 2013); previously Titular Bishop of Croæ (1 September 1988 – 29 March 1996), first as Auxiliary Bishop of Mahajanga (Madagascar) (1 September 1988 – 18 October 1993) and next Auxiliary Bishop of Antsiranana (18 October 1993 – 29 March 1996), next Bishop of Mahajanga (Madagascar) (29 March 1996 – 28 November 1998)
- Benjamin Marc Ramaroson, (27 November 2013 - ...), previously Bishop of Farafangana (Madagascar) (26 November 2005 – 27 November 2013).

== See also ==
- List of Catholic dioceses in Madagascar
- Catholic Church in Madagascar

== Sources and external links ==
- GCatholic with Google satellite photo - data for all sections
- Catholic-hierarchy.org
