= Jérôme Rakotomalala =

Malagasy Cardinal

His Eminence Jérôme Rakotomalala
- Archbishop of Tananarive
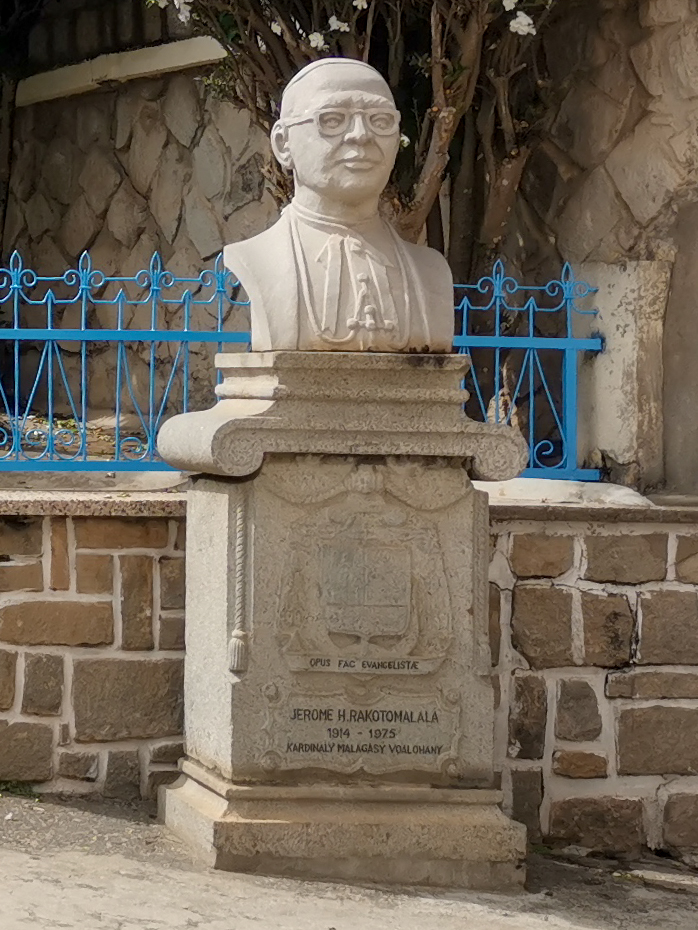
- Church: Roman Catholic Church
- Appointed: 5 April 1960
- Term ended: 1 November 1975
- Predecessor: Victor Sartre
- Successor: Victor Razafimahatratra
- Other post: Cardinal-Priest of Santa Maria Consolatrice al Tiburtino (1969-75)

Orders
- Ordination: 31 July 1943
- Consecration: 8 May 1960 by Pope John XXIII
- Created cardinal: 28 April 1969 by Pope Paul VI
- Rank: Cardinal-Priest

Personal details
- Born: Jérôme Louis Rakotomalala; 15 July 1914 Île Sainte-Marie, Madagascar
- Died: 1 November 1975 (aged 61) Antananarivo, Madagascar
- Motto: Opus fac evangelistae

Styles of Jérôme Rakotomalala
- Reference style: His Eminence
- Spoken style: Your Eminence
- Informal style: Cardinal
- See: Tananarive

Jérôme Louis Rakotomalala (15 July 1914 – 1 November 1975) was a Malagasy Cardinal of the Roman Catholic Church. He served as Archbishop of Tananarive from 1960 until his death, and was elevated to the cardinalate in 1969.

== Biography ==
Jérôme Rakotomalala was born in Sainte-Marie, and studied at the Regional Seminary of Ambotaraka. He was ordained to the priesthood on 31 July 1943 and then did pastoral work in Tananarive until 1946. He served as a professor at the Ambotaraka seminary, director of Saint Peter Canisius School, and vicar general of Tananarive from 1946 to 1960.

On 4 April 1960 Rakotomalala was appointed Archbishop of Tananarive by Pope John XXIII. He received his episcopal consecration on the following 8 May from Pope John himself, with Bishops Napoléon-Alexandre Labrie, CIM and Fulton J. Sheen serving as co-consecrators, in St. Peter's Basilica. Rakotomalala later attended the Second Vatican Council from 1962 to 1965, and sat on the council's Central Preparatory Commission.

Pope Paul VI created him Cardinal Priest of S. Marie Consolatrice al Tiburtino in the consistory of 28 April 1969. Rakotomalala was the first cardinal to hail from Madagascar as well.

The Cardinal died in Tananarive, at the age of 62. He is buried in the metropolitan cathedral of Tananarive, now called Antananarivo.

== See also ==
- Catholic Church in Madagascar

Catholic Church titles
Preceded by Victor Sartre, SJ	Archbishop of Tananarive; 1960–1975	Succeeded by Victor Razafimahatratra, SJ
