= Diocese of Moramanga =

Roman Catholic diocese in Madagascar

The (Roman Catholic) Diocese of Moramanga (Dioecesis Moramanganus) is located in the east of Madagascar. It is a suffragan diocese of the Ecclesiastical Province of the Archdiocese of Toamasina.

The diocese was created on May 13, 2006, by splitting off the territory from the diocese of Ambatondrazaka. As its first bishop Gaetano Di Pierro S.C.I. was selected, who was previously auxiliary bishop of Ambatondrazaka. The cathedral of the diocese is the Sacred Heart of Jesus church in Moramanga.

The diocese covers an area of 12,064 km^{2}, and borders the diocese of Ambatondrazaka to the north, the archdiocese of Toamasina to the east and south, and the archdiocese of Antananarivo to the west. It is subdivided into 3 parishes. 110,000 of the 348,000 people in the area belong to the Catholic Church.

== Ordinaries ==
- Gaetano Di Pierro, S.C.I. (13 May 2006 - 3 Mar 2018), appointed Bishop of Farafangana
- Rosario Saro Vella, S.D.B. (8 Jul 2019 - )

== See also ==
- Catholic Church in Madagascar
