= Benjamin Marc Ramaroson =

The Most Reverend Benjamin Marc Ramaroson C.M.
- Archbishop of Antsiranana
- Church: Roman Catholic Church
- Archdiocese: Antsiranana
- See: Antsiranana
- Appointed: 27 November 2013
- Installed: 25 January 2014
- Predecessor: Michel Malo
- Previous post: Bishop of Farafangana (2005-13)

Orders
- Ordination: 15 August 1984
- Consecration: 25 March 2006 by Fulgence Rabemahafaly

Personal details
- Born: Benjamin Marc Balthason Ramaroson; 25 April 1955 (age 71) Manakara, Madagascar
- Motto: Tsy isika fa ny fahasoavan' andriamanitra miaraka amintsika

Benjamin Marc Balthason Ramaroson, C.M. (born 25 April 1955 in Manakara) is Archbishop of the Roman Catholic Archdiocese of Antsiranana in Madagascar.

== Biography ==
Ramaroson was ordained as a priest on 15 August 1984 for the Congregation of the Mission. He was appointed as bishop of the Roman Catholic Diocese of Farafangana by Pope Benedict XVI and consecrated in November 2005. As was appointed Archbishop of Antsiranana in November 2013 upon the retirement of Archbishop Michel Melo.
