= Diocese of Ambatondrazaka =

Roman Catholic diocese in Madagascar

Coordinates: 17.8205°S 48.4204°E

Diocese of Ambatondrazaka Dioecesis Ambatondrazakaënsis

Location
- Country: Madagascar
- Metropolitan: Toamasina

Statistics
- Area: 21,436 km^{2} (8,276 sq mi)
- Population: Total; Catholics: (as of 2006); 1,151,830; 220,000 (19.1%)

Information
- Rite: Latin Rite

Current leadership
- Pope: Leo XIV
- Bishop elect: Orthasie Marcellin Herivonjilalaina

The Roman Catholic Diocese of Ambatondrazaka (Latin: Ambatondrazakaën(sis)) is a diocese located in the city of Ambatondrazaka, Madagascar, in the ecclesiastical province of the Roman Catholic Archdiocese of Toamasina (in Toamasina, Madagascar).

== History ==
- May 21, 1959: Established as Diocese of Ambatondrazaka from the Metropolitan Archdiocese of Diégo-Suarez and Metropolitan Archdiocese of Tananarive

== Leadership ==
Bishops of Ambatondrazaka

- François Vòllaro, O.SS.T. (1959.12.19 – 1993.03.06)
- Antoine Scopelliti, O.SS.T. (1993.03.06 - 2015.04.11)
- Jean de Dieu Raoelison (11 April 2015 – 5 June 2023)
- Orthasie Marcellin Herivonjilalaina

=== Coadjutor Bishops ===
- Antoine Scopelliti, O.SS.T. (1991-1993)

=== Auxiliary Bishop ===
- Gaetano Di Pierro, S.C.I. (2001-2006), appointed Bishop of Moramanga

== See also ==
- Roman Catholicism in Madagascar
- List of Roman Catholic dioceses in Madagascar

== Sources ==
- GCatholic.org
- Catholic Hierarchy
