= Archdiocese of Toliara =

Roman Catholic archdiocese in Madagascar

Coordinates: 23°20′46″S 43°40′00″E

Archdiocese of Toliara Archidioecesis Toliarana
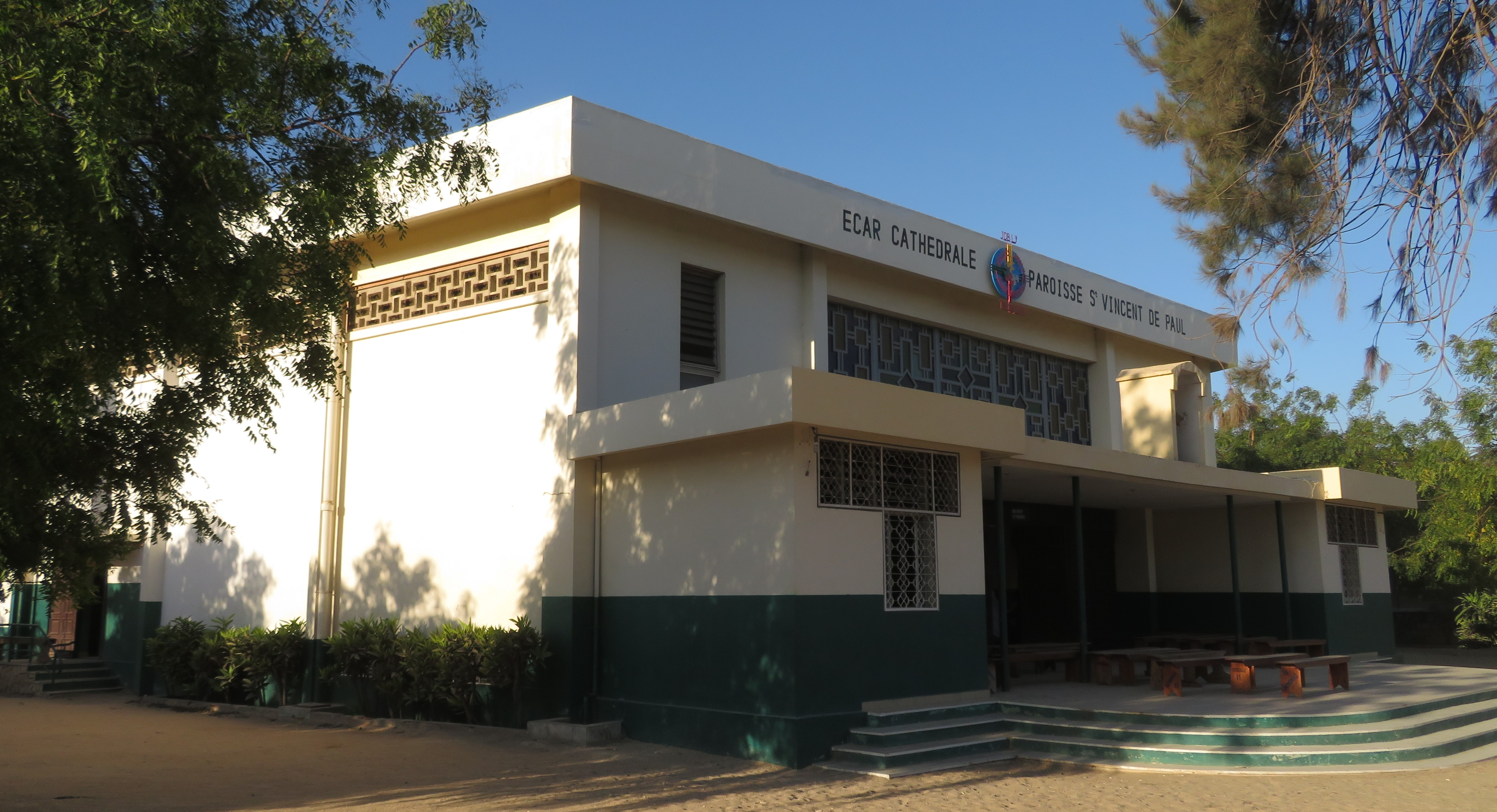
- Toliara Cathedral

Location
- Country: Madagascar
- Headquarters: Toliara, Atsimo-Andrefana, Madagascar

Statistics
- Area: 43,570 km^{2} (16,820 sq mi)
- Population: Total; Catholics: (as of 2022); 1,312,000; 187,000 (14.3%)
- Parishes: 28

Information
- Denomination: Roman Catholic
- Sui iuris church: Latin Church
- Rite: Roman Rite
- Established: 8 April 1957; 69 years ago
- Cathedral: Cathedral of St. Vincent de Paul
- Secular priests: 75

Current leadership
- Pope: Leo XIV
- Metropolitan Archbishop: Gustavo Bombín Espino, O.Ss.T.
- Bishops emeritus: Fulgence Rabeony S.J.

The Roman Catholic Archdiocese of Toliara (Latin: Toliarana) is one of five Metropolitan archdioceses with an Ecclesiastical province in Madagascar, yet depends on the missionary Roman Congregation for the Evangelization of Peoples.

Its cathedral archiepiscopal see is in Toliara (formerly Tuléar).

== Ecclesiastical province ==
Its Suffragan sees are :

- Roman Catholic Diocese of Morombe
- Roman Catholic Diocese of Morondava
- Roman Catholic Diocese of Tôlagnaro

== Statistics ==
As per 2014, it pastorally served 119,638 Catholics (11.8% of 1,014,000 total) on 43,570 km^{2} in 23 parishes and 1 mission with 63 priests (26 diocesan, 37 religious), 373 lay religious (68 brothers, 305 sisters) and 18 seminarians.

== History ==
- Established 8 April 1957 as Diocese of Tuléar, on territty split off from the Diocese of Fort-Dauphin
- Renamed 28 October 1989 like its see as Diocese of Toliara
- Promoted 3 December 2003 as Metropolitan Archdiocese of Toliara

== Bishops ==
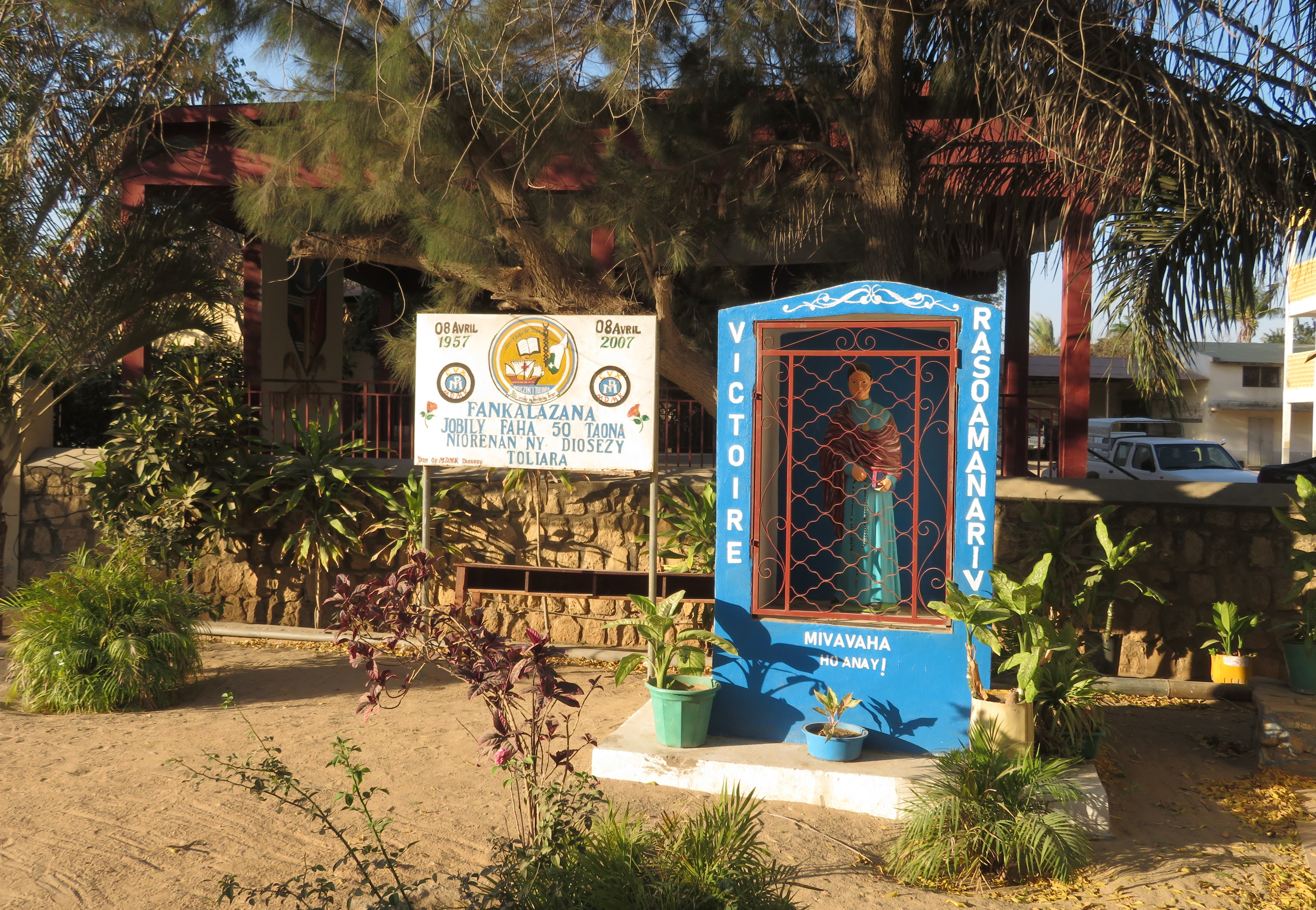
Monument of the foundation of the diocesis

=== Ordinaries ===
(all Roman rite)

Suffragan Bishops of Tuléar

- Michel-Henri Canonne, A.A. (25 April 1959 – 28 February 1974), retired
- René Joseph Rakotondrabé (28 February 1974 – 15 May 1989), appointed Bishop of Tamatave

Suffragan Bishops of Toliara

- Fulgence Rabeony, S.J. (2 April 1990 – 3 December 2003 see below)

Metropolitan Archbishops of Toliara

- Fulgence Rabeony, S.J. (see above 3 December 2003 – 22 July 2023), retired
  - Apostolic Administrator Fulgence Rabeony, S.J. (22 July 2023 – 1 October 2023)
- Gustavo Bombín Espino, O.Ss.T. (22 July 2023 – Present)

=== Auxiliary Bishop ===
- René Joseph Rakotondrabé (1972-1974), appointed Bishop here

== See also ==
- List of Roman Catholic dioceses in Madagascar
- Catholic Church in Madagascar

== Sources and external links ==
- GCatholic.org, with Google satellite photo
