= Roman Catholic Diocese of Farafangana =

Roman Catholic diocese in Madagascar

Coordinates: 22.8210°S 47.8331°E

Diocese of Farafangana Dioecesis Farafanganensis Diôsezin' i Farafangana

Location
- Country: Madagascar
- Metropolitan: Archdiocese of Fianarantsoa
- Headquarters: Farafangana, Atsimo-Atsinanana, Madagascar

Statistics
- Area: 23,176 km^{2} (8,948 sq mi)
- Population: Total; Catholics: (as of 2023); 1,583,300; 231,580 (14.6%)
- Parishes: 29

Information
- Denomination: Catholic Church
- Sui iuris church: Latin Church
- Rite: Roman Rite
- Established: 8 April 1957; 69 years ago
- Cathedral: Cathédrale du Sacré-Cœur-de-Jésus in Farafangana
- Secular priests: 50 (16 Diocesan, 34 Religious Orders)

Current leadership
- Pope: Leo XIV
- Bishop: Marcellin Randriamamonjy
- Metropolitan Archbishop: Fulgence Rabemahafaly
- Bishops emeritus: Gaetano Di Pierro, S.C.I.

The Diocese of Farafangana is a Roman Catholic Diocese under the Archdiocese of Fianarantsoa in Madagascar. It is based in the town of Farafangana and was erected on 8 April 1957. It performs the Latin Rite. The Diocese covers approximately 23,176 km (14,401 mi). As of 2023, the diocese population was about 1,583,300, with 14.6% Catholic. 50 priests were in the Diocese for a ratio of 4,631 Catholics for every 1 Priest.

== Leadership ==
Bishops of Farafangana (Roman Rite)

- Camille-Antoine Chilouet, C.M. (24 December 1957 – 25 November 1970)
- Victor Razafimahatratra, S.J. (16 January 1971 – 10 April 1976), appointed Archbishop of Tananarive
- Charles-Remy Rakotonirina, S.J. (28 October 1976 – 6 August 2005)
- Benjamin Marc Balthason Ramaroson, C.M. (26 November 2005 – 27 November 2013), appointed Archbishop of Antsiranana
  - Apostolic Administrator José Alfredo Caires de Nobrega, S.C.I. (16 January 2014 – 12 April 2018), Bishop of Mananjary
- Gaetano Di Pierro, S.C.I. (3 March 2018 – 31 October 2024), retired
  - Apostolic Administrator Gaetano Di Pierro, S.C.I. (31 October 2024 – 5 January 2025)
- Marcellin Randriamamonjy (31 October 2024 – Present)

== See also ==
- Catholic Church in Madagascar
