= Armand Razafindratandra =

20th and 21st-century Catholic cardinal and archbishop

His Eminence Armand Gaétan Razafindratandra
- Archbishop emeritus of Antananarivo
- See: Roman Catholic Archdiocese of Antananarivo
- Appointed: 1994
- Term ended: 7 December 2005
- Predecessor: Victor Razafimahatratra
- Successor: Odon Marie Arsène Razanakolona

Orders
- Ordination: 27 July 1954
- Consecration: 2 July 1978 by Victor Razafimahatratra

Personal details
- Born: 7 August 1925 Ambohimalaza, Madagascar
- Died: 9 January 2010 (aged 84) Majunga, Madagascar
- Buried: Mahajanga Cathedral, Majunga
- Denomination: Roman Catholic
- Education: St. Michael's College
- Motto: Ut omnes unum sint

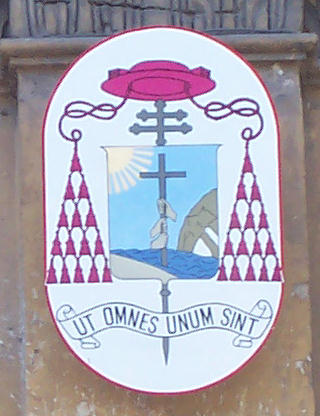
Coat of arms of Cardinal Razafindratandra, bearing the motto Ut omnes unum sint ("That all may be one"). From the basilica of San Martino ai Monti, Rome.

Armand Gaétan Razafindratandra (7 August 1925 – 9 January 2010) was a Malagasy prelate of the Catholic Church who served as Archbishop of Antananarivo from 1994 to 2005.

== Life ==
Born in Ambohimalaza, near Antananarivo, where his grandfather had been governor, Razafindratandra was educated at the parish school of Faravohitra. He went on to study at the minor seminary of Ambohipo and then at St. Michael's College, a Jesuit institution, before studying philosophy and theology at Ambatoroka.

Razafindratandra was ordained a priest in 1954, after which he studied at the Catholic Institute in Paris for two years. Returning to Madagascar in 1956, he directed catechetical teaching and spiritual programs for public and private schools, working extensively with youth summer camp programs for children from needy families. He also rose to become Rector of the minor seminary at Faliarivo and the Director of the major seminary at Ambatoroka.

Appointed Bishop of Mahajanga in 1978 and named Archbishop of the Antananarivo Archdiocese in 1994, Razafindratandra was created a cardinal by Pope John Paul II in the consistory of 26 November 1994, and became the cardinal-priest of San Martino ai Monti.

From 1997 to 2002, he was president of the Episcopal Conference of Madagascar. Razafindratandra was one of the cardinal electors who participated in the 2005 papal conclave that selected Pope Benedict XVI.

Armand Razafindratandra died on 9 January 2010.

== See also ==
- Catholic Church in Madagascar
