= Archdiocese of Antananarivo =

Latin Catholic archdiocese in Madagascar

Coordinates: 18°55′04″S 47°31′50″E

Archdiocese of Antananarivo Archidioecesis Antananarivensis
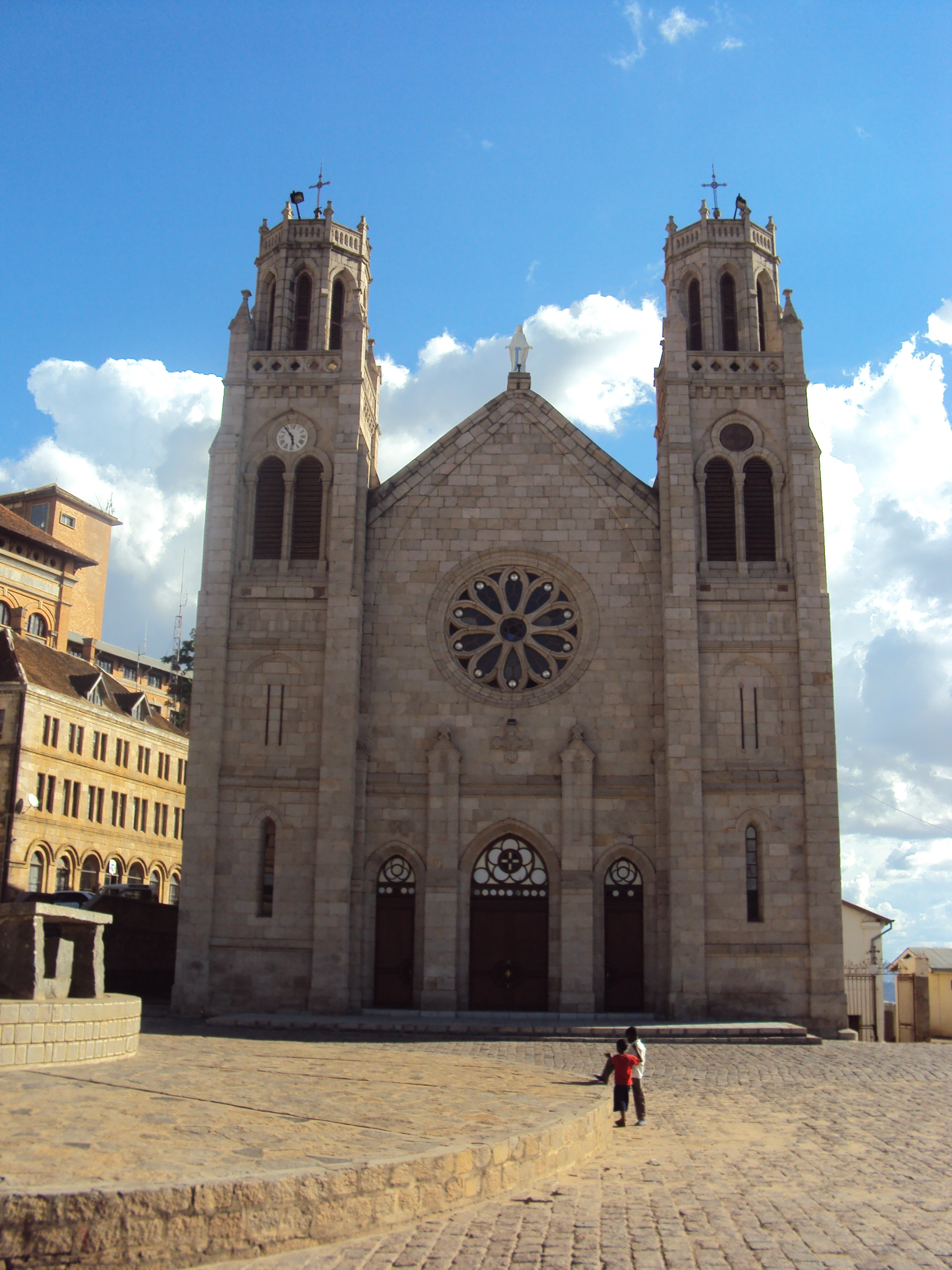
- Cathedral of the Immaculate Conception

Location
- Country: Madagascar
- Ecclesiastical province: Antananarivo

Statistics
- Area: 2,465 sq mi (6,380 km^{2})
- Population: Total; Catholics: (as of 2014); 3,550,000; 957,000 (27%)

Information
- Denomination: Catholic Church
- Sui iuris church: Latin Church
- Rite: Roman Rite
- Established: December 1841
- Cathedral: Cathedral of the Immaculate Conception

Current leadership
- Pope: Leo XIV
- Archbishop: Jean De Dieu Raoelison
- Auxiliary Bishops: Jean Pascal Andriantsoavina; Mamiarisoa Modeste Randrianifahanana
- Bishops emeritus: Odon Marie Arsène Razanakolona

The Archdiocese of Antananarivo is one of five Latin Church metropolitan archdioceses in Madagascar.

Its cathedral episcopal see is the Cathédrale de l'Immaculée Conception, dedicated to the Immaculate Conception, in Andohalo, in the national capital city of Antananarivo.

The archdiocese was, for many years, one of the bases for the spreading of Catholicism in Madagascar and the surrounding British and especially French Indian Ocean territories like Réunion, Comoros and others, which now form an Indian Ocean Episcopal Conference.

== Statistics ==
As of 2014, it pastorally served 957,000 Catholics (27.0% of 3,550,000 total) on 12,500 km^{2} in 77 parishes and 22 missions with 356 priests (160 diocesan, 196 religious), 2,333 lay religious (568 brothers, 1,765 sisters) and 131 seminarians.

The archdiocese had a total population of about 2,1816,7149 in 2004, with about 27.1% of the residents being Catholic; 277 Priests operated in the Archdiocese, making for a ratio of 2,750 Catholics per priest.

== Ecclesiastical province ==
The suffragan dioceses and the bishops in the ecclesiastical province of Antananrivo headed by the Metropolitan Archbishop of Antananrivo are (2017):

- Antsirabe - Philippe Ranaivomanana
- Maintirano (since 2017) - Gustavo Bombin Espino, O.SS.T.
- Miarinarivo - Jean Claude Randrianarisoa
- Tsiroanomandidy - Gabriel Randrianantenaina

== History ==
- What is now the Archdiocese of Antananarivo was founded as the Apostolic Prefecture of Madagascar in 1841, on territory split off from the Diocese of Saint-Denis-de-La Réunion in La Réunion. It was influential in the spreading of Christianity on Madagascar, despite what became known as "ny tany maizina", or "the time when the land was dark." It was a time of absolute persecution of any Malagasy that converted to Christianity and it is estimated that 150,000 Christians died then.
- In 1848, it was promoted to the Apostolic Vicariate of Madagascar, hence entitled to a titular bishop, having lost insular Indian Ocean territory on 1848.09.04 to establish the Apostolic Prefecture of Mayotte, Nossi-Bé and Comoro.

On 1896.01.16 it lost Malagassy (Malgache) territory to establish the then Apostolic Vicariate of Northern Madagascar and then Apostolic Vicariate of Southern Madagascar (now Metropolitan Archdioceses). In 1898 it was accordingly renamed itself as the Apostolic Vicariate of Central Madagascar (Madagascar Centrale).

On 20 May 1913, it was renamed after its see as the Apostolic Vicariate of Tananarive.

It lost more Malagassy territory on Madagascar thrice more : on 1933.12.13 to establish the Mission sui juris of Miarinarivo, on 1935.06.18 to establish the then Apostolic Prefecture of Vatomandry and on 1938.01.08 to establish the then Apostolic Prefecture of Morondava.

- On 1955.09.14 it was promoted as Metropolitan Archdiocese of Tananarive / Tananariven(sis) (Latin)

On 1959.05.21 it again lost Malagassy territory to establish the Diocese of Ambatondrazaka.

- On 1989.10.28 it was renamed, with its see, as Metropolitan Archdiocese of Antananarivo.

== Ordinaries ==
Until World War II its ordinaries were generally French missionaries of Latin congregations.

Apostolic Prefects of Madagascar

- Father Jean-Pierre Dalmond, C.S.Sp. (1841.12 – death 1847.09.22)

Apostolic Vicars of Madagascar

- Alexandre-Hippolyte-Xavier Monnet, C.S.Sp. (1848.10.03 – death 1849.12.01), Titular Bishop of Pella (1848.10.03 – 1849.12.01); previously Superior General of the Congregation of the Holy Spirit (Spiritans, Holy Ghost Fathers) (1848.03.02 – 1848.10.03)

Apostolic Vicars of Central Madagascar

- Jean-Baptiste Cazet (1885.05.05 – retired 1911.08.30), Titular Bishop of Sozusa (in Palaestina) (1885.05.05 – death 1918.03.06)
- Henri de Lespinasse de Saune, S.J. (1911.08.30 – 1913.05.20), Titular Bishop of Rhizæum (1899.11.22 – death 1929.08.07), succeeding as former Coadjutor Vicar Apostolic of Central Madagascar (1899.11.22 – 1911.08.30)

Apostolic Vicars of Tananarive

- Henri de Lespinasse de Saune, S.J. (1913.05.20 – retired 1927.03.07)
- Étienne Fourcadier (1928.02.15 – retired 1947.04.22), Titular Bishop of Hippo Diarrhytus (1928.02.18 – death 1948.05.02)
- Victor Sartre, S.J. (1948.03.11 – 1955.09.14), Titular Bishop of Vaga (1948.03.11 – 1955.09.14)

Metropolitan Archbishops of Tananarive

- Victor Sartre, S.J. (1955.09.14 – retired 1960.01.12), emeritus as Titular Archbishop of Beroë (1960.01.12 – death 2000.10.13)
- Jérôme Rakotomalala (first native incumbent) (1960.04.04 – death 1975.11.01), also President of Episcopal Conference of Madagascar (1965 – 1966), created Cardinal-Priest of S. Maria Consolatrice al Tiburtino (1969.04.30 – 1975.11.01)
  - Auxiliary Bishop Nicolas Ravitarivao (1972.12.18 – death 1989.12.01), Titular Bishop of Arsennaria (1972.12.18 – 1989.12.01)
- Victor Razafimahatratra, S.J. (1976.04.10 – 1989.10.28), previously Bishop of Farafangana (Madagascar) (1971.01.16 – 1976.04.10); also President of Episcopal Conference of Madagascar (1974 – 1986), created Cardinal-Priest of S. Croce in Gerusalemme (1976.05.24 – death 1993.10.06)

Metropolitan Archbishops of Antananarivo

- Victor Razafimahatratra, S.J. (1989.10.28 – death 1993.10.06)
- Armand Gaétan Razafindratandra (1994.02.03 – retired 2005.12.07), previously Bishop of Mahajanga (Madagascar) (1978.04.27 – 1989.10.28), Bishop of Mahajanga (Madagascar) (1989.10.28 – 1994.02.03); created Cardinal-Priest of Ss. Silvestro e Martino ai Monti (1994.11.26 – death 2010.01.09), also President of Episcopal Conference of Madagascar (1996 – 2002)
  - Auxiliary Bishop Joseph Ignace Randrianasolo (1997.10.24 – 1999.06.03), Titular Bishop of Milevum (1997.10.24 – 1999.06.03); later Bishop of Mahajanga (Madagascar) (1999.06.03 – death 2010.02.02)
- Odon Marie Arsène Razanakolona (2005.12.07 – 5 June 2023), previously Bishop of Ambanja (Madagascar) (1998.11.28 – 2005.12.07), a while remaining Apostolic Administrator of Ambanja (2005.12.07 – 2007.11.07)
  - Auxiliary Bishop Jean-Paul Randriamanana (1999.06.03 – death 2011.11.09), Titular Bishop of Paria in Proconsolare (1999.06.03 – 2011.11.09)
  - Auxiliary Bishop Jean de Dieu Raoelison (2010.03.25 – 2015.04.11), Titular Bishop of Corniculana (2010.03.25 – 2015.04.11); later Bishop of Ambatondrazaka (Madagascar) (2015.04.11 – 5 June 2023)
  - Auxiliary Bishop Jean Pascal Andriantsoavina (2019.07.08 - ...), Titular Bishop of Zallata (2019.07.08 - ...)
- Jean De Dieu Raoelison (since 5 June 2023)
  - Auxiliary Bishop Mamiarisoa Modeste Randrianifahanana (since 26 June 2025)

== See also ==
- List of Catholic dioceses in Madagascar
- Catholic Church in Madagascar

== Sources and external links ==
- GCatholic - data for all sections
- Catholic-hierarchy.org profile of the Archdiocese
