= Roman Catholic Diocese of Mahajanga =

Roman Catholic diocese in Madagascar

Diocese of Mahajanga Dioecesis Mahagianganus

Location
- Country: Madagascar
- Metropolitan: Antsiranana

Statistics
- Area: 71,900 km^{2} (27,800 sq mi)
- Population: Total; Catholics: (as of 2004); 992,794; 142,447 (14.3%)

Information
- Rite: Latin Rite

Current leadership
- Pope: Leo XIV
- Bishop: Zygmunt Robaszkiewicz

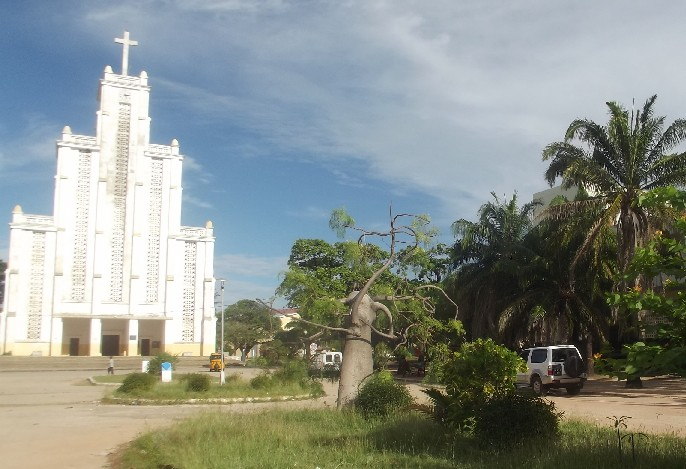

The Roman Catholic Diocese of Mahajanga (Latin: Mahagiangan(us)) is a diocese located in the city of Mahajanga in the ecclesiastical province of Antsiranana in Madagascar.

== History ==
- March 15, 1923: Established as Apostolic Vicariate of Majunga from the Apostolic Vicariate of Diégo-Suarez
- September 14, 1955: Promoted as Diocese of Majunga
- October 28, 1989: Renamed as Diocese of Mahajanga

== Bishops ==
Vicars Apostolic of Majunga

- Paul-Auguste-Marie Pichot, C.S.Sp. (1923.03.16 – 1940.05.10)
- Jean Wolff, C.S.Sp. (1941.07.08 – 1947.02.13)
- Jean Batiot, C.S.Sp. (1947.02.13 – 1953.08.31)
- Jean David, C.S.Sp. (1954.02.22 – 1955.09.14)

Bishops of Majunga

- Jean David, C.S.Sp. (1955.09.14 – 1978.04.27)
- Armand Gaétan Razafindratandra (1978.04.27 – 1989.10.28)

Bishops of Mahajanga

- Armand Gaétan Razafindratandra (1989.10.28 – 1994.02.03)
- Michel Malo, Ist. del Prado (1996.03.29 – 1998.11.28)
- Joseph Ignace Randrianasolo (1999.06.03 – 2010.02.02)
- Roger Victor Rakotondrajao (2010.02.02 – 2018.11.03)
- Zygmunt Robaszkiewicz, M.S.F. (2022.11.19 – present)

=== Coadjutor Bishop ===
- Roger Victor Rakotondrajao (2008 – 2010)

=== Auxiliary Bishops ===
- Michel Malo, Ist. del Prado (1988 – 1993), appointed Auxiliary Bishop of Antsiranana; later returned here as Bishop
- Armand Toasy (1984 – 1987), appointed Bishop of Miarinarivo

== See also ==
- Roman Catholicism in Madagascar

== Sources ==
- GCatholic.org
- Catholic Hierarchy
