= December 1988 =

Month of 1988

<<	December 1988					>>
Su	Mo	Tu	We	Th	Fr	Sa
				1	2	3
4	5	6	7	8	9	10
11	12	13	14	15	16	17
18	19	20	21	22	23	24
25	26	27	28	29	30	31

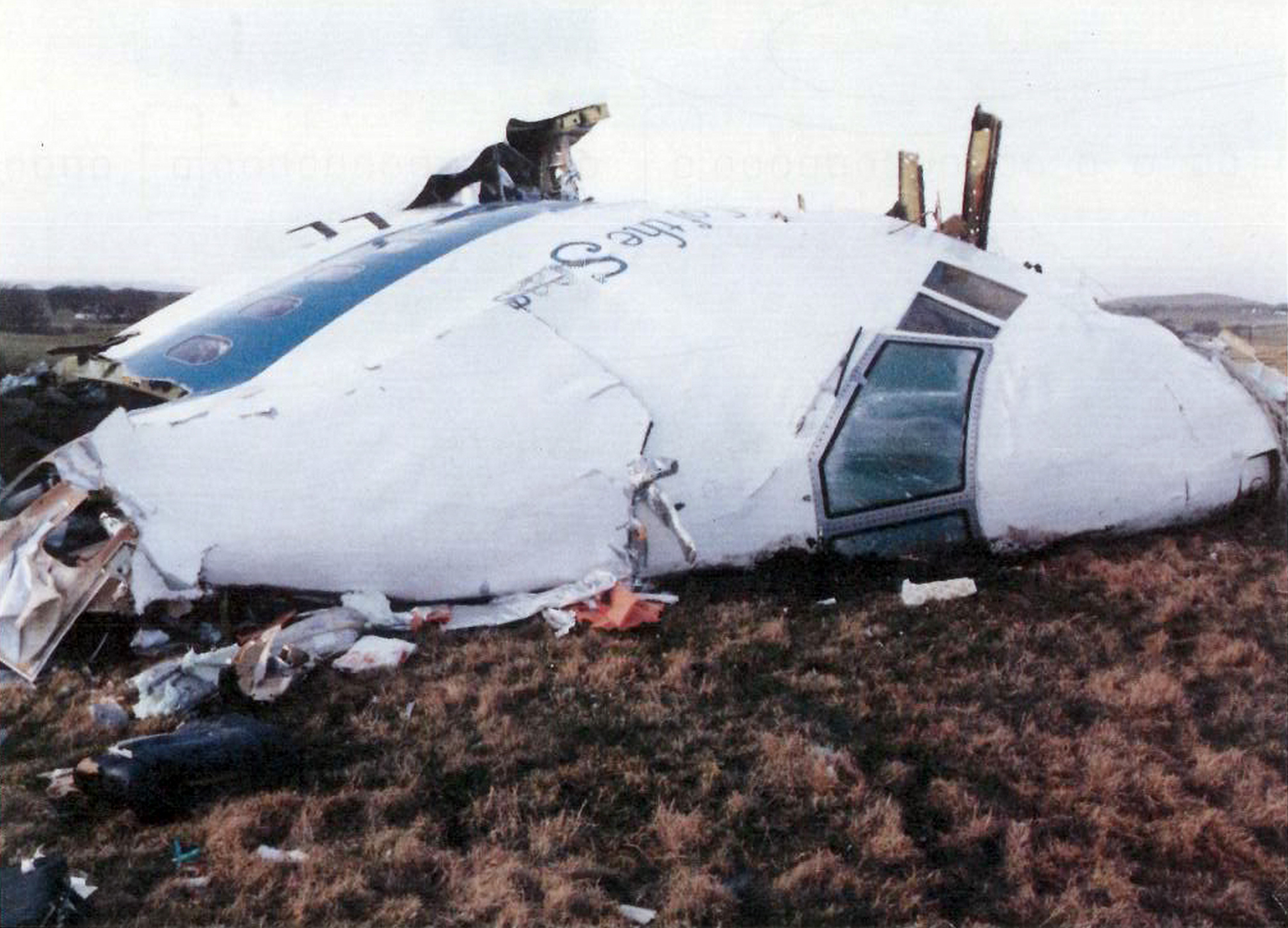
Pan Am Flight 103: Wreckage of the forward section of Clipper Maid of the Seas

The following events occurred in December 1988: For a more complete listing of notable deaths this month, see Deaths in December 1988.

== December 1, 1988 (Thursday) ==
- In Ordzhonikidze, North Ossetian Autonomous Soviet Socialist Republic, Russian Soviet Federative Socialist Republic, Soviet Union, four men and a woman hijacked a bus carrying 30 schoolchildren, a teacher and a driver and demanded US$2 million in ransom and a cargo plane to leave the country.
- Carlos Salinas de Gortari took office as President of Mexico.

December 1, 1988: First World AIDS Day

- The first World AIDS Day was held.
- NASA postponed the planned launch of Space Shuttle Atlantis from Kennedy Space Center in Florida on the STS-27 mission due to weather.
- Born:
  - Ashley Monique Clark, American television actress; in Brooklyn, New York City
  - Nadia Hilker, German actress; in Munich, Bavaria, West Germany
  - Tyler Joseph, American singer; in Columbus, Ohio
  - Zoë Kravitz, American actress, singer and model; in Los Angeles, California
  - Dan Mavraides, Greek-American professional basketball player; in Boston, Massachusetts
  - Taione Vea, Tonga rugby union player; in Auckland, New Zealand
- Died:
  - J. Vernon McGee, 84, American Presbyterian minister and theologian, died of heart failure.
  - Alun Oldfield-Davies CBE, 83, Welsh broadcaster and public servant

== December 2, 1988 (Friday) ==
- A cyclone in Bangladesh left 5 million homeless and thousands dead.
- Benazir Bhutto was sworn in as Prime Minister of Pakistan, becoming the first woman to head the government of an Islam-dominated republic.
- Agreeing to the bus hijackers' demands, the Soviet government gave them $2 million and an Aeroflot Ilyushin-76 cargo plane with a crew of eight to fly it. After the plane took off from Mineralnyye Vody, the hijackers decided to fly to Israel rather than Pakistan or Iraq, as they had intended. The plane landed at a military airstrip near Ben Gurion Airport in Lod, Israel, where the hijackers surrendered. Yitzhak Rabin, the Israeli Minister of Defense, criticized the Soviet response to the hijacking, saying, "I must admit I can't understand how they could manage to leave the Soviet Union without the Soviet authorities doing anything to prevent it."

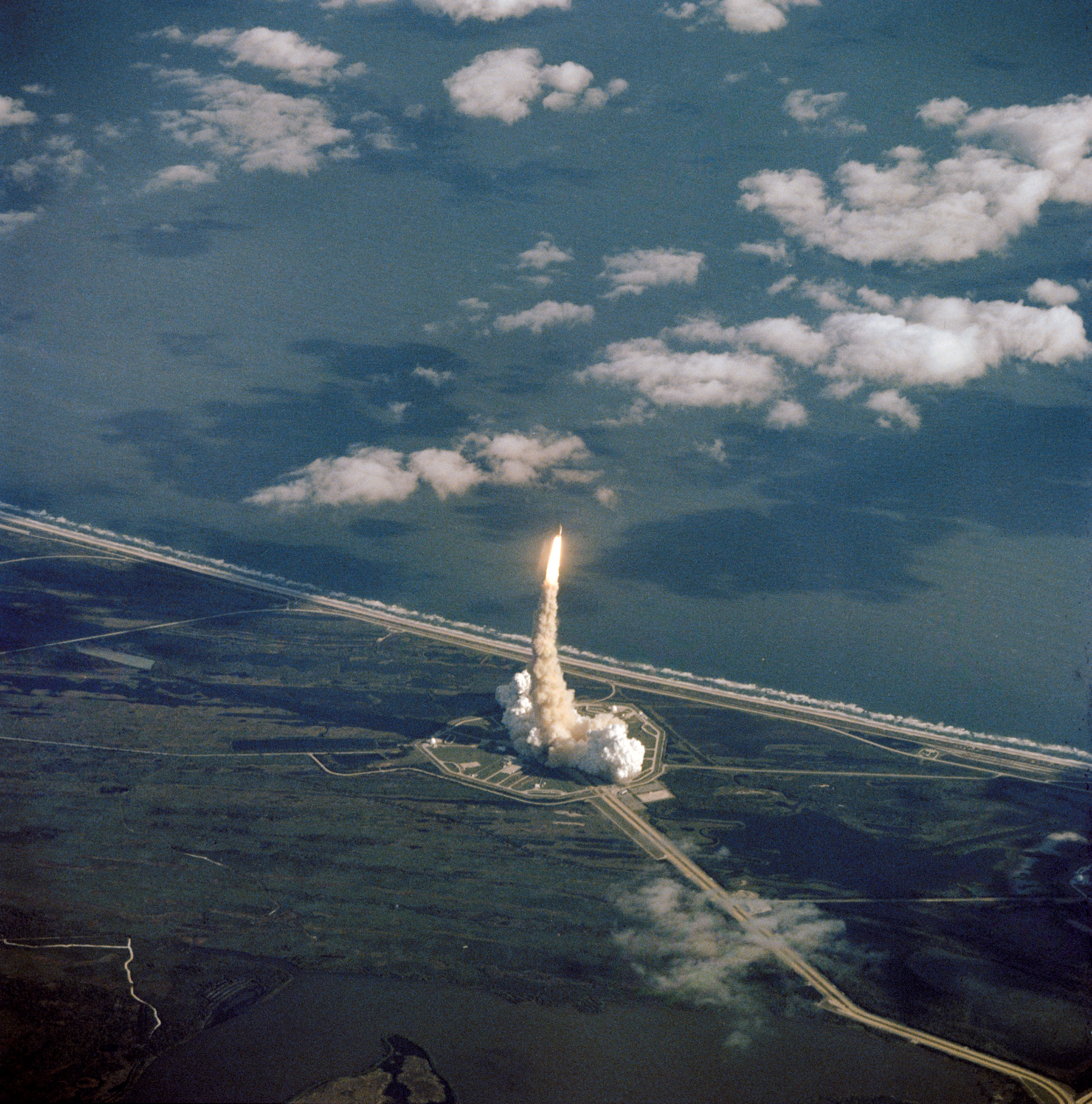
Launch of STS-27

- At 9:30:34 a.m. Eastern Standard Time, NASA launched Space Shuttle Atlantis on the classified STS-27 mission. Unbeknownst to the five-man crew, 85 seconds after liftoff, falling insulation from one of the Solid Rocket Boosters (SRBs) severely damaged the shuttle's thermal protection system. A few hours later, astronaut Mike Mullane used the shuttle's robot arm to deploy the mission's cargo, the Lacrosse 1 satellite (also known as ONYX) for the U.S. National Reconnaissance Office and the Central Intelligence Agency. In a 2001 interview, shuttle commander Robert L. Gibson would reveal that the satellite experienced a problem after deployment which required that the shuttle rendezvous with it for the issue to be corrected. Gibson's comments and confusion over the identification of the 100th U.S. spacewalk during the STS-98 mission in February 2001 would lead to speculation that STS-27 crewmembers—possibly astronauts Jerry L. Ross and William Shepherd—conducted a classified spacewalk to repair the satellite.
- U.S. President-elect George H. W. Bush and his defeated opponent in the presidential election, Massachusetts Governor Michael Dukakis, held a joint press conference.
- Born:
  - Edward Windsor, Lord Downpatrick, English fashion designer; in London, England
  - Alfred Enoch, British actor; in London, England
  - Fuse ODG (born Nana Richard Abiona), English rapper; in Tooting, South London, England
  - Stephen McGinn, Scottish footballer; in Glasgow, Scotland
- Died:
  - Karl-Heinz Bürger, 84, German SS and police leader
  - Tata Giacobetti (born Giovanni Giacobetti), 66, Italian singer and jazz musician (Quartetto Cetra), died of a heart attack.
  - Lloyd Rees AC CMG, 93, Australian landscape painter

== December 3, 1988 (Saturday) ==
- In the United Kingdom, Parliamentary Under-Secretary of State for Public Health Edwina Currie provoked outrage by stating that most of Britain's egg production was infected with the salmonella bacteria, causing an immediate nationwide decrease in egg sales.

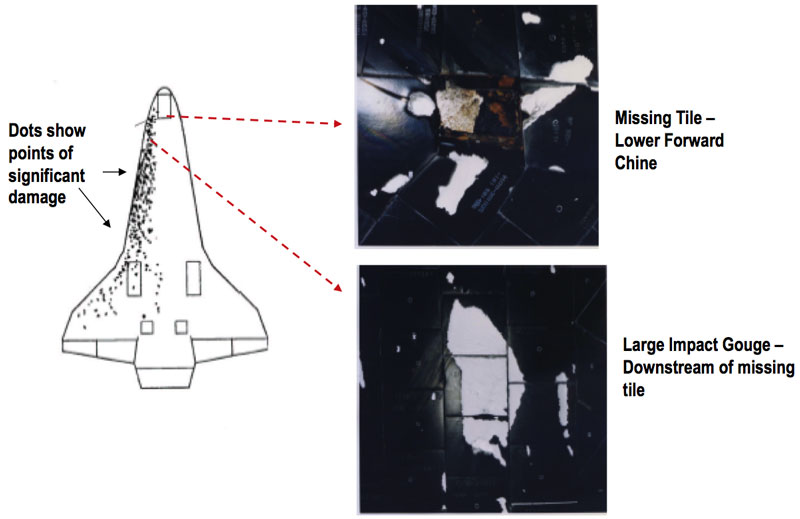
Diagram of damage to Space Shuttle Atlantis

- Mission Control requested that the STS-27 crew use Atlantis' robot arm to photograph the heat shield under the shuttle's right wing. According to his own later account, when shuttle commander Robert L. Gibson saw the tile damage on the camera monitor, he thought, "We are going to die." Due to the classified nature of the mission, the crew was required to use an encryption technique to send video of the damage to mission control, causing ground controllers to underestimate the severity of the damage and inform the crew that it was no worse than on previous flights.
- Born:
  - Melissa Aldana, Chilean tenor saxophone player; in Santiago, Chile
  - Kevin Clark, American child actor and musician; in Highland Park, Illinois (d. 2021, bicycle accident)

== December 4, 1988 (Sunday) ==
- Riding his motorcycle without a helmet, American actor Gary Busey had a near-fatal accident, sustaining a head injury that placed him in a coma for four weeks. He would regain consciousness on January 6, 1989, and would subsequently recover and resume his acting career.
- Born:
  - Miki Kanie, Japanese Olympic archer; in Gifu, Gifu Prefecture, Japan
  - Mario Maurer (a.k.a. Nutthawuth Suwannarat), Thai model and actor; in Bangkok, Thailand
  - Andriy Pylyavskyi, Ukrainian footballer; in Kiev, Ukrainian Soviet Socialist Republic, Soviet Union
- Died:
  - Osman Achmatowicz, 89, Polish chemist and academic
  - Jan Mesdag (born Jan Henry de Vey Mestdagh), 34, Dutch singer and cabaret artist, died of complications from AIDS.
  - Fernand Mourlot, 93, French printer and publisher
  - Joseph Zimmerman, M.S.F., 64, Swiss Catholic prelate, bishop of the Roman Catholic Diocese of Morombe in Madagascar, died due to a fall from stairs.

== December 5, 1988 (Monday) ==
- The day before reentry, STS-27 commander Gibson, still convinced that there was a strong possibility he and his shuttle crew would die the next day, told them to relax, saying, "No reason to die all tensed up."
- A U.S. Navy Grumman EA-6B Prowler on a training mission from the USS Constellation (CV-64) disappeared over the Pacific Ocean about 900 miles (1,400 km) west of San Diego, California. All four crewmen were lost.
- The United States Secret Service and the Soviet Mission to the United Nations notified the Trump Organization that Mikhail and Raisa Gorbachev would not visit Trump Tower during their upcoming visit to New York City. Trump spokespeople cited scheduling and security issues as reasons for the cancellation, but senior Soviet officials said that the Kremlin canceled the visit because of the problematic symbolism of the event.
- Born: Joanna Rowsell, English Olympic champion cyclist; in Carshalton, Greater London, England
- Died:
  - Einar Forseth, 96, Swedish artist
  - Monica Beatrice McKenzie, 83, New Zealand dietitian

== December 6, 1988 (Tuesday) ==
- The Australian Capital Territory (Self-Government) Act 1988 granted self-government to the Australian Capital Territory.
- U.S. President-elect Bush nominated Thomas R. Pickering as U.S. Ambassador to the United Nations, despite reports that Pickering helped arrange a secret donation to the Nicaraguan Contras when he was U.S. Ambassador to El Salvador. Pickering was only the second career diplomat ever named to the post.
- Speaking about the cancellation of the Gorbachevs' visit to Trump Tower, Donald Trump commented, "Trump Tower represents something very beautiful but also very opulent, and I had always questioned whether or not they'd be able to do it, on a political basis."

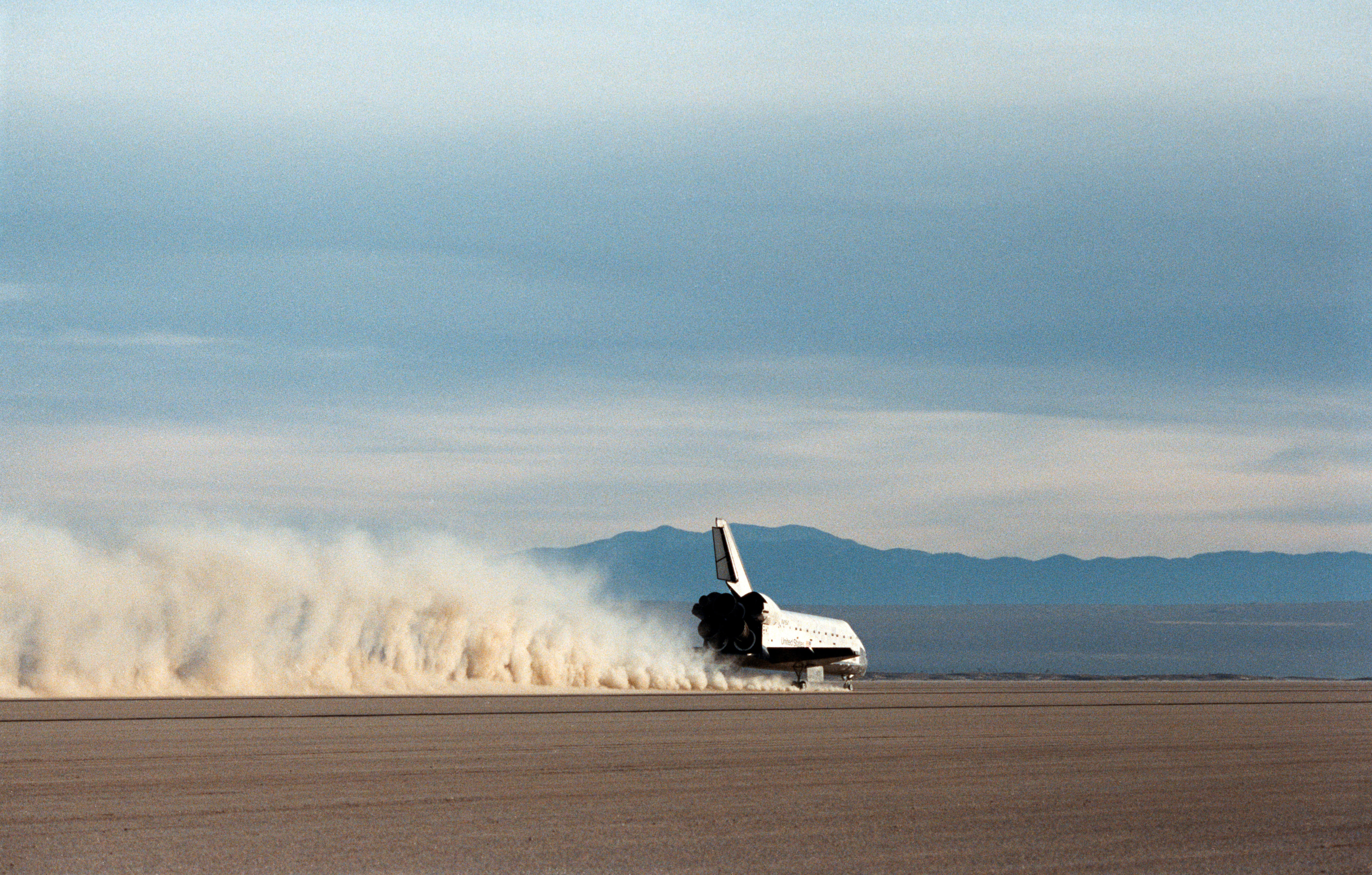
Space Shuttle Atlantis returns safely to Earth...

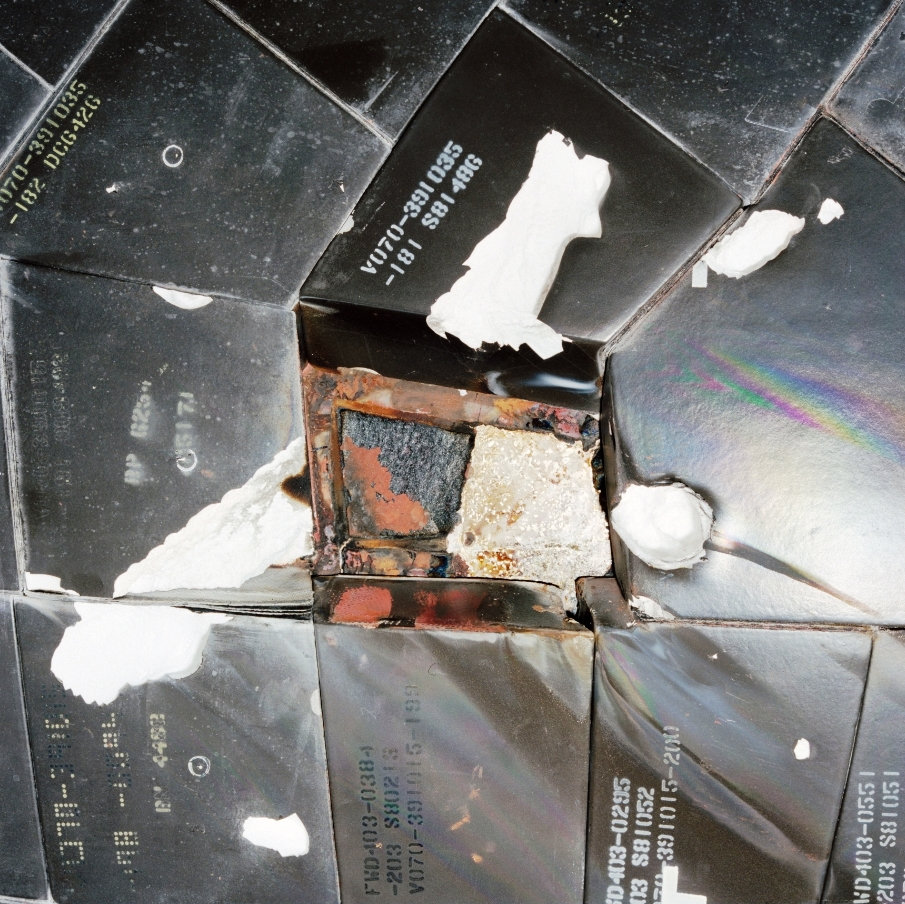
...despite damage to its thermal protection system

- Space Shuttle Atlantis and its crew returned safely to Earth at the end of the STS-27 mission, surviving the damage to the orbiter's heat shield and landing at Edwards Air Force Base in California at 3:36:11 p.m. Pacific Standard Time. During reentry, Gibson kept a close eye on a gauge that would indicate a developing problem, saying afterwards that this would have given him "at least 60 seconds to tell mission control what I thought of their analysis." 707 of the shuttle's heat shield tiles proved to have been damaged; one tile near the shuttle's nose was completely lost, causing a metal antenna anchor plate underneath it to become partly melted during reentry. Had the damage been in a different location, Atlantis would have been destroyed during its return to Earth, as Space Shuttle Columbia would be after sustaining similar damage in 2003.
- Born:
  - Laurent Bourgeois and Larry Nicolas Bourgeois, Les Twins, French identical twin brother new style hip-hop dancers; in Sarcelles, Val-d'Oise, France
  - Adam Eaton, American Major League Baseball outfielder; in Springfield, Ohio
  - Ravindra Jadeja, Indian international cricketer; in Navagam Ghed, Jamnagar district, Saurashtra, Gujarat, India
  - Sandra Nurmsalu, Estonian musician; in Alavere, Harju County, Soviet-occupied Estonia, Soviet Union
  - Sabrina Ouazani, French actress; in Saint-Denis, Seine-Saint-Denis, France
  - Nils Petersen, German professional and Olympic footballer; in Wernigerode, East Germany
  - Nobunaga Shimazaki, Japanese voice actor; in Shiogama, Miyagi Prefecture, Japan
  - Johnny Strange, English performance artist, street performer and stunt performer; in Lancashire, England
- Died:
  - Timothy Patrick Murphy, 29, American actor, died of AIDS.
  - Roy Orbison, 52, American rock musician, died of a heart attack.
  - Veerendra (aka Veerinder Singh; born Subhash Dhadwai), 40, Indian film actor, writer, producer and director, was shot along with actress Manpreet Kaur and cameraman Pritam Singh Balla while filming a scene for the movie Jatt Te Zameen on location in Talwandi Kalan, Punjab, India. Veerendra died at the scene; the other two victims survived.

== December 7, 1988 (Wednesday) ==
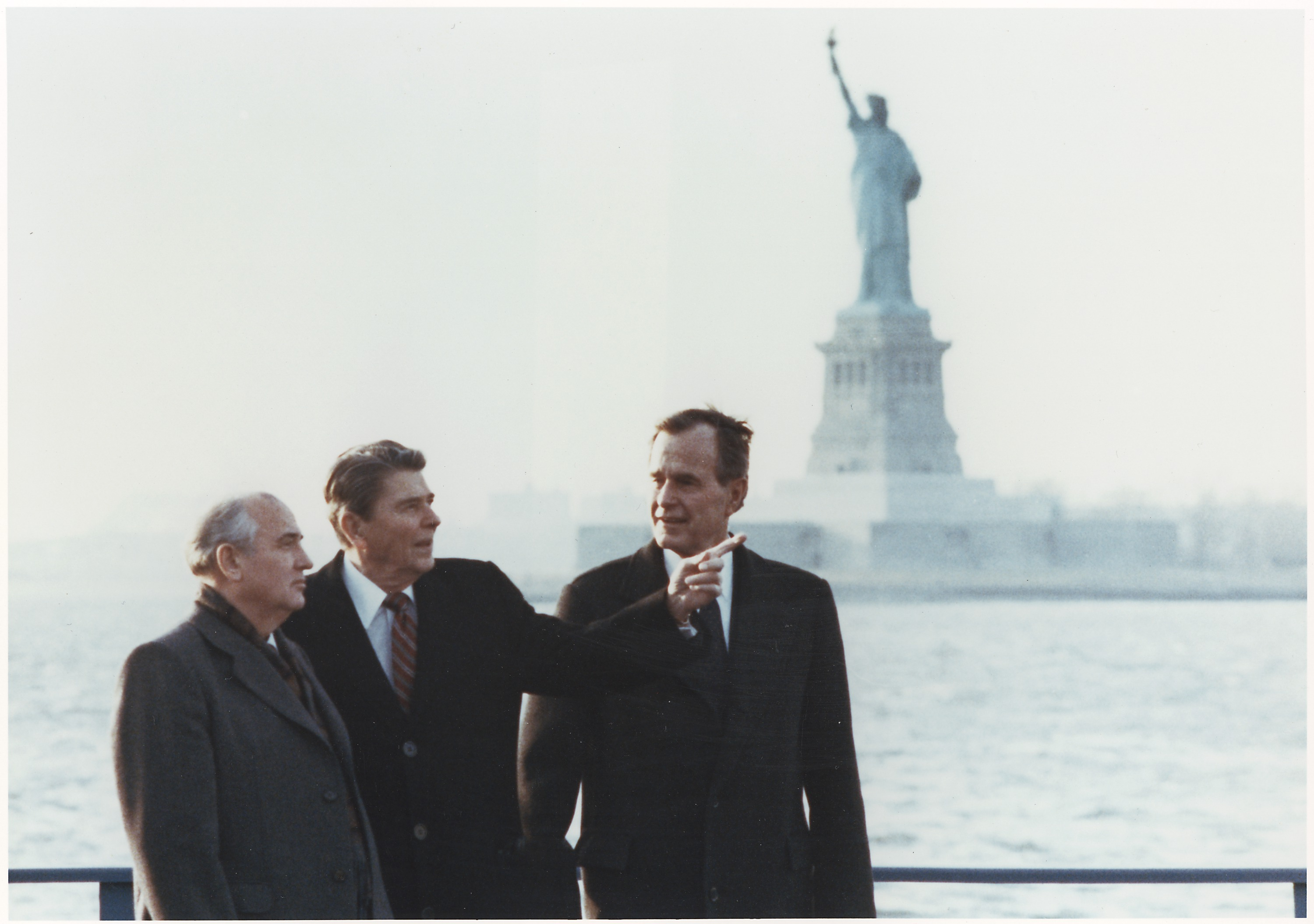
Gorbachev, Reagan and Bush on Governors Island...

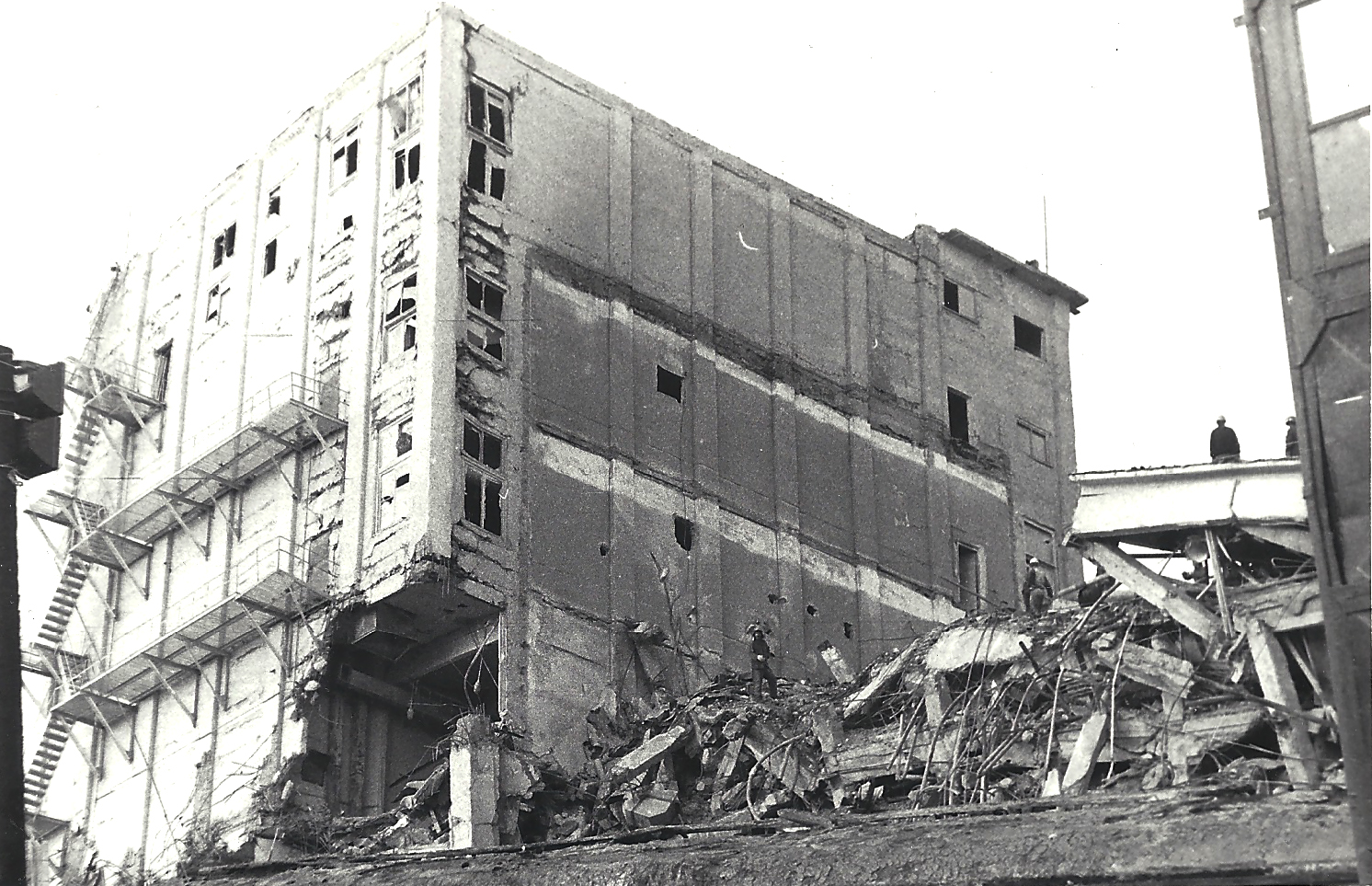
...on the day of a catastrophic earthquake in Armenia

- In Soviet Armenia, the M_{s} 6.8 Spitak earthquake killed nearly 25,000, injured 31,000 and left 400,000 homeless. The town of Spitak was completely destroyed.
- Singing Revolution: The Estonian language replaced Russian as the official language of the Estonian SSR.
- In South Africa, anti-apartheid revolutionary Nelson Mandela was transferred from the Constantiaberg Clinic, the second of two hospitals where he had been treated for tuberculosis, to a house at Victor Verster Prison, where he would serve the last 14 months of his imprisonment until his release on February 11, 1990.
- Mikhail Gorbachev, General Secretary of the Communist Party of the Soviet Union and Chairman of the Presidium of the Supreme Soviet of the Soviet Union, made an official visit to the United States, meeting with U.S. President Ronald Reagan and President-elect Bush at the Governors Island Summit in New York City. Gorbachev also promised major cuts in defense spending in a speech at the United Nations before cutting his visit short and flying home due to the earthquake in Armenia.
- In his apartment on the Upper West Side of Manhattan, New York City, American visual artist Chuck Close collapsed due to pain. He was able to present an award at the residence of the Mayor of New York City that evening, but then went to the hospital, where he experienced a convulsion and became paralyzed. Due to a blood clot damaging his spinal cord, Close would continue to have limited mobility, but would develop a new artistic style in the process of learning to paint again.
- Born:
  - Juan Abarca, Chilean footballer; in San Vicente de Tagua Tagua, Chile
  - Nathan Adrian, American Olympic champion swimmer; in Bremerton, Washington
  - Emily Browning, Australian actress; in Melbourne, Victoria, Australia
  - Angelina Gabueva, Russian tennis player; in Ordzhonikidze, North Ossetian Autonomous Soviet Socialist Republic, Russian SFSR, Soviet Union
  - James Marshall, New Zealand rugby union player; in Auckland, New Zealand
- Died:
  - Christopher Connelly, 47, American actor, died of lung cancer.
  - Dorothy Jordan, 82, American actress, died of congestive heart failure.
  - Peter Langan, 47, Irish restaurateur, died due to injuries from an October fire.

== December 8, 1988 (Thursday) ==
- The six-man crew of the Soviet space station Mir – Soviet cosmonauts Vladimir Georgiyevich Titov, Musa Manarov, Valeri Polyakov, Aleksandr Aleksandrovich Volkov and Sergei Krikalev and French spationaut Jean-Loup Chrétien – were forced to cut short a teleconference with diplomats from 47 countries due to preparations for the following day's spacewalk.
- Six people, including the pilot, died and 50 were injured as a result of the 1988 Remscheid A-10 crash in Remscheid, West Germany.
- The British government announced that it would close North East Shipbuilders with the loss of 2,400 jobs, bringing an end to the 600-year-old shipbuilding industry in Sunderland, England.
- Surface-to-air missiles shot down an American DC-7 carrying crop-dusting insecticides from Dakar, Senegal, to Agadir, Morocco, and damaged a second DC-7. All five crewmembers of the downed plane were killed.

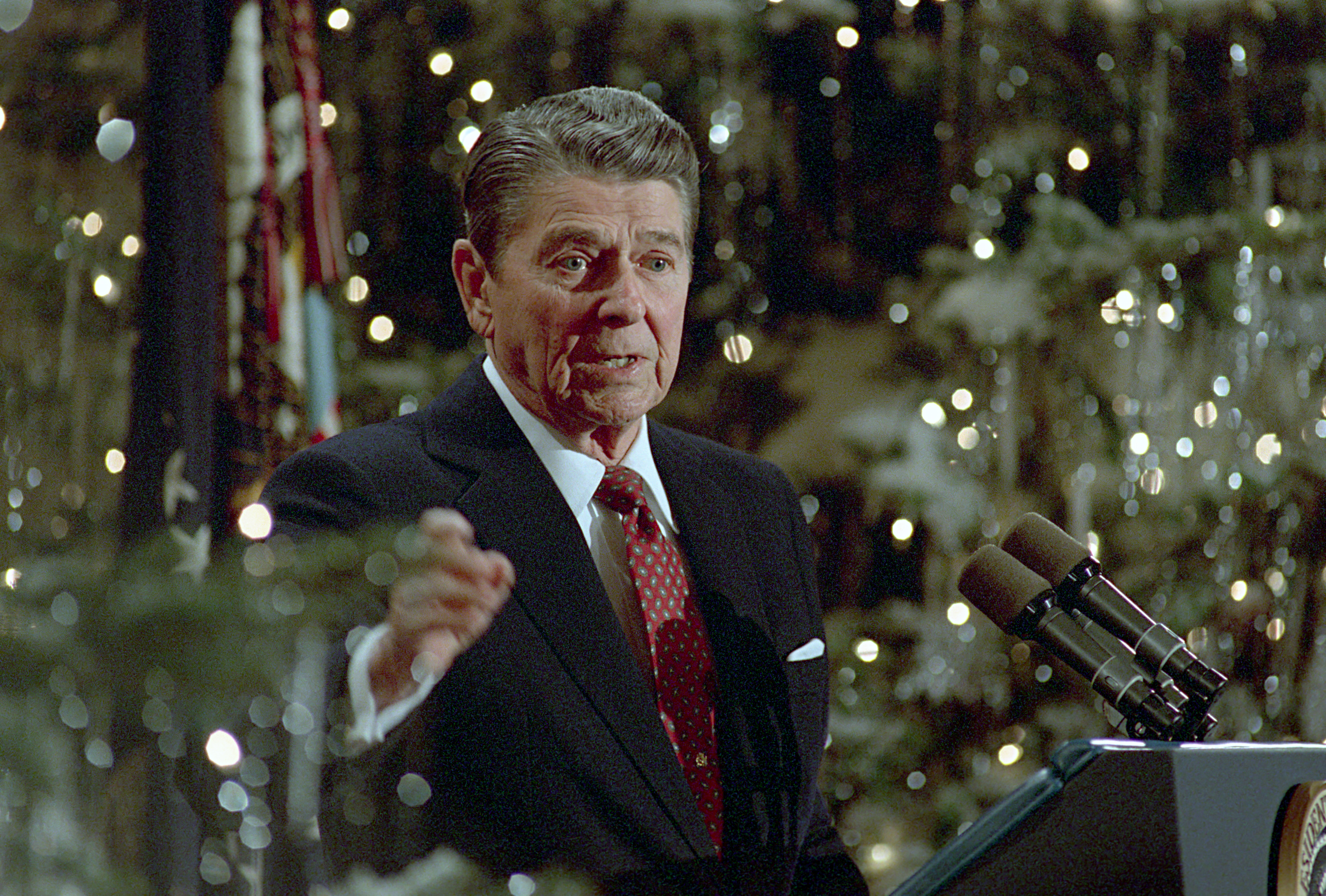
President Reagan's final East Room press conference

- U.S. President Ronald Reagan gave his final press conference in the East Room of the White House before leaving office on January 20, 1989. Reagan began the press conference by joking to reporters, "Got to stop meeting like this." He also expressed condolences to the Soviet Union over the Armenian earthquake. When asked whether he trusted Mikhail Gorbachev, Reagan emphasized the need to "trust but verify".
- U.S. Supreme Court Associate Justice William J. Brennan Jr. was hospitalized with pneumonia at Bethesda Naval Hospital.
- A U.S. military CH-47 Chinook helicopter participating in joint Honduran-U.S. maneuvers crashed near La Ceiba, Honduras, killing all five people aboard.
- Born:
  - Ahn Byung-keon, South Korean footballer; in Seoul, South Korea
  - Denis Biryukov, Russian volleyball player; in Volgograd, Russian SFSR, Soviet Union
  - Marcus Gilchrist, National Football League safety; in High Point, North Carolina
  - Linnea Liljegärd, Swedish footballer; in Arvika, Sweden
  - Philip Major, Canadian racing driver; in Ottawa, Ontario, Canada
  - Damien Marcq, French footballer; in Boulogne-sur-Mer, France
  - Ferdinand Tille, German volleyball player; in Mühldorf, West Germany
  - Simon van Velthooven, New Zealand Olympic track cyclist and America's Cup sailor; in Palmerston North, New Zealand
  - Jerry Vandam, French footballer; in Lille, France
  - Veronika Zvařičová, Czech Olympic biathlete; in Krnov, Czechoslovakia
- Died:
  - Airini Grennell, 78, New Zealand singer, pianist and broadcaster
  - John Joe McGirl, 67, Irish politician, chief of staff of the Irish Republican Army
  - Sir Andrew McKee, KCB, CBE, DSO, DFC, AFC, 86, Royal Air Force officer
  - Gene Quill, 60, American jazz alto saxophonist (Phil and Quill)
  - Hellmuth Reymann, 96, World War II German Army officer
  - Anne Seymour, 79, American character actress
  - Ulanhu, 80, Chinese general and politician

== December 9, 1988 (Friday) ==
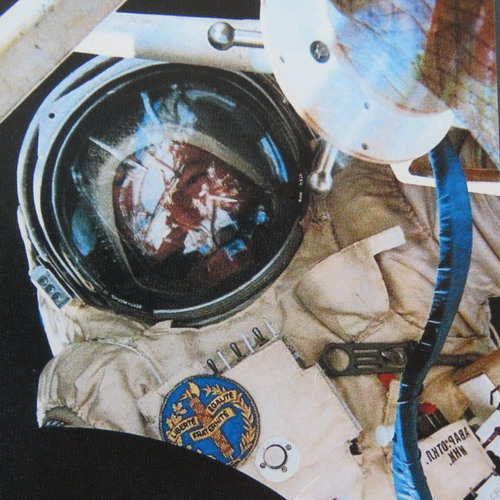
Jean-Loup Chrétien during spacewalk from Mir

- Spationaut Chrétien and cosmonaut Volkov conducted a spacewalk from Mir, the first EVA in history involving a spacewalker (Chrétien) who was not a member of the Soviet or U.S. space program. They installed the Enchantillons and ERA experiments on the exterior of Mir; when ERA failed to deploy properly, Volkov kicked it, causing it to unfold.
- The last Dodge Aries and Plymouth Reliant rolled off the assembly line in a Chrysler factory in the United States.
- Former Philippine president Ferdinand Marcos was hospitalized at St. Francis Medical Center in Honolulu, Hawaii, for treatment of congestive heart failure.
- Born:
  - Pietro Aradori, Italian professional basketball player; in Brescia, Italy
  - Kwadwo Asamoah, Ghanaian footballer; in Accra, Ghana
  - Adam Gettis, National Football League guard
  - Ji Liping, Chinese Olympic swimmer; in Shanghai County, Shanghai, China
  - Kim Kum-ok, North Korean Olympic long-distance runner and politician; in Pyongyang, North Korea
  - Georges Mandjeck, Cameroonian footballer; in Douala, Cameroon
  - Denarius Moore, National Football League wide receiver; in Tatum, Texas
  - Travian Robertson, National Football League defensive end; in Laurinburg, North Carolina
  - Korey Toomer, National Football League linebacker; in Las Vegas, Nevada
  - Veronika Vítková, Czech Olympic biathlete; in Vrchlabí, Czechoslovakia
  - Rhys Webb, Welsh rugby union player; in Bridgend, Wales
  - Robbie Weir, Northern Irish footballer; in Belfast, Northern Ireland
- Died:
  - Wally Borrevik, 67, American professional basketball player
  - Maria De Matteis, 90, Italian costume designer

== December 10, 1988 (Saturday) ==
- The naked body of 27-year-old American mathematician Scott Johnson was discovered at the bottom of the cliffs at North Head, New South Wales, Australia (near Manly, New South Wales). The death would be ruled a suicide but would be reinvestigated in the 21st century as a homophobic hate crime due to the persistence of Johnson's brother, Steve Johnson. 49-year-old Scott Price of Sydney would be arrested in May 2020 for Johnson's murder.
- The Soviet Union declared this day a national day of mourning in the wake of Wednesday's earthquake in Armenia. General Secretary Gorbachev toured the damaged cities.
- Approximately 3000 people attended a peaceful rally in Prague, Czechoslovakia, marking the 40th anniversary of the Universal Declaration of Human Rights, the first rally in the city's third district in almost 20 years. The district would ban such rallies again at a meeting on December 22.
- James W. Black, Gertrude B. Elion and George H. Hitchings won the Nobel Prize in Physiology or Medicine "for their discoveries of important principles for drug treatment."
- The trawler Arctic II was capsized by a large wave and sank about 55 miles (89 km) north of Unimak Pass in Alaska. All five crewmembers boarded a life raft, but captain Stan Michna and crewman Gary Heeney were swept off the raft by another large wave and were lost. The three survivors were rescued by the fishing vessel American Beauty.
- Born:
  - Wilfried Bony, Ivorian footballer; in Bingerville, Ivory Coast
  - Pak Chol-min, North Korean international footballer; in Pyongyang, North Korea
  - Neven Subotić, Serbian footballer; in Banja Luka, Socialist Republic of Bosnia and Herzegovina, Socialist Federal Republic of Yugoslavia
- Died:
  - Richard S. Castellano, 55, American actor
  - Anthony Cottrell CBE, 81, New Zealand rugby union player
  - Johnny Lawrence, 77, English cricketer and coach
  - Dorothy de Rothschild (born Dorothy Mathilde Pinto), 93, English philanthropist and activist

== December 11, 1988 (Sunday) ==
- An Ilyushin Il-76 cargo plane carrying rescue workers to Leninakan, a city devastated by the Armenian earthquake, crashed into the side of a mountain, killing 77 people.
- An explosion at an illegal fireworks shop at the La Merced Market in Mexico City set off multiple explosions and fires, killing over 60 people.
- Born: Tim Southee, New Zealand international cricketer; in Whangārei, Northland Region, New Zealand
- Died: Frank S. Pepper, 78, British comics writer

== December 12, 1988 (Monday) ==
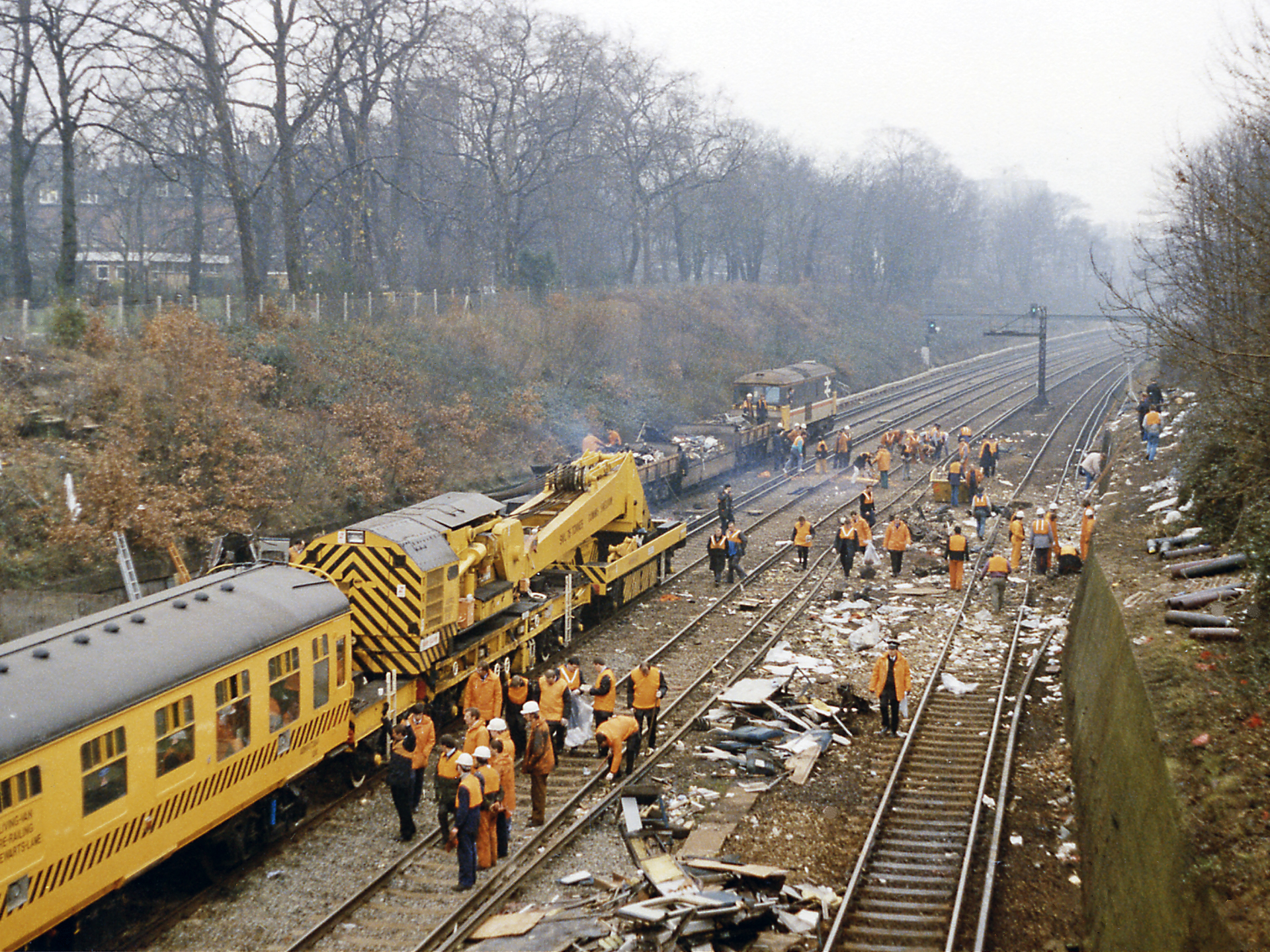
December 13, 1988: Cleanup efforts the day after the Clapham Junction rail crash

- The Clapham Junction rail crash in London killed 35 people and injured 484.
- At the Monday morning astronaut meeting in Houston, Texas, STS-27 mission commander Robert L. Gibson amused the military astronauts present and disgusted the civilians by joking that, although he still could not reveal details of the shuttle's payload, "I can say Armenia was its first target! And we only had the weapon set on stun!"
- Born:
  - Kévin Bru, French footballer; in Paris, France
  - Hahm Eun-jung, South Korean singer and actress; in Seoul, South Korea
  - Isaac John, New Zealand rugby league footballer; in Tokoroa, Waikato, New Zealand
- Died: June Tarpé Mills, 70, American comics artist and writer

== December 13, 1988 (Tuesday) ==
- Angolan Civil War: In Brazzaville, Congo, representatives from the governments of Angola, Cuba and South Africa signed the Brazzaville Protocol, mandating the withdrawal of Cuban and South African troops from Angola and paving the way for Namibia's independence through the Tripartite Accord.
- The Troubles in Portadown: 31-year-old Protestant civilian John Corry, a British Army and Royal Ulster Constabulary contractor, was shot and killed by the Irish Republican Army at his garage in Portadown, County Armagh, Northern Ireland.
- Born:
  - Darcy Blake, Welsh footballer; in New Tredegar, Wales
  - Rickie Fowler, American professional golfer; in Murrieta, California
  - Paul Johnston, English cricketer; in Hartlepool, County Durham, England
  - James Tamou, New Zealand rugby league footballer; in Palmerston North, New Zealand
- Died:
  - André Jaunet, 77, French flutist, died of liver cancer.
  - Brynmor John, 54, Welsh Labour politician, died of a heart attack.
  - Roy Urquhart (born Robert Elliot Urquhart), CB, DSO & Bar, 87, British Army officer

== December 14, 1988 (Wednesday) ==
- At 12:00 a.m. on the night of December 13, the RTVE broadcast signal cut out, beginning the 1988 Spanish general strike, called by the Workers' Commissions and Unión General de Trabajadores trade unions against the economic policies of the government of Prime Minister Felipe González. The strike brought Spain to a complete standstill for 24 hours, with 95% of the country's workers taking part. The strike would force the González government to withdraw its controversial "Plan de Empleo Juvenil" (Youth Employment Plan) and negotiate with the workers over their additional demands.
- After Yasser Arafat renounced violence, the U.S. said it would open dialogue with the Palestine Liberation Organization (PLO).
- Born:
  - Nicolas Batum, French professional and Olympic basketball player; in Lisieux, France
  - Nate Ebner, National Football League safety and special teamer and Olympic rugby sevens player; in Columbus, Ohio
  - Vanessa Hudgens, American actress and singer; in Salinas, California
  - Hayato Sakamoto, Japanese professional and Olympic champion baseball shortstop; in Itami, Hyōgo, Japan
- Died: Stuart Symington, 87, American politician, United States Senator from Missouri

== December 15, 1988 (Thursday) ==
- Born:
  - Floyd Ayité, French footballer; in Bordeaux, France
  - Boaz van de Beatz (born Boaz de Jong), Dutch-Israeli record producer and DJ
  - Emily Head, English actress; in Fulham, London, England
  - Steven Nzonzi, French footballer; in La Garenne-Colombes, France

== December 16, 1988 (Friday) ==
- A Mitsubishi MU-2 Marquise air taxi operated by Broughton Air Services crashed at Sturt Meadows Station in Western Australia. All 10 people aboard were killed.
- A series of burglaries took place and a man was murdered during the early hours around the M25 motorway in England, beginning the M25 Three case, later to be considered a miscarriage of justice.
- Edwina Currie resigned as Parliamentary Under-Secretary of State for Public Health.
- The Troubles in Downpatrick: 36-year-old Protestant John Moreland, a member of the Ulster Defence Regiment, was shot and killed by the Irish Republican Army while delivering coal off-duty in Downpatrick, County Down, Northern Ireland.
- The American film Rain Man, starring Tom Cruise and Dustin Hoffman, was released. It would win four Academy Awards, including Best Picture.
- U.S. President-elect Bush announced his nomination of John Tower, a former U.S. Senator from Texas and former chair of the Senate Armed Services Committee, to be his Secretary of Defense. The U.S. Senate would reject Tower's nomination on February 21, 1989.
- Lyndon LaRouche, a perennial candidate for U.S. President, was convicted of mail fraud.
- In Virginia Beach, Virginia, 16-year-old Nicholas Elliot, a student at Atlantic Shores Christian School, shot and killed 41-year-old teacher Karen Farley and wounded 37-year-old teacher Sam Marino before his gun jammed and teacher Hutch Matteson tackled and disarmed him. Authorities discovered three Molotov cocktails in Elliot's locker and pipe bomb materials in his bookbag. Elliot would be sentenced to life in prison in December 1989.
- Born:
  - Robin Cheong, New Zealand Olympic taekwondo athlete; in Uijeongbu, South Korea
  - Mats Hummels, German footballer; in Bergisch Gladbach, West Germany
  - Gael Mackie, Canadian Olympic artistic gymnast; in Vancouver, British Columbia, Canada
  - Park Seo-joon, South Korean actor and singer; in Seoul, South Korea
  - Anna Popplewell, English actress; in London, England
  - David Simón, Spanish footballer (born David Simón Rodríguez Santana); in Las Palmas de Gran Canaria, Spain
- Died:
  - John Cameron, 90, New Zealand cricketer
  - Hunter Hendry, 93, Australian cricketer
  - Ryōhei Koiso (born Ryohei Kishigami), 85, Japanese artist
  - Sylvester (born Sylvester James Jr.), 41, American singer-songwriter, died of complications from HIV/AIDS.

== December 17, 1988 (Saturday) ==
- Born:
  - Liisa Ehrberg, Estonian racing cyclist
  - Grethe Grünberg, Estonian ice dancer; in Tallinn, Estonian SSR, Soviet Union
  - Kris Joseph, Canadian National Basketball Association player; in Montreal, Quebec, Canada
  - Amélie Lacoste, Canadian figure skater; in Montreal, Quebec, Canada
  - Steve Rapira, New Zealand rugby league footballer; in Hamilton, Waikato, New Zealand
  - David Rudisha, Kenyan Olympic champion middle-distance runner; in Kilgoris, Narok County, Kenya
  - Craig Sutherland, Scottish footballer; in Edinburgh, Scotland
  - Rin Takanashi, Japanese film and television actress; in Chiba Prefecture, Japan
- Died: Jerry Hopper (born Harold Hankins Hopper), 81, American film and television director, died of heart disease.

== December 18, 1988 (Sunday) ==
- In Soweto, South Africa, Jerry Richardson, the coach of the Mandela United Football Club (MUFC), stabbed and killed Koekie Zwane (real name Pricilla Mosoeu), girlfriend of a member of the football club. MUFC members may have assisted Richardson in the killing. The MUFC was a vigilante group associated with Winnie Madikizela-Mandela, whom Richardson would later accuse of ordering him to kill Zwane on suspicion of her being an informer.
- Former Philippine president Ferdinand Marcos was released from St. Francis Medical Center in order to receive 24-hour medical care at his home.
- Born:
  - Lizzie Deignan (born Elizabeth Mary Armitstead), English professional and Olympic racing cyclist; in Otley, West Yorkshire, England
  - Seth Doege, American and Canadian football quarterback and coach; in San Angelo, Texas
  - Erica Rivera, American actress and singer; in Philadelphia, Pennsylvania
  - Brianne Theisen-Eaton (born Brianne Theisen), Canadian Olympic track and field athlete; in Saskatoon, Saskatchewan, Canada
  - Imad Wasim (born Syed Imad Wasim Haider), Pakistani cricketer; in Swansea, Glamorgan, Wales
- Died:
  - R. Arumugam, 35, Malaysian footballer, died in a traffic collision.
  - Niyazi Berkes, 80, Turkish Cypriot sociologist

== December 19, 1988 (Monday) ==
- 1988 Cannes and Nice attacks: At about 3:30 a.m., French far-right extremists carried out a false flag bomb attack on an immigrant hostel in Cagnes-sur-Mer, France, killing one person and injuring 12. Most of the hostel's guests were Tunisians, but the sole fatality from the attack was George Iordachescu, a Romanian exile. The bombers left behind leaflets bearing Stars of David and claimed responsibility in the name of the so-called "Masada, Action and Defense Movement" to imply that Jewish terrorists were to blame.
- In the 1988 Sri Lankan presidential election, Ranasinghe Premadasa was elected President of Sri Lanka with 50.43% of the vote.
- Born:
  - Casey Burgess, Australian television personality and singer (Hi-5); in Sydney, New South Wales, Australia
  - Mami Matsuyama, Japanese gravure idol, singer and actress; in Aomori Prefecture, Japan
  - Alexis Sánchez, Chilean footballer; in Tocopilla, Chile
  - Peter Winn, English semi-professional footballer; in Grimsby, England
- Died: Robert Bernstein, 69, American comic book writer, playwright and concert impresario, died of heart failure.

== December 20, 1988 (Tuesday) ==
- The United Nations Convention Against Illicit Traffic in Narcotic Drugs and Psychotropic Substances was signed at Vienna.
- The three-month-old daughter of the Duke and Duchess of York was christened Beatrice Elizabeth Mary.
- Trooper Johnny Montague Edrington of the Kentucky State Police was shot and killed with his own handgun during a traffic stop on Highway 80 west of London, Kentucky. His body was found in a ditch. As of 2021 the suspects would not yet have been apprehended.
- Died: Max Robinson, 49, American broadcast journalist, first African American network news anchor in the United States, died of complications from AIDS.

== December 21, 1988 (Wednesday) ==
- Soviet cosmonauts Titov and Manarov and French spationaut Chrétien returned safely to Earth from Mir aboard Soyuz TM-6, nearly 366 days after Titov and Manarov launched to Mir aboard Soyuz TM-4. Their spacecraft landed 180 kilometres (110 mi) southeast of Dzhezkazgan, Kazakh Soviet Socialist Republic, Soviet Union. Titov and Manarov had set a new record for the longest human spaceflight.

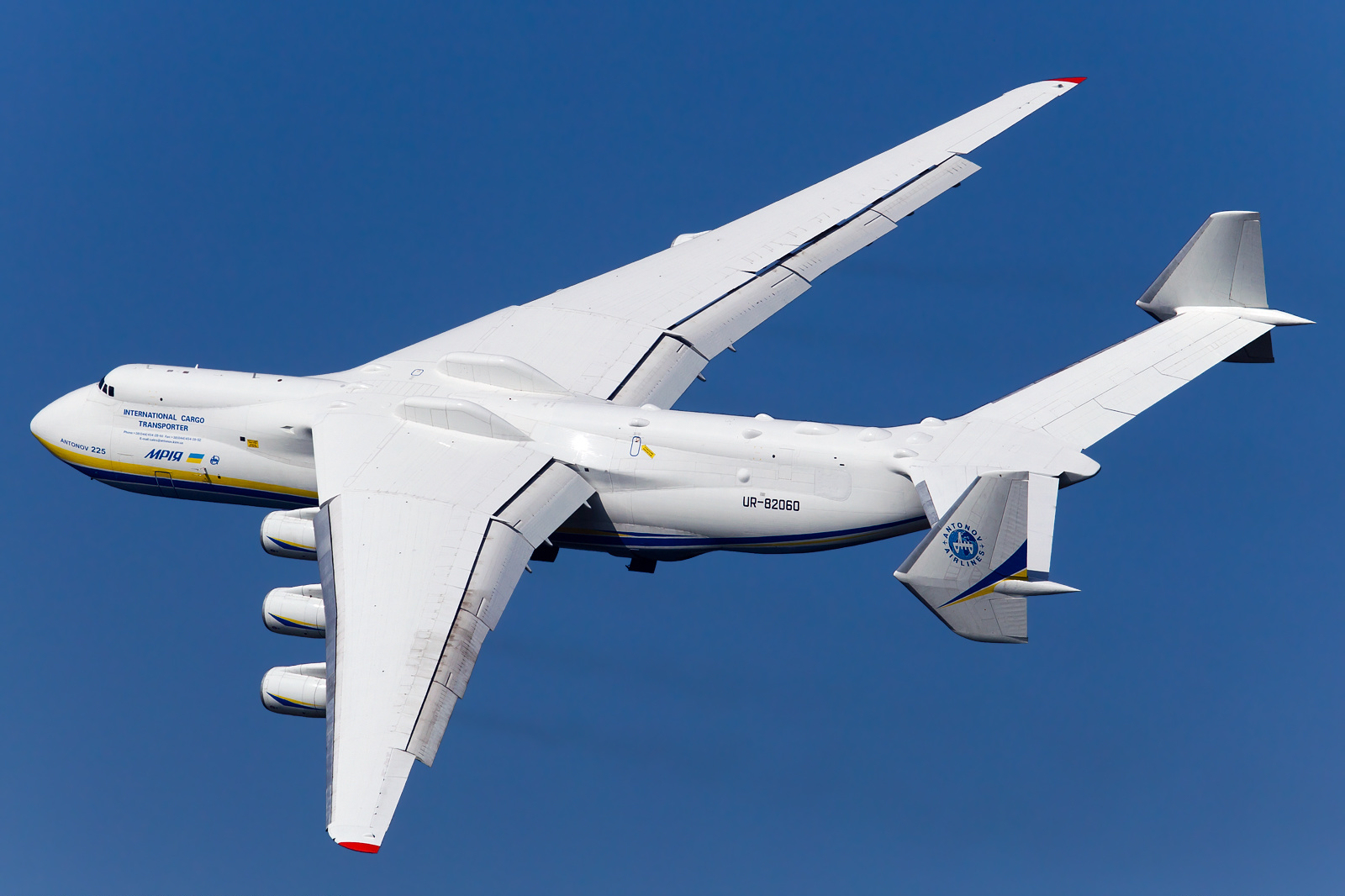
Antonov An-225 Mriya

- Soviet test pilot Alexander Galunenko made the first flight of the heaviest aircraft ever built, the Antonov An-225 Mriya. The An-225 was built to transport the Soviet spaceplane Buran.
- Pan Am Flight 103 was blown up over Lockerbie, Scotland, by a bomb hidden inside a radio-cassette player in one of the plane's luggage compartments, killing a total of 270 people (259 passengers and crew and 11 people on the ground). Libya was suspected of involvement. The victims of the bombing included:
  - James MacQuarrie, 55, Captain
  - Raymond R. Wagner, 52, First Officer
  - Jerry Avritt, 46, Flight Engineer
  - Michael S. Bernstein, 36, Assistant Deputy Director, Office of Special Investigations (United States Department of Justice)
  - Bernt Carlsson, 50, Swedish social democrat and diplomat, Assistant-Secretary-General of the United Nations, United Nations Commissioner for Namibia
  - Peter Dix, 35, Irish Olympic sailor
  - David Dornstein, 25, American writer, subject of his brother Ken Dornstein's memoir The Boy Who Fell Out of the Sky
  - James Fuller, 50, American automobile executive
  - Matthew Gannon, 34, American Central Intelligence Agency officer
  - Paul Jeffreys, 36, English rock musician, and his wife, Rachel Jeffreys, 23
  - Ronald Albert Lariviere, 33, Special Agent, Diplomatic Security Service (United States Department of State)
  - Charles McKee, US intelligence officer
  - Daniel Emmett O'Connor, 31, Special Agent, Diplomatic Security Service (United States Department of State)
  - Flora Swire, 23, daughter of Jim Swire, English physician who would become known for his activism in the bombing's aftermath
- American multinational investment bank Drexel Burnham Lambert agreed to plead guilty to insider trading and other violations and pay penalties of US$650 million.
- All the members of the Landtag of Liechtenstein belonging to the Progressive Citizens' Party resigned in protest of the majority Patriotic Union refusing to form a commission to investigate power abuse by the Liechtenstein state court in the Kunsthaus case.
- Born:
  - Danny Duffy, American Major League Baseball pitcher; in Goleta, California
  - Perri Shakes-Drayton, English Olympic track and field athlete; in Stepney, Greater London, England
- Died: (excluding the aforementioned victims of the Lockerbie bombing)
  - Eithne Dunne, 69, Irish actress
  - Ian Bruce Ferguson DSO, MC, 71, Australian Army officer
  - Willie Kamm, 88, American Major League Baseball third baseman
  - Charles Edward Peek, 84, New Zealand teacher, child welfare administrator and billiards player
  - Bob Steele (born Robert Adrian Bradbury), 82, American actor, died of emphysema.
  - Nikolaas Tinbergen, 81, Dutch ornithologist, recipient of the Nobel Prize in Physiology or Medicine
  - Venus Xtravaganza, 23, American transgender performer, murdered.

== December 22, 1988 (Thursday) ==
- In Figueras, Spain, 84-year-old artist Salvador Dalí was hospitalized after vomiting blood from an intestinal lesion. He would be released from the hospital on December 25. Dalí would die of heart failure on January 23, 1989.
- The day after the death of Bernt Carlsson, the United Nations Commissioner for Namibia, in the Pan Am Flight 103 bombing, representatives of Angola, Cuba and South Africa signed the Tripartite Accord, granting independence to Namibia from South Africa and ending the direct involvement of foreign troops in the Angolan Civil War. Afonso Van-Dunem of Angola, Isidoro Malmierca Peoli of Cuba and Pik Botha of South Africa signed the accords at the headquarters of the United Nations in New York City. Botha and other South African officials had been booked to fly to New York on Flight 103 but cancelled their bookings.
- At the Venustiano Carranza penitentiary in Tepic, Mexico, prisoners denied Christmas parole began a violent uprising, taking employees and visiting relatives hostage. About 10 inmates tried to storm the office of prison warden Samuel Alvarado, killing him in a shootout.
- A tugboat towing a fuel-oil barge to Grays Harbor, Washington struck the barge, spilling 70,000 US gallons (260,000 L; 58,000 imp gal) of oil. Oil came ashore along a 3 miles (4.8 km) stretch from Grays Harbor to Ocean Shores, Washington. This was the third oil spill in five years near Christmas in Western Washington.
- Born: Leigh Halfpenny, Welsh rugby union player; in Gorseinon, Swansea, Wales
- Died:
  - Gerhard Adler, 84, German analytical psychologist
  - Jack Bowden, 72, Irish cricketer and field hockey player
  - Chico Mendes (born Francisco Alves Mendes Filho), 44, Brazilian environmental activist, was murdered.
  - Vincent Sattler, 19, French footballer, died in a traffic collision.

== December 23, 1988 (Friday) ==
- In Liaoning, China, an express passenger train collided at a crossing with a bus filled with peasants, killing at least 46 people.
- The National Hockey League and the National Hockey League Players' Association denied a December 22 report in The Moscow News that the league had invited the Soviet Union to create an NHL team.
- A propane tank truck exploded on a ramp at an interstate interchange in Memphis, Tennessee, causing nine deaths of motorists and neighboring residents.
- As part of the Salvadoran Civil War, leftist rebels set off four car bombs near the San Salvador headquarters of the Joint Chiefs of Staff and the Ministry of National Defense; they also launched bombs over the walls of the compound by catapult. Three civilians were killed in the attack and 38 people were wounded.
- In the 1988 Independence Bowl, played at Independence Stadium in Shreveport, Louisiana, the Southern Miss Golden Eagles defeated the UTEP Miners by a score of 38–18. Golden Eagles quarterback Brett Favre commented, "We really whipped a good team tonight. We did it on TV, too. We should be a Top 20 team. We deserve it."
- The prison uprising in Tepic, Mexico, ended with at least 22 people dead. Commandos stormed the prison twice; during the first raid, Jorge Armando Duarte, the leader of a commando team, tried to talk the prisoners into surrendering and was shot and killed in response. The second raid successfully quelled the uprising.
- Born:
  - Mallory Hagan, American beauty pageant contestant and politician, Miss America 2013; in Memphis, Tennessee
  - Siyabonga Nhlapo, South African footballer; in Soweto, South Africa
- Died: Carlo Scorza, 91, Italian National Fascist Party politician

== December 24, 1988 (Saturday) ==
- At Hohai University in Nanjing, China, two African students attending a Christmas Eve university dance refused to register the names of the Chinese women accompanying them. The ensuing dispute became an overnight melee in which 13 people were injured. For seven hours, Chinese students threw rocks and bottles at dormitories occupied by African students. The event marked the beginning of anti-African protests in Nanjing that would last into January and were a precursor of later pro-democracy protests in China.
- PLO leaders met at Yasser Arafat's home outside Baghdad, Iraq, to discuss forming a government for a Palestinian state.
- Queen Elizabeth II broke precedent by broadcasting a second Christmas message to comfort those suffering after the Armenian earthquake, the Clapham Junction rail crash and the Pan Am Flight 103 bombing.
- U.S. President-elect Bush nominated Elizabeth Dole to be United States Secretary of Labor.
- 27-year-old Susan Dzialowy died after reentering her burning apartment on the Southwest Side of Chicago, Illinois, to save her three children, unaware that they had already escaped.
- In northern Indiana, six members of one family and a fiancée were killed in a traffic accident while traveling to a Christmas celebration.
- At Fort Pierre National Grassland in South Dakota, Governor George S. Mickelson was thrown off a snowmobile into a ravine, breaking his collarbone and four ribs. He was hospitalized in serious condition at St. Mary's Hospital in Pierre, South Dakota.
- U.S. President Reagan telephoned four members of the United States Armed Forces in different parts of the world with Christmas greetings.
- Florida State cornerback Deion Sanders was arrested after an incident at a gift shop in Fort Myers, Florida and charged with battery on an auxiliary police officer and disorderly conduct. He was released after posting a $2,600 bond.
- In the 1988 Sun Bowl, played at the Sun Bowl in El Paso, Texas, the Alabama Crimson Tide defeated the Army Cadets by a score of 29–28.
- In fiction, the events of the movie Die Hard take place on the night of December 24–25, 1988.
- Born:
  - Stefanos Athanasiadis, Greek footballer; in Lakkorna, Kallikrateia, Chalkidiki, Central Macedonia, Greece
  - Piyush Chawla, Indian cricketer; in Aligarh, Uttar Pradesh, India
  - Emre Özkan, Turkish footballer; in Üsküdar, Istanbul, Turkey
  - Simon Zenke, Nigerian footballer; in Kaduna, Nigeria
- Died:
  - Jainendra Kumar, 83, Indian writer, died two years after a paralytic attack.
  - Noel Willman, 70, Northern Irish actor and theater director

== December 25, 1988 (Sunday) ==
- Communist rebellion in the Philippines: In Malinao village, southeast of Manila, Communist rebels freed six Philippine soldiers captured on September 25 and 28.
- As the anti-African protests in Nanjing continued, over 2000 Chinese students arrived on the Hohai University campus at noon and again threw rocks and bottles at the African students' dormitories. They then marched to other campuses and threw rocks and bottles at dormitories also housing African students.
- In the early morning hours of Christmas, fires at three abortion clinics in Dallas, Texas, raised suspicions of arson by anti-abortion activists.
- Also in the early morning hours, Lieutenant Thurman Earl Sharp of the Marion County, Indiana Sheriff's Office was working the late shift at a second employment job to allow another officer to be with his family on Christmas Eve. He interrupted a gun store burglary in progress, was shot and killed and left at a remote building entrance; his patrol car was hidden behind a dumpster. The day shift relief officer discovered his body. As of 2021 Sharp's murder would remain unsolved.
- At about 4 a.m., former University of North Carolina running back Derrick Fenner was shot in the chest in a parking lot outside a Southwest Washington, D.C., nightclub after an altercation inside the club. He was released from the hospital the same day.
- A fire destroyed the 70-year-old United Methodist Church in Ware Shoals, South Carolina, a few hours after Christmas services.
- The Lonquimay volcano in Chile erupted for the first time since 1889, forcing the evacuation of the town of Malalcahuello.
- In the 1988 Aloha Bowl, played at Aloha Stadium in Honolulu, Hawaii, the Washington State Cougars defeated the Houston Cougars by a score of 24–22.
- On Christmas night, an Amtrak train derailed in Glenwood Canyon, east of Glenwood Springs, Colorado, stranding over 300 passengers. There were no reported injuries.
- Born:
  - Eric Gordon, National Basketball Association player; in Indianapolis, Indiana
  - Lukas Hinds-Johnson, German rugby union player
  - Joãozinho (born João Natailton Ramos dos Santos), Brazilian-Russian footballer; in Umbaúba, Brazil
  - Marco Mengoni, Italian singer-songwriter; in Ronciglione, Province of Viterbo, Italy
  - Lukas Autry Nelson, American vocalist and guitarist; in Austin, Texas
- Died:
  - Cornelis Eecen, 90, Dutch Olympic rower
  - Evgeny Golubev, 78, Soviet Russian composer
  - W. F. Grimes CBE, 83, Welsh archaeologist
  - Edward Pelham-Clinton, 10th Duke of Newcastle, 68, English lepidopterist
  - Shōhei Ōoka, 79, Japanese novelist and literary critic

== December 26, 1988 (Monday) ==
- During the anti-African protests in Nanjing, about 130 African students sought shelter at the city's central railway station, hoping to travel to Beijing. Meanwhile, about 1000 Chinese protestors marched through the streets decrying China's preferential treatment of foreigners. Several thousand Chinese protesters shouting anti-African slogans gathered at the train station later in the day. The protests were motivated partly by unfounded rumors that a Chinese person was killed in the disturbance on the night of December 24. In the evening, police placed the African students on buses, and they were driven away.
- The assassination of 41-year-old Indian politician Vangaveeti Mohana Ranga in Vijayawada sparked 60 hours of caste-based rioting in coastal districts of Andhra Pradesh, in which Kapus targeted Kamma-owned businesses for looting and burning. Over 42 people were killed in the violence.
- Born:
  - Marco Canola, Italian racing cyclist; in Vicenza, Italy
  - Cicinho (born Neuciano de Jesus Gusmão), Brazilian-Bulgarian footballer; in Belém, Pará, Brazil
  - Lucas Deaux, French footballer; in Reims, France
  - Guy Edi, Ivorian-French basketball player; in Agboville, Ivory Coast
  - Shiho Ogawa, Japanese footballer; in Kashima, Ibaraki, Japan
  - Kayo Satoh, Japanese model and television personality; in Aichi Prefecture, Japan
  - Etien Velikonja, Slovenian footballer; in Šempeter pri Gorici, Socialist Republic of Slovenia, SFR Yugoslavia
  - Mariaesthela Vilera, Venezuelan Olympic track cyclist; in Valle de la Pascua, Venezuela
  - Wang Meiyin, Chinese cyclist; in Qufu, China
- Died:
  - Herluf Bidstrup, 76, Danish cartoonist and illustrator
  - Julanne Johnston, 88, American silent film actress
  - John Loder (born William John Muir Lowe), 90, British-American actor
  - Glenn McCarthy, 81, American businessman
  - Pablo Sorozábal, 91, Spanish composer
  - Otto Zdansky, 94, Austrian paleontologist

== December 27, 1988 (Tuesday) ==
- Near Munshiganj, Bangladesh, a cargo vessel rammed the ferry Hasail from behind, causing it to sink; at least 200 people were killed.
- Bulgaria lifted its ban on Radio Free Europe.
- 34-year-old Brazilian footballer Enéas de Camargo (aka Enéas) died of pneumonia two days before his scheduled release from a São Paulo hospital where he was being treated for injuries from an August 22 car accident.
- U.S. President Ronald Reagan issued a presidential proclamation extending the territorial jurisdiction of the United States to a distance of 12 nautical miles (22 km; 14 mi) from the U.S. coastline.
- In a bout in Fort Myers, Florida, American boxer Bobby Czyz defeated Mike Devito by knockout in the seventh round.
- Born:
  - Hera Hilmar (born Hera Hilmarsdóttir), Icelandic actress; in Reykjavík, Iceland
  - Zavon Hines, Jamaican-English footballer and coach; in Kingston, Jamaica
  - Ok Taec-yeon, South Korean actor and singer (2PM); in Seoul, South Korea
  - Rick Porcello, American Major League Baseball pitcher; in Morristown, New Jersey
  - Hayley Williams, American singer (Paramore); in Meridian, Mississippi
- Died:
  - Hal Ashby, 59, American film director
  - William Fea, 90, New Zealand physician and rugby union and squash player
  - Maha Thiri Thudhamma Khin Kyi, 76, Burmese politician and diplomat, died of a stroke.
  - Jess Oppenheimer, 75, American radio and television producer, head writer and producer of I Love Lucy, died of heart failure due to complications from intestinal surgery.
  - Tecwyn Roberts, 63, Welsh aerospace engineer

== December 28, 1988 (Wednesday) ==
- The Presidium of the Supreme Soviet of the Soviet Union established the Order "For Personal Courage", the last new order established in the Soviet Union before its collapse.
- Four people were killed and 17 injured in a hotel fire in La Roche-sur-Yon, France.
- In Santa Clara, Cuba, the Che Guevara Mausoleum was inaugurated on the 30th anniversary of the beginning of the Battle of Santa Clara, with Raúl Castro, Minister of the Revolutionary Armed Forces, in attendance.
- The United States formally extended the limit of its territorial waters from 5 kilometres (3.1 mi) to 19 kilometres (12 mi).
- The horse Distant Power threw jockey Pat Valenzuela shortly after the start of a race at Santa Anita Park in Arcadia, California. Valenzuela suffered a concussion and facial fractures and was hospitalized.
- In a bout in Bakersfield, California, American boxer George Foreman defeated American David Jaco by knockout at 2:03 of the first round.
- Born:
  - Islambek Albiev, Russian Olympic champion Greco-Roman wrestler; in Grozny, Checheno-Ingush Autonomous Soviet Socialist Republic, Russian SFSR, Soviet Union
  - Balal Arezou, Afghan footballer; in Kabul, Afghanistan
  - Inès Boubakri, Tunisian Olympic fencer; in Tunis, Tunisia
  - Jordy Buijs, Dutch footballer; in South Holland, Netherlands
  - Katlyn Chookagian, American mixed martial artist; in Quakertown, Pennsylvania
  - Laganja Estranja (born Jay Jackson), American choreographer and drag queen; in Dallas, Texas
  - Ched Evans, Welsh footballer; in Denbighshire, Wales
  - Elfyn Evans, Welsh rally driver; in Dolgellau, Wales
  - Florrie (born Florence Ellen Arnold), English pop singer-songwriter; in Bristol, England
  - Kohei Kameyama, Japanese Olympic artistic gymnast; in Sendai, Miyagi Prefecture, Japan
  - Enrica Merlo, Italian volleyball player; in Este, Veneto, Italy
  - Nsima Peter, Nigerian footballer
  - Perri Pierre, American filmmaker and actor; in Brooklyn, New York City
  - Martina Pretelli, Sammarinese track and field athlete; in Borgo Maggiore, San Marino
  - Adam Sarota, Australian footballer; in Gordonvale, Queensland, Australia
  - Dzmitry Shershan, Belarusian Olympic judoka; in Navapolatsk, Byelorussian Soviet Socialist Republic, Soviet Union
  - Abdou Razack Traoré, Burkinabe footballer; in Abidjan, Ivory Coast
- Died:
  - Karlfried Graf Dürckheim, 92, German diplomat, psychotherapist and Zen master
  - Björn Kurtén, 64, Finnish vertebrate paleontologist
  - Vittoria Titomanlio, 89, Italian politician

== December 29, 1988 (Thursday) ==
- Corazon Aquino, President of the Philippines, appointed Jose Ong to succeed Bienvenido Tan as Tax Commissioner.
- Li Menghua, China's Minister of Physical Culture and Sports, lost his job, reportedly due to the poor performance of the Chinese team at the 1988 Summer Olympics in Seoul, South Korea.
- In Orlando, Soweto, South Africa, a group of people acting on the instructions of Winnie Madikizela-Mandela abducted four youths from a Methodist manse run by the Reverend Paul Verryn. The kidnappers, including Jerry Richardson, John Morgan, Katiza Cebekhulu, Xoliswa Falati and members of the Mandela United Football Club, abducted Thabiso Mono, Pelo Mekgwe, Kenneth Kgase and Stompie Seipei due to unfounded allegations that Verryn had sexually abused youths resident at the manse. They took the boys to Madikizela-Mandela's residence in Diepkloof Extension, where Richardson, Cebekhulu, Falati, MUFC members and Madikizela-Mandela herself assaulted the youths. Seipei was falsely accused of being a police informer and was assaulted most severely of the four. He would be murdered on January 1, 1989; the other three youths would be released in January.
- In response to the December 21 bombing of Pan Am Flight 103, the Federal Aviation Administration announced new security measures to take effect within 48 hours for all U.S. airlines at European and Middle Eastern airports.
- In the 1988 All-American Bowl, played at Legion Field in Birmingham, Alabama, the Florida Gators defeated the Illinois Fighting Illini by a score of 14–10. Florida running back Emmitt Smith was named the game's MVP.
- In the 1988 Freedom Bowl, played at Anaheim Stadium in Anaheim, California, the BYU Cougars defeated the Colorado Buffaloes by a score of 20–17.
- Former Philippine president Ferdinand Marcos was again hospitalized at St. Francis Medical Center in Honolulu for treatment of congestive heart failure and possible pneumonia.
- Born:
  - Eric Berry, National Football League safety; in Atlanta, Georgia
  - Christen Press, American professional and Olympic soccer player; in Los Angeles, California
  - Ágnes Szávay, Hungarian professional and Olympic tennis player; in Kiskunhalas, Hungary
- Died:
  - Émile Aillaud, 86, French architect
  - Mike Beuttler, 48, British Formula One driver, died of complications from AIDS.
  - Sir Ieuan Maddock CB, OBE, FRS, 71, Welsh nuclear scientist

== December 30, 1988 (Friday) ==
- Soviet news agency TASS reported that the Russian Orthodox Church would allow members of the clergy to run for office in the upcoming March 26 elections for the Congress of People's Deputies of the Soviet Union.
- Branko Mikulić, the Prime Minister of Yugoslavia, submitted a letter of resignation for himself and the 30 members of his Cabinet due to the country's economic problems, the first such resignation since communist rule began in 1945.
- The Czechoslovak prototype aircraft L-610M made its first flight.
- Oliver North's legal team subpoenaed U.S. President Reagan and President-elect Bush as defense witnesses in the retired Marine lieutenant colonel's trial on charges of conspiracy and theft related to the Iran–Contra affair.
- In the 1988 Holiday Bowl, played at Jack Murphy Stadium in San Diego, California, the Oklahoma State Cowboys defeated the Wyoming Cowboys by a score of 62–14.
- Born:
  - Maria Apostolidi, Greek Olympic artistic gymnast; in Athens, Greece
  - Leon Jackson, Scottish singer; in Whitburn, West Lothian, Scotland
  - Cameron Long, American professional basketball player; in Palm Bay, Florida
  - Kirsty-Leigh Porter, English actress; in Manchester, England
- Died:
  - Yuli Daniel, 63, Soviet writer, poet and dissident, died of a stroke.
  - Takeo Fujisawa, 78, Japanese businessman, co-founder of Honda, died of a heart attack.
  - Isamu Noguchi, 84, Japanese-American artist and landscape architect, died of heart failure.

== December 31, 1988 (Saturday) ==
- In the 1988 Peach Bowl (December), played at Atlanta–Fulton County Stadium in Atlanta, Georgia, the NC State Wolfpack defeated the Iowa Hawkeyes by a score of 28–23.
- The Chicago Bears defeated the Philadelphia Eagles by a score of 20–12 in an NFC Divisional Playoff Game at Soldier Field in Chicago, Illinois. The game would become known as the Fog Bowl due to the adverse weather conditions in which it was played.
- Shortly before midnight on New Year's Eve, the tourist boat Bateau Mouche IV capsized near Copacabana Beach in Rio de Janeiro, Brazil, with the loss of 55 lives.
- Born:
  - Matthew Atkinson, American actor and musician; in Marietta, Georgia
  - Luca Ceci, Italian track cyclist; in Ascoli Piceno, Marche, Italy
  - Cristian Coimbra, Bolivian footballer; in Santa Cruz de la Sierra, Bolivia
  - Álex Colomé, Dominican Major League Baseball pitcher; in Santo Domingo, Distrito Nacional, Dominican Republic
  - Edvin Kanka Ćudić (born Edvin Ćudić), Bosnian human rights activist and martial artist; in Brčko, SR Bosnia and Herzegovina, SFR Yugoslavia
  - Tijan Jaiteh, Gambian footballer; in Bwiam, Gambia
  - Kyle Johnson, Canadian-born British Olympic basketball player; in Scarborough, Toronto, Ontario, Canada
  - Konan Serge Kouadio, Ivorian footballer; in Abidjan, Ivory Coast
  - Joel Martínez, Andorran footballer; in Escaldes-Engordany, Andorra
  - Mira Rai, Nepalese trail runner and skyrunner
  - Michal Řepík, Czech professional ice hockey left winger; in Vlašim, Czechoslovakia
  - Alain Traoré, Burkinabé footballer; in Bobo-Dioulasso, Burkina Faso
  - Enrique Triverio, Argentine footballer; in Aldao, Santa Fe, Argentina
- Died:
  - Yara Amaral, 52, Brazilian actress, died in the sinking of Bateau Mouche IV.
  - Sir Christopher Andrewes FRS, 92, British virologist
  - Oliver L. Austin, 85, American ornithologist
  - Nicolas Calas (pseudonym for Nikos Kalamaris), 81, Greek-American poet and art critic, died of heart failure.
