= Joseph Zimmermann =

Joseph Zimmermann may refer to:

- Joseph Zimmermann (engineer) (1912–2004), engineer who invented the first answering machine
- Joseph Zimmermann (bishop) (1923–1988), Roman Catholic bishop
- Joey Zimmerman (born 1986), American actor and musician.
- Pierre-Joseph-Guillaume Zimmerman (1785–1853), known as Joseph Zimmermann, French pianist, composer, and music teacher
