= Diocese of Morombe =

Roman Catholic diocese in Madagascar

Coordinates: 21°44′27″S 43°22′01″E

Diocese of Morombe Dioecesis Morombensis
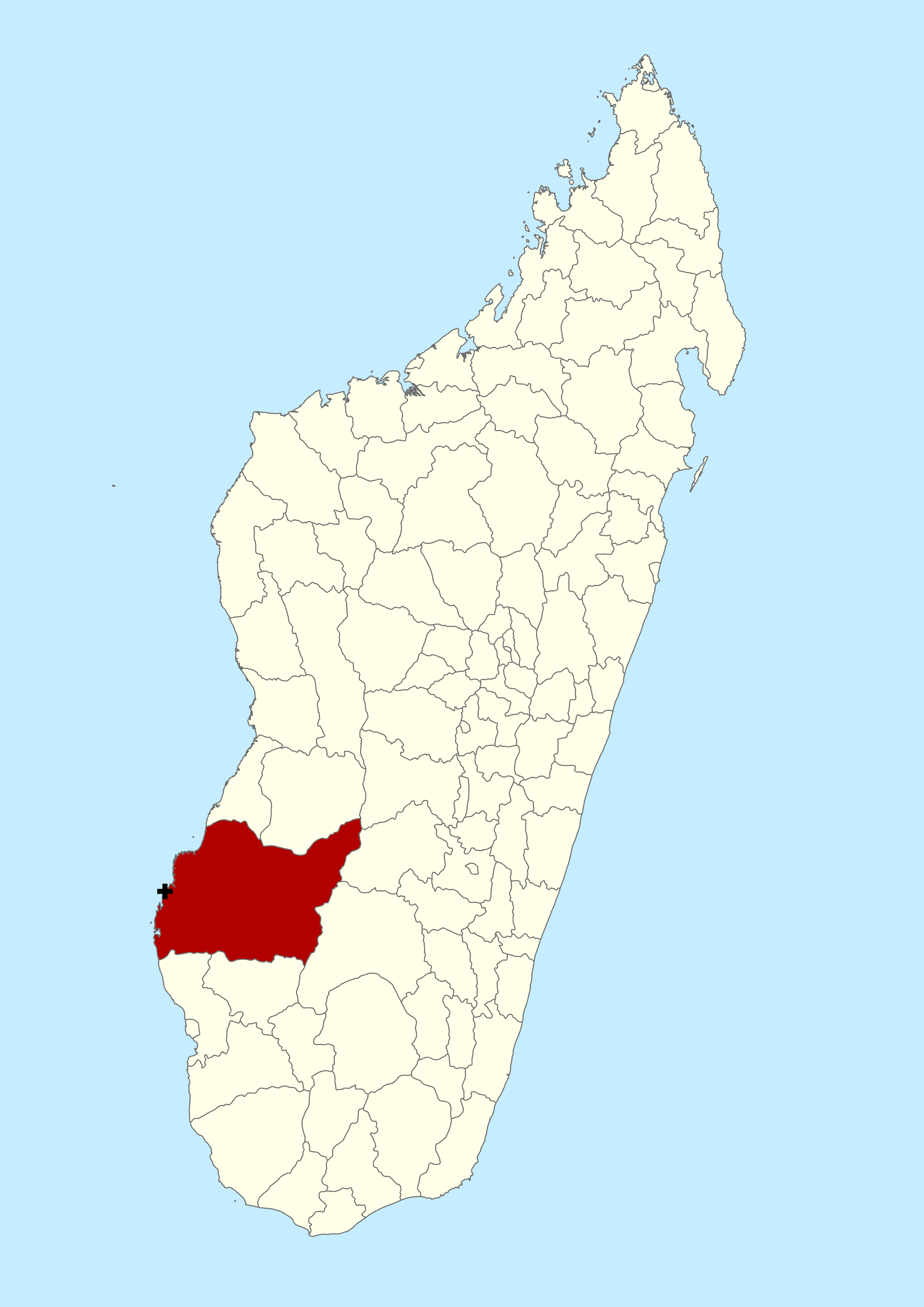

Location
- Country: Madagascar
- Territory: Manja, Beroroha, Morombe, and Ankazoabo districts
- Metropolitan: Toliara

Statistics
- Area: 31,917 km^{2} (12,323 sq mi)
- Population: Total; Catholics: (as of 2002); 387,263; 31,206 (8.1%)

Information
- Rite: Latin Rite
- Cathedral: Cathédrale du Sacré-Cœur de Jésus

Current leadership
- Pope: Leo XIV
- Bishop: Jean Désiré Razafinirina

The Roman Catholic Diocese of Morombe (Latin: Moromben(sis)) is a diocese located in the ecclesiastical province of Toliara in Madagascar. The episcopal see is in the city of Morombe.

== History ==
On April 25, 1960, Pope John XXIII established the Diocese of Morombe by partitioning the Diocese of Morondava. The new diocese contained the districts of Manja, Beroroha, Morombe, and Ankazoabo. Joseph Zimmermann, M.S.F., was the first bishop. As of 2003, the diocese included 200 primary schools, seven secondary schools, and seven missionary hospitals.

== Leadership ==
- Bishops of Morombe (Roman rite)
  - Bishop Joseph Zimmermann, M.S.F. (28 May 1960 – 4 December 1988)
  - Bishop Alwin Albert Hafner, M.S.F. (15 May 1989 – 15 July 2000)
  - Bishop Zygmunt Robaszkiewicz, M.S.F. (24 April 2001 – 19 November 2022)
  - Bishop Jean Désiré Razafinirina (12 February 2024 – )

== See also ==
- Roman Catholicism in Madagascar
