= RC Strasbourg Alsace Academy =

Academy of French football club RC Strasbourg Alsace

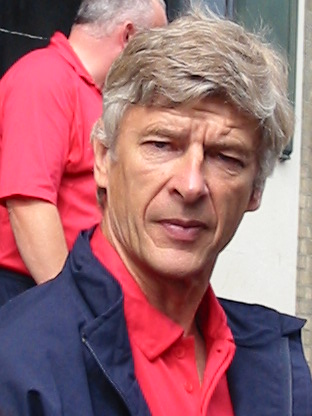
Arsène Wenger, head of the academy from 1981 to 1983.

The RC Strasbourg Alsace Academy, officially the Racing Mutest Académie, is the youth academy of French football club RC Strasbourg Alsace. It was founded in 1972.

== History ==
RC Strasbourg Alsace's academy was created for the training of young players in 1972. The first training center, located on the east side of the Stade de la Meinau, was created in 1974 under the leadership of athletic director Robert Domergue and Jacques Berthommier, first coach of the training center. Among the champions of France in 1979, Albert Gemmrich, Jacques Glassmann, Jean-Jacques Marx, Léonard Specht and Roland Wagner were trained by Racing. Another member of the champions of France in 1979, Arsène Wenger, was head of the academy between 1981 and 1983 at the end of his playing career. In the 1980s, Vincent Sattler, who died in a car accident when he was a top prospect of French football, and José Cobos passed through the center. In the following decade, players like Olivier Dacourt, Martin Djetou and Valérien Ismaël were products of Strasbourg's academy.

Because of the age of the old building, a new training center was built near the Meinau stadium under the leadership of President Patrick Proisy. The new center, which opened in October 2000, includes a covered field with synthetic grass 40 meters by 60, also used by the professional group in inclement weather. The buildings, originally owned by RC Strasbourg, were built on municipal land which was leased to the club until 2045. In 2010 the city of Strasbourg bought for €4,074,000 the buildings of the training center at the club, which was then in financial difficulty. The center's budget for the 2010–2011 season was €2.5 million and was funded in the amounts of €1.5 million by the local authorities and 1 million by the company RC Strasbourg.

In 2010–11, the club was deemed "too expensive" by the National President Jafar Hilali, who wrote in Dernières Nouvelles d'Alsace "I ask myself a simple question. What good is it to keep a training center with a budget of € 2.5 million, equal to three-quarters of the clubs in National?"(translated). In case of merger with Football Club de Mulhouse, the training center would have remained in Strasbourg but the club have played in Mulhouse. After the announcement of the bankruptcy filing, the players were free to choose their future course.

Although it was likely that it would disappear at the end of 2010–2011, Racing retained its training center after filing for bankruptcy, and in October 2011, the city of Strasbourg awarded a grant of €300,000 to the association for its operations. Since filing for bankruptcy, the center is no longer franchised. It became a school of elite soccer. In 2012–2013, there will no longer 34 but 15 permanent residents at the training center.

== Operations ==
The center welcomes young players 16 years of age and older. Aspiring players, aged 16 to 18 years, participating in the Under 18s and students up to 21 years, play on the reserve team. Since 2000, players such as Cédric Kanté, Yacine Abdessadki, Éric Mouloungui or Kevin Gameiro were trained in Strasbourg. In recent tournaments, the 18-year-old team reached the national Coupe Gambardella final in 2003 and won the event in 2006. The reserve team competed for the championship and the CFA Cup Alsace, which they have won several times since the 2000s.

The National Technical Director of the French Soccer Federation (Fédération française de football) conducts an annual ranking of the training centers of all professional teams. This ranking takes into account the so-called efficiency relative to young home-grown players (number of professional contracts, number of games played by professional team and the national team, school diplomas) and the status of educators. Of a total of 32 training centers, the RC Strasbourg ranks 17th in 2007 and 16th in 2008 and 12th in 2009, then in the second division, Racing ranks 8th in 2009-2010 of all professional clubs and ranks first among clubs not playing in Ligue 1

== Honours ==
Youth teams
- Gambardella Cup (2) (Coupe Gambardella)
  - Winner in 1965 and 2006.
  - Finalist in 2003
- France Championship under 18 (Championnat de France des moins de 18 ans) (1)
  - Champion in 1992
- Quevilly tournament (Tournoi de Quevilly) (16 years)
  - Winner in 2008
- France Cadet Championship (1) (Championnat de France des cadets)
  - Champion in 1976.
  - Finalist in 1975.
- National Benjamins Cup (Coupe nationale des benjamins)
  - Finalist in 2004
International Competitions
- Division 3
  - Winner of the East Group in 1980.
- Division 4
  - Winner of Group C in 1986 and 1988.
- CFA 2
  - Winner of Group C in 2011
- Alsace Cup (10) (Coupe d'Alsace) (Note: Since 2000, the Alsace Cup is played exclusively by amateur reserve teams, professional or semi-professional players are not allowed to participate. Alsace association football league, Ligue d'Alsace Football 2010/2011 Directory - Cup Regulations Alsace - Article 3, section 40)
  - Winner in 2006, 2008 and 2010.

== Bibliography ==
- News d'Ill, numéro 86, Strasbourg: Centre universitaire d'enseignement du journalisme (CUEJ), Robert Schuman University, January 2006, ISSN 0996-9624
- Collectif (1991), Ronald Hirlé (ed.), Il était une fois le Racing, toute l'histoire du club omnisport strasbourgeois, Berger-Levrault
