= Ravindra Jadeja =

Indian cricketer (born 1988)

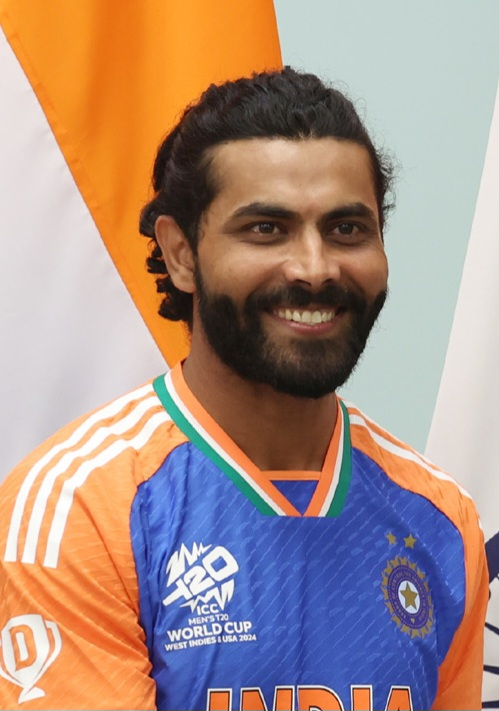
- Jadeja in 2024

Personal information
- Full name: Ravindrasinh Anirudhsinh Jadeja
- Born: 6 December 1988 (age 37); Navagam Ghed, Gujarat, India
- Nickname: Jaddu, Thalapathy
- Height: 1.73 m (5 ft 8 in)
- Batting: Left-handed
- Bowling: Slow left-arm orthodox
- Role: All-rounder
- Relatives: Rivaba Jadeja (wife)

International information
- National side: India (2009–present)
- Test debut (cap 275): 13 December 2012 v England
- Last Test: 22 November 2025 v South Africa
- ODI debut (cap 177): 8 February 2009 v Sri Lanka
- Last ODI: 27 September 2026 v West Indies
- ODI shirt no.: 8 (previously 26)
- T20I debut (cap 22): 10 February 2009 v Sri Lanka
- Last T20I: 29 June 2024 v South Africa
- T20I shirt no.: 8 (previously 88)

Domestic team information
- Years: Team
- 2006–present: Saurashtra
- 2008–2009, 2026–present: Rajasthan Royals
- 2011: Kochi Tuskers Kerala
- 2012–2015, 2018–2025: Chennai Super Kings
- 2016–2017: Gujarat Lions

Career statistics
Competition	Test	ODI	T20I	FC
Matches	89	210	74	147
Runs scored	4,095	2,905	515	8,284
Batting average	38.27	32.27	21.45	45.02
100s/50s	6/27	0/13	0/0	15/45
Top score	175*	87	46*	331
Balls bowled	20,241	10,404	1,356	32,894
Wickets	348	232	54	579
Bowling average	25.11	36.54	29.85	24.29
5 wickets in innings	15	2	0	36
10 wickets in match	3	0	0	10
Best bowling	7/42	5/33	3/15	7/31
Catches/stumpings	49/–	79/–	28/–	100/—
Medal record
Men's cricket
Representing India
ICC World Test Championship
Runner-up	2019–2021
Runner-up	2021–2023
ICC Cricket World Cup
Runner-up	2023 India
ICC T20 World Cup
Winner	2024 West Indies & USA
Runner-up	2014 Bangladesh
ICC Champions Trophy
Winner	2013 England & Wales
Winner	2025 Pakistan
Runner-up	2017 England & Wales
ACC Asia Cup
Winner	2010 Sri Lanka
Winner	2016 Bangladesh
Winner	2018 UAE
Winner	2023 Pakistan
ICC U19 World Cup
Winner	2008 Malaysia
Runner-up	2006 Sri Lanka
- Source: ESPNcricinfo, 18 January 2026

Ravindrasinh Anirudhsinh Jadeja (born 6 December 1988) is an Indian cricketer who represents the India national team currently in ODI and Test formats. He is an all-rounder, who bats left-handed and bowls left-arm orthodox spin. He is widely regarded as one of the greatest all-rounders and among the finest fielders of his generation. He represents Saurashtra in domestic cricket and Rajasthan Royals in the Indian Premier League. Jadeja was a crucial member of the Indian teams that won the 2013 and 2025 ICC Champions Trophy, becoming leading wicket-taker and player of the final in the former and hitting the winning boundary in the latter final. He was also a part of the Indian squad that won the 2024 ICC T20 World Cup, after which he announced his retirement from T20Is.

Jadeja was vice-captain of the Indian U-19 cricket team that won the World Cup in Malaysia in 2008, under the captaincy of former Indian captain Virat Kohli. He made his ODI debut against Sri Lanka on 8 February 2009 and scored an unbeaten 60 off 77 balls in that match. However, his Test debut came almost four years later, on 13 December 2012, against England at Nagpur.

Jadeja was bought for $2 million by the Chennai Super Kings at the 2012 IPL Players Auction. He was bought by the Gujarat Lions in the 2016 IPL Players Auction for ₹9.5 crores after the Chennai Super Kings were banned from the IPL for two seasons. On 22 January 2017, Jadeja became the first Indian left-arm spinner to take 150 One Day International wickets, when he dismissed Sam Billings at Eden Gardens, Kolkata. In March 2017, he became the top ranked bowler in the world leaving behind Ravichandran Ashwin who held that position for a long time. He was announced as captain of the Chennai Super Kings IPL franchise, for the 2022 IPL season, succeeding MS Dhoni. He however stepped down in the middle of the season.

== Early life ==
Jadeja was born on 6 December 1988 in a Gujarati Hindu Rajput family in Navagam Ghed city of Jamnagar district in Gujarat. His father Anirudh was a watchman for a private security agency. His father wanted him to become an Army officer but his interest was in cricket, he was scared of his father in his childhood. His mother Lata died in an accident in 2005 and the trauma of his mother's death almost made him quit cricket. His sister Naina is a nurse. He lives in Jamnagar.

== Domestic career ==
=== Youth career ===
Jadeja made his first Under-19 appearance for India in 2005 at the age of 16. He was picked in the Indian squad for the 2006 U/19 Cricket World Cup in Sri Lanka. India finished runners-up with Jadeja impressing in the final against Pakistan with a haul of three wickets. He was the vice-captain of the victorious Indian team at the 2008 U/19 Cricket World Cup. He played a crucial role with the ball in the tournament, taking 10 wickets in six games at an average of 13.60.

=== First-class cricket ===
Jadeja made his first-class debut in the 2006–07 Duleep Trophy. He played for West Zone in the Duleep Trophy and for Saurashtra in the Ranji Trophy.

In 2012, Jadeja became the eighth player in history, and the first Indian player, to score three first-class triple centuries in his career, joining Don Bradman, Brian Lara, Bill Ponsford, Wally Hammond, WG Grace, Graeme Hick and Mike Hussey. His first came in early November 2011 against Orissa, in which he scored 314 off 375 balls. His second came in November 2012 against Gujarat, in which he scored 303 not out. His third came against Railways in December 2012, in which he scored 331 runs in 501 balls. Jadeja reached this milestone at the young age of only 23.

== International career ==
Jadeja caught the attention of the national selectors with his strong all-round showing in the 2008–09 Ranji Trophy – 42 wickets and 739 runs – and was picked for the ODI series in Sri Lanka. His international debut came in the final match of the series on 8 February 2009, where he scored 60*, although India lost the match. In the 2009 World Twenty20, Jadeja was criticised for not scoring fast enough in India's loss to England. After the incumbent all-rounder Yusuf Pathan suffered a loss of form, Jadeja took his place at No. 7 in the ODI team in late 2009. In the third ODI against Sri Lanka in Cuttack on 21 December 2009, Jadeja was awarded the man of the match award following a haul of four wickets. His best bowling is 4–32.

He made a comeback into the Indian ODI side in the third ODI against England at The Oval in London. Arriving at the crease with India 58–5 after 19 overs, he scored 78, adding 112 with skipper Mahendra Singh Dhoni and 59 off only 5.1 overs with Ravichandran Ashwin to help his side reach 234–7 in 50 overs. He also took 2–42 from his 9 overs and was named "player of the match", but England won the rain-affected game. His performance in the fourth ODI at Lord's was mixed: he gave away four crucial overthrows with a poor throw from the boundary, but then took a catch on the boundary off the last ball.

In the second T20I of the Australian tour in February 2012, Jadeja had figures of 1/16 in 3 overs and effected two run outs in the Australian innings. India went on to win the game and Jadeja was awarded Man of the Match, mainly for his fielding effort.

After his impressive performance at the start of Ranji Trophy season 2012–13, when he scored two 300+ scores in 4 matches (4/125 and then 303* against Gujarat at Surat; 331 and 3/109 against Railways at Rajkot in the Ranji Trophy 2012–13), he was called up to join the 15-member India Test team to play the fourth Test against England at Nagpur. In his Test debut against England at Nagpur, he bowled 70 overs and picked 3/117.

During the second ODI in the India-England series at Kochi, Jadeja hit 61 off just 37 balls, which took India to a total of 285. In the second innings, he bowled a spell of 2 for 12 in 7 overs, helping India beat England by 127 runs and level the series 1–1. This performance earned Jadeja the Man of the Match award.

In the historic 4–0 home Test series win against Australia in February–March 2013, Jadeja took 24 wickets, dismissing the Australian captain Michael Clarke five out of six times in the series which cemented his place in the team as an all-rounder, despite not contributing much with the bat. His seven-wicket haul, including a five-for in the second innings of the final Test match, earned him the Man of the Match award. He played an important role for India in lifting the ICC Champions Trophy 2013. He was the highest wicket-taker of the tournament with 12 wickets, which won him the Golden Ball. He made 33* with bat and took 2 wickets in the final against England. He was also named as part of the 'Team of the Tournament' by the ICC and ESPNcricinfo.

He was ranked as the No.1 bowler in ODI cricket by the ICC in August 2013. Jadeja was the first India bowler to top the rankings since Anil Kumble, who topped the table in 1996. He is the fourth India bowler after Kapil Dev, Maninder Singh and Kumble to be ranked No.1.

Jadeja scored his maiden Test fifty on 20 July 2014, playing against England and saving the match for India, who were struggling at 235/7. He made 68 runs from just 57 balls. His partnership of 99 with Bhuvneshwar Kumar helped India set England a target of 319.

Jadeja was selected for the 2015 Cricket World Cup in Australia and New Zealand despite not being fully fit due to a shoulder injury. He took 9 wickets in 8 games. His returns with the bat were modest, scoring just 57 runs from 5 innings. India went on to lose against Australia in the semi-final. After his poor performance in the next ODI series in Bangladesh, he was dropped from the Indian team.

Jadeja returned strongly in the next Ranji season (2015–16), where he picked up 38 wickets from four games and 215 runs, including three 50+ scores. His strong performances were rewarded with selection for the Indian Test side facing South Africa at home. Jadeja helped his team achieve victory, by taking 23 wickets in 4 games. He scored 109 runs in the series, which included crucial knocks lower down the order. Jadeja was included in Indian limited-overs side touring Australia to play five ODIs and three T20Is. In the ODIs, Jadeja bowled economically in a series where more than 3,000 runs were scored in five matches. He took three wickets at an economy rate of 5.35. He was the second-highest wicket-taker in T20Is, picking up five wickets in three games. In the second game of the series, Jadeja took a great catch off his own bowling to get the important wicket of Shane Watson, and he also ran Aaron Finch out, who was batting on 74 at that moment.

During Australia's Test tour of India in 2017, Jadeja featured in all four Tests against the tourists. He took 25 wickets and made two half-centuries down the order, which earned him the player of the match in the fourth Test as well as the player of the series award.

He along with Ravichandran Ashwin, became the first pair of spinners to be jointly ranked number 1 bowler in ICC Test Rankings history. On 5 August 2017, Jadeja became the fastest left-arm bowler to reach 150 wickets in terms of number of Tests played (32).

On 5 October 2018, he scored his first century in Tests. In March 2019, during the second ODI against Australia, Jadeja became the third cricketer for India to score 2,000 runs and take 150 wickets in ODIs. In April 2019, he was named in India's squad for the 2019 Cricket World Cup.

In October 2019, in the first Test against South Africa, Jadeja took his 200th wicket in Test cricket.

On 6 August 2021, batting during the first innings of the first Test against England at Trent Bridge, Jadeja became the fifth Indian and fifth-fastest player score 2,000 runs and take 200 wickets in Tests.

In September 2021, Jadeja was named in India's squad for the 2021 ICC Men's T20 World Cup. His spin-bowling partner on many occasions, R Ashwin, was also named in the squad after 4 years out of the white-ball team.

On 5 March 2022, in a Test match against Sri Lanka, Jadeja scored 175* setting an Indian Test record for the highest score made by a No. 7 or lower, breaking the 36-year-old record of Kapil Dev. He then took 5/41 and then 4/46 in the two innings, registering match figures of 9/87 to help India beat Sri Lanka by an innings and 222 runs.

He scored his first overseas century in the fifth Test match of the 2022 Indian tour of England.

In July 2022, he was named as India's vice-captain for the away ODI series against the West Indies.

In September 2022, Jadeja was named in the Indian squad for the 2022 ICC Men's T20 World Cup but was unable to play due to a severe knee injury. Following a five-month recovery, Jadeja returned to the test squad for the home edition of the Border–Gavaskar Trophy on 9 February in Nagpur, where he achieved a Five-wicket haul. Jadeja Becomes Fastest Indian to Take 250 Wickets and Score 2500+ Runs in Test Cricket.

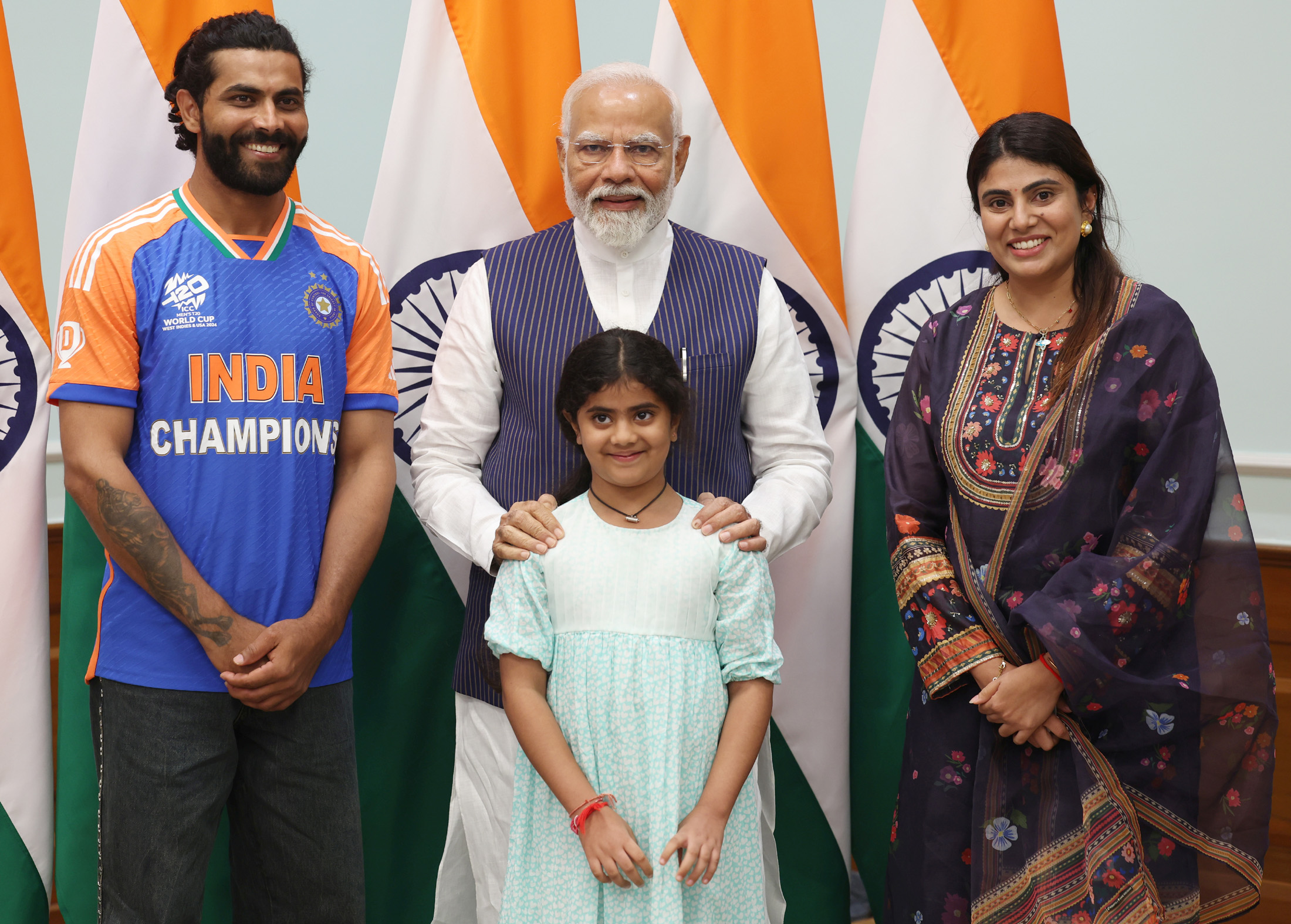
Jadeja family meeting Narendra Modi in 2024

In May 2024, he was named in India's squad for the 2024 ICC Men's T20 World Cup tournament.

== Indian Premier League ==
Ravindra Jadeja was selected by the Rajasthan Royals for the inaugural season of the Indian Premier League (IPL) in 2008, and played an important role in their victory (Royals defeated Chennai Super Kings in the final). Jadeja scored 135 runs from 14 matches at a strike rate of 131.06, his best score being 36* against Kings XI Punjab. He did even better in 2009, scoring 295 runs at a strike rate of 110.90, and conceding fewer than 6.5 runs per over. Shane Warne, the captain of Rajasthan Royals, referred to Jadeja as a "superstar in the making". Warne also nicknamed him "Rockstar".

Jadeja sat out the 2010 IPL because of a ban arising from contractual irregularities. In 2011, he was bought by the Kochi Tuskers Kerala for $950,000. Kochi Tuskers were terminated from the IPL in September 2011, and in the 2012 IPL player auction, Jadeja was bought by Chennai Super Kings for $2 million (approx. Rs. 9.8 crores at that time) after a tie-breaker with Deccan Chargers who bid the same amount. Jadeja was the most expensive player of the year's auction. He won the Man of the Match award in the second match of the season against Deccan Chargers for his all-round performance (48 runs off 29 balls, 5/16 in 4 overs).

For his performances in 2014, he was named in the ESPNcricinfo CLT20 XI.

In a Mother's Day game during IPL 2015, Jadeja put in a fine spin bowling performance in Chennai; he took four wickets for 11 runs with a brilliant spell of bowling against Rajasthan Royals.

In the 19th match of the 2021 Indian Premier League, Jadeja hit 62*, including a joint-highest ever 37 runs in the last over bowled by Harshal Patel. He later took 3/13 in his four overs and was named Man of the Match.

Jadeja was appointed as the captain for the Chennai Super Kings ahead of the 2022 IPL season, after MS Dhoni step down as captain. He however stepped down in the middle of the season, handing over the captaincy back to Dhoni. He was later ruled out of the tournament due to a rib injury. Jadeja and the franchise later unfollowed each other on Instagram, leading to reports about a rift. But the CEO of CSK maintained that he was ruled out on medical advice, and denied allegations of the rift.

In the final of the 2023 Indian Premier League final, Chennai Super Kings required 10 from the final two balls. Jadeja hit a 6 and 4 to give CSK the title.

Ahead of the 2026 season, Jadeja rejoined the Rajasthan Royals via a trade deal with CSK.

== Personal life ==
Jadeja married Rivaba Solanki on 17 April 2016. They have a daughter born in June 2017. Rivaba is an MLA from Gujarat, representing the Bharatiya Janata Party. His sister and father are members of the Indian National Congress.

== Media image ==
Jadeja's contributions in India's 4–0 test series win over Australia in February and March 2013 were praised in the media, and Gavaskar called him one of the architects of the win. Jadeja's dominance of Clarke was also praised in the media. Jadeja was named Player of the Week by the portal Cricket World after the end of the fourth test.

Since his performance at the 2009 ICC World Twenty20 event, Jadeja has been a consistent target of sarcasm and jokes on cricket portals and by Indian cricket fans. On Twitter and Facebook, he is jokingly referred to as Sir Ravindra Jadeja since an online joke calling him the same went viral. When Jadeja was out clean bowled for 16 while not offering a shot in the February 2013 Chennai test against Australia, a cricket portal described his dismissal as "Jadeja falls 284 runs short of what would have been a fourth first-class triple-century". Following his good performance against Australia in the 2013 test series, there was a flurry of Jadeja jokes on Twitter comparing him to Rajinikanth. His Wikipedia article was temporarily vandalized to mock him. In April 2013, Mahendra Singh Dhoni, Suresh Raina and Ravichandran Ashwin, teammates of Jadeja in Chennai Super Kings, tweeted several Jadeja jokes on Twitter, in one of which Dhoni referred to him as Sri Sri Pandit Sir Lord Ravindra Jadeja. In response, Jadeja said in April 2013 that it was a joke which everybody was enjoying, and that he had no problem with the prefix Sir.

For his flamboyancy with bat, ball and while fielding, Jadeja is often nicknamed 'Rockstar', as he was originally called by Shane Warne. His IPL jersey has the name 'Jaddu' on the back rather than Jadeja, and Dhoni can often be heard calling him this from behind the stumps. Jadeja's sword celebration has been a popular feature of world cricket over the years, as he usually brings this out after scoring a 50 or a 100. Though, he has often been criticised for his caste reference regarding the sword celebration.

During the 2019 Cricket World Cup, commentator Sanjay Manjrekar criticised Jadeja by calling him a 'bits and pieces player'. The former apologised after Jadeja's performance at the tournament.

== Awards ==
- ICC ODI Team of the Year: 2013, 2016
- Madhavrao Scindia Award for most wickets in Ranji Trophy: 2008–09
- Ranked 1st in ICC Top 10 Test all-rounders (2021)
- Arjuna Award: 2019
