= Andranomafana =

- Location in Madagascar
- Coordinates: 22°2′S 44°20′E
- Country: Madagascar
- Region: Atsimo-Andrefana
- District: Ankazoabo
- Elevation: 319 m (1,047 ft)

Population (2001)
  - Total: 6,000
- Time zone: UTC3 (EAT)

Andranomafana is a town and commune (Malagasy: kaominina) in Madagascar. It belongs to the district of Ankazoabo, which is a part of Atsimo-Andrefana Region. The population of the commune was estimated to be approximately 6,000 in 2001 commune census.

Only primary schooling is available. The majority 55% of the population of the commune are farmers, while an additional 44% receives their livelihood from raising livestock. The most important crop is cassava, while other important products are maize and rice. Services provide employment for 1% of the population.
