= Tandrano =

- Location in Madagascar
- Coordinates: 22°5′S 44°38′E
- Country: Madagascar
- Region: Atsimo-Andrefana
- District: Ankazoabo
- Elevation: 401 m (1,316 ft)

Population (2001)
  - Total: 9,000
- Time zone: UTC3 (EAT)

Tandrano is a town and commune (Malagasy: kaominina) in Madagascar. It belongs to the district of Ankazoabo, which is a part of Atsimo-Andrefana Region. The population was 9,000 in 2001 commune census.

Only primary schooling is available. The majority 52% of the population of the commune are farmers. 45% raise livestock. The most important crop is rice, while other important products are maize and cassava. Services provide employment for 1% of the population. Fishing employs 2% of the population.
