= Alwin Albert Hafner =

- Diocese: Roman Catholic Diocese of Morombe, Madagascar

Personal details
- Born: September 11, 1930 Balsthal, Canton of Solothurn, Switzerland
- Died: January 7, 2016 (aged 85) Ruswil, Canton of Lucerne, Switzerland

Alwin Albert Hafner (MSF) (11 September 1930 – 7 January 2016) was a Roman Catholic bishop.

Ordained to the priesthood in 1957, Hafner served as bishop of the Roman Catholic Diocese of Morombe, Madagascar from 1989 to 2000.
