= Ankazoabo (district) =

- Location in Madagascar
- Coordinates: 21°30′S 45°12′E
- Country: Madagascar
- Region: Atsimo-Andrefana
- District: Ankazoabo

Area
  - Total: 8,834 km^{2} (3,411 sq mi)
- Elevation: 399 m (1,309 ft)

Population (2015)
  - Total: 67,337
  - Ethnicities: Bara
- Time zone: UTC3 (EAT)

Ankazoabo is a district in Atsimo-Andrefana Region, Madagascar, with a population of 71,400. 10700 ha of the district are cultivated. An airport serves within the district.

== Communes ==
The district is further divided into five communes:

- Andranomafana
- Ankazoabo
- Ántevamena
- Berenty
- Tandrano
