= Berenty =

- Location in Madagascar
- Coordinates: 22°10′S 45°4′E
- Country: Madagascar
- Region: Atsimo-Andrefana
- District: Ankazoabo
- Elevation: 399 m (1,309 ft)

Population (2001)
  - Total: 1,000
  - Ethnicities: Bara
- Time zone: UTC3 (EAT)

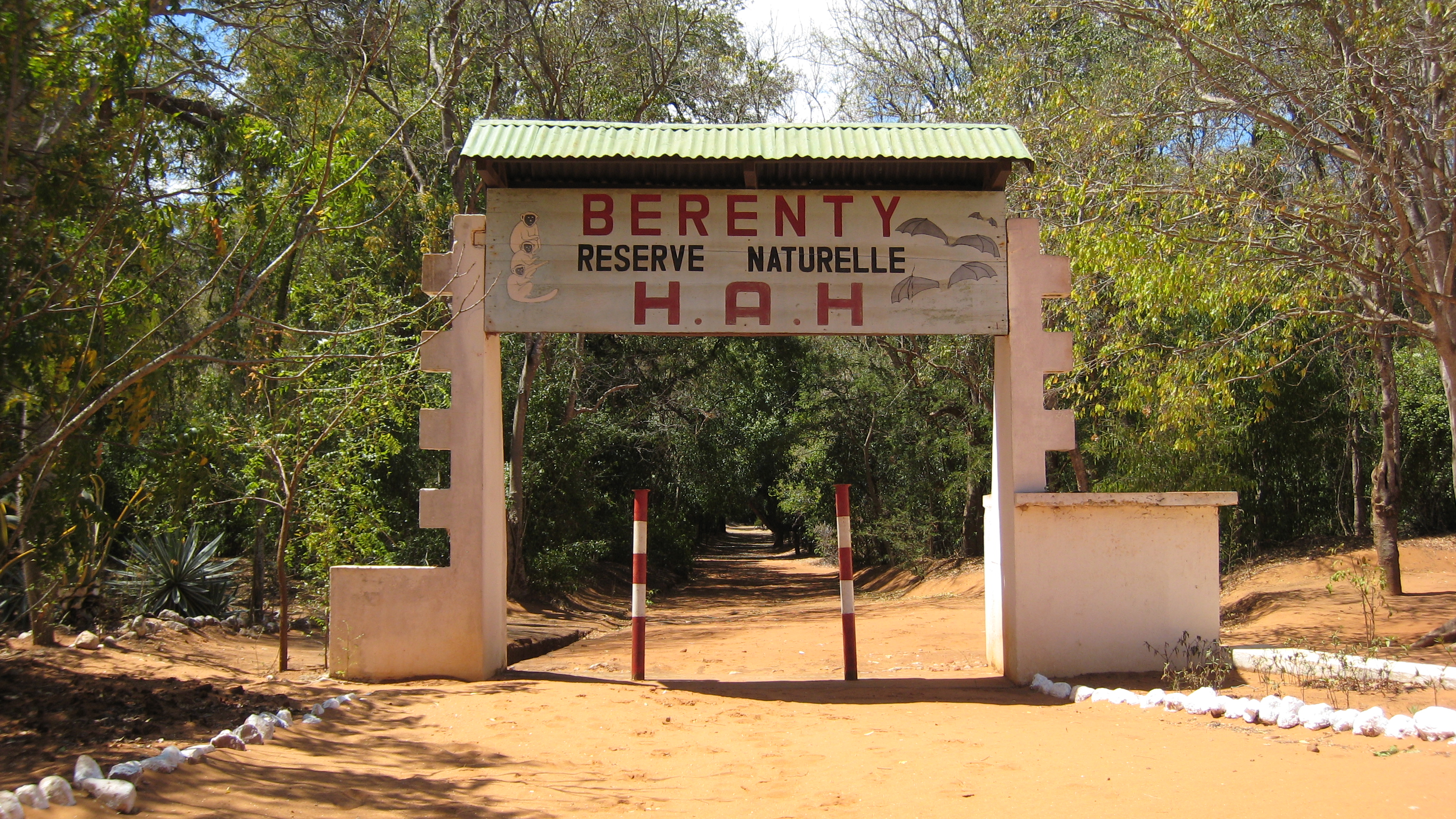
The Berenty Reserve in Berenty

Berenty is a town and commune (Malagasy: kaominina) in Madagascar. It belongs to the district of Ankazoabo, which is a part of Atsimo-Andrefana Region. The population of the commune was estimated to be approximately 1,000 in 2001 commune census.

Primary and junior level secondary education are available in town. The majority 50% of the population of the commune are farmers, while an additional 49% receives their livelihood from raising livestock. The most important crop is rice, while other important products are peanuts and cassava. Services provide employment for 1% of the population.

== See also ==
- Berenty Reserve
