= Ántevamena =

Human settlement in Madagascar

Coordinates: 22°20′S 44°32′E

Ántevamena is a rural town in the region of Atsimo-Andrefana, Madagascar.
