= Ankazoabo =

- Location in Madagascar
- Coordinates: 21°30′S 45°12′E
- Country: Madagascar
- Region: Atsimo-Andrefana
- District: Ankazoabo

Area
  - Total: 8,834 km^{2} (3,411 sq mi)
- Elevation: 399 m (1,309 ft)

Population (2015)
  - Total: 67,337
  - Ethnicities: Bara
- Time zone: UTC3 (EAT)

Ankazoabo is a town in Atsimo-Andrefana Region, Madagascar and the capital of its namesake district Ankazoabo (district).

An airport serves the town.
