= Perri Pierre =

American filmmaker

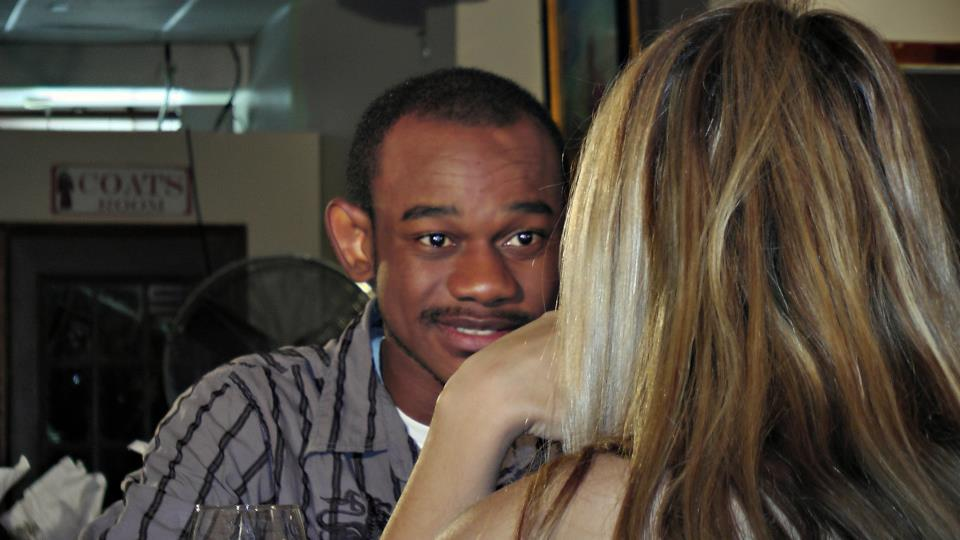
- Pierre on set for Three of One Kind
- Born: December 28, 1988 (age 37); New York City, United States
- Education: Queens College (B.A.); Pepperdine University (M.F.A.)
- Occupations: Actor, filmmaker
- Years active: 2009–present
- Website: perripierre.com

Perri Pierre (born December 28, 1988) is an American filmmaker and actor of Haitian descent.

== Biography ==
Pierre was born in Brooklyn, New York City and grew up in Les Cayes, Haiti. After studying drama and theatre at Queens College, he decided to focus solely on film.

In 2011, he wrote, directed, and starred in his first production, J-12, which aired on national television in 2013. He produced and starred in his second production, Three of One Kind, with which he won his first award, a People's Choice Award from the International Movie Trailer Festival.

In February 2013, Pierre starred in and produced Addiction, which was released in select theaters in New York and Los Angeles that summer. The DVD came out on Amazon.com on February 11, 2014.

== Filmography ==
Acting credits

Year	Title	Details	Broadcast
2018	King of the Blue Ridge	Production	
2013	Addiction (short film)	Completed	In Select Theaters in Los Angeles and New York
2013	Three of One Kind (feature film)	Completed	Film Festivals
2011	J-12	Completed	Film Festivals & National TV Program (BadamiTV)
2009	Law & Order: SVU – "Sugar"	Completed	National TV
2009	Cupid	Completed	TV

== Awards ==
- 2012 International Movie Trailer Festival – People's Choice Award – J-12
- 2014 Nollywood and African People's Choice Awards – Favorite Short Film – J-12
- 2016 Black Reel Awards – Exceptional Independent Short Film – Addiction
