= Vincent Sattler =

French footballer (1969–1988)

Personal information
- Date of birth: 6 June 1969
- Place of birth: Strasbourg, France
- Date of death: 22 December 1988 (aged 19)
- Place of death: Dahlenheim, France
- Height: 1.87 m (6 ft 2 in)
- Position: Centre-back

Youth career
- –1987: Strasbourg

Senior career*
Years	Team	Apps	(Gls)
1987–1988	Strasbourg	36	(5)
- * Club domestic league appearances and goals

Vincent Sattler (6 June 1969 – 22 December 1988) was a French professional footballer who played as a centre-back. He played for Strasbourg before dying due to a car accident at the age of 19.

== Career ==
Sattler signed a professional contract with Strasbourg in June 1986. In the 1987–88 season, the club achieved promotion to the Division 1 by winning the Division 2. Sattler was then a great prospect of French football. He would make a total of 40 appearances and score 6 goals for Strasbourg in his short-lived career.

== Personal life and death ==
On 22 December 1988, Sattler died in a car accident. He was driving on the road between the towns of Furdenheim and Ergersheim after a night spent with some of his Strasbourg teammates. In the time period prior to his death, he was completing his military service at the Bataillon de Joinville. After Sattler's death, the municipal stadium of Dahlenheim was named after him.

== Career statistics ==
Appearances and goals by club, season and competition
Club	Season	League			Cup		Total	
Club	Season	Division	Apps	Goals	Apps	Goals	Apps	Goals
Strasbourg	1986–87	Division 2	1	0	0	0	1	0
Strasbourg	1987–88	Division 2	14	1	4	1	18	2
Strasbourg	1988–89	Division 1	21	4	0	0	21	4
Career total			36	5	4	1	40	6

== Honours ==
Strasbourg

- Division 2: 1987–88
