= Johnson-Grace =

Defunct American data compression company

- Type: Private (1992–1996); subsidiary (1996)
- Industry: Data compression, imaging software
- Founded: 1992; 34 years ago in Newport Beach, California, United States
- Founder: Steve Johnson; Chris Grace
- Defunct: 1996
- Fate: Acquired by AOL, 1996
- Headquarters: Newport Beach, California, United States
- Products: ART image compression
- Parent: AOL (1996)

Johnson-Grace was a data compression and imaging software company based in Newport Beach, California, founded in 1992 by Steve Johnson and Chris Grace. The company is best known for developing the ART image file format, a highly compressed image format used by AOL to deliver graphics efficiently to users on slow dial-up connections. AOL acquired Johnson-Grace on 1 February 1996 for approximately 1.6 million shares of AOL stock.

== History ==
Johnson and Grace founded the company in 1992 initially to develop spreadsheet technology for simulation modelling. The founders subsequently consulted Irving Reed at the University of Southern California, who had conceived an improved image compression algorithm. Developing Reed's algorithm became the company's primary focus, resulting in the ART image file format.

The ART format achieved high compression ratios compared to JPEG and was suited to the limited bandwidth of the dial-up modem connections that the majority of early internet users relied upon. AOL adopted the format for delivering images within its service, where the reduced file sizes meaningfully shortened download times for members.

AOL acquired Johnson-Grace on 1 February 1996. The ART format subsequently became a proprietary component of the AOL client software, used to compress images downloaded by AOL members. The format was eventually phased out as broadband connections made aggressive compression less necessary.
