= Joseph Zimmermann (engineer) =

Joseph Zimmermann (1912 – March 31, 2004) was an engineer, born in Kenosha, Wisconsin who invented the first answering machine, called the "Electronic Secretary". Zimmermann graduated from Marquette University in 1935 with a degree in electrical engineering. He served in the U.S. Army Signal Corps during World War II and was among the first soldiers to land on Omaha Beach in Normandy, France, as part of the D-Day invasion. In addition to the patent on the telephone answering machine (1948), Zimmermann held dozens of other patents, including a security device that automatically dials a phone number and conveys information in case of an emergency; a magnetic recorder used to monitor heart patients; a system for accessing prerecorded lectures to earn college credit; an airport system to send out landing information to planes 24 hours a day. Zimmermann and his wife, Helen, had a son, Joseph.
