= Vittoria Titomanlio =

Italian politician (1899–1988)

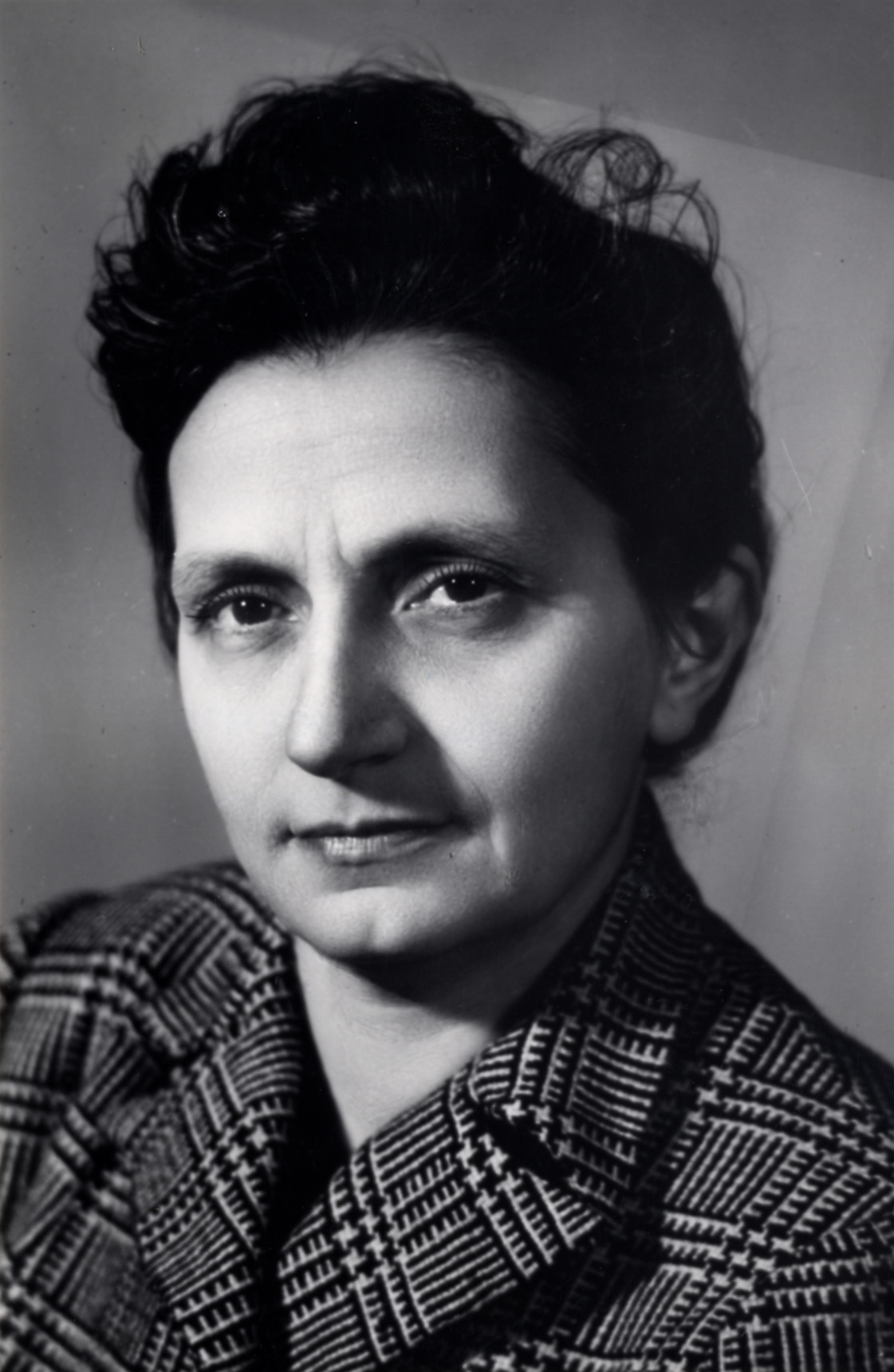
- Official portrait, 1948

Member of the Chamber of Deputies
- In office 1948–1968
- Constituency: Naples

Member of the Constituent Assembly
- In office 1946–1948
- Constituency: Naples

Personal details
- Born: 22 April 1899 Barletta, Kingdom of Italy
- Died: 28 December 1988 (aged 89) Naples, Italy
- Occupation: Politician

Vittoria Titomanlio (22 April 1899 – 28 December 1988) was an Italian politician. She was elected to the Constituent Assembly in 1946 as one of the first group of women parliamentarians in Italy. She subsequently served in the Chamber of Deputies from 1948 to 1968.

== Biography ==
Titomanlio was born in Barletta in 1899 to Carolina De Boffe and Sabino Titomanlio. After graduating with a master's degree, she became a primary school teacher. She joined the young women's section of Azione Cattolica, rising to become a member of its superior council. After 1943 she became provincial secretary of the Christian Associations of Italian Workers and sat on the council of the Italian Association of Catholic Teachers.

Following the war, Titomanlio was a Christian Democracy (DC) candidate in Naples in the 1946 general elections, in which she was one of 21 women elected to the Constituent Assembly. She was elected to the Chamber of Deputies in 1948 and was re-elected in 1953, 1958 and 1963, serving until 1968.

She died in Naples in 1988.
