= The Boy Who Fell Out of the Sky =

Book by Ken Dornstein

- First hardcover edition
- Author: Ken Dornstein
- Language: English
- Published: 2006 (Sceptre)
- Publication place: U.S.
- Pages: 368
- ISBN: 978-0340899663

The Boy Who Fell Out of the Sky is a 2006 memoir by Ken Dornstein about his older brother David Dornstein, who was killed in the Pan Am 103 bombing on December 21st, 1988. David had dreamed of becoming a great writer, but died at the age of 25 without having published anything. The Boy Who Fell Out of the Sky traces Ken's attempts in the years after the crash to know and understand his older brother David through research, interviews, and David's own writings: letters, drafts, and notebooks filled with "...random thoughts, poems, dream images, bizarre theories, pretend interviews, scalding self-critical passages, and the outlines of impossibly grandiose projects."

David and Ken Dornstein grew up in Pennsylvania; David was six years older than Ken. After graduating from high school, David attended Brown University. At the time of David's death, stories circulated David was carrying with him on the plane, "...the manuscript of a brilliant novel eagerly awaited by an American publisher", but in fact "...there was no great novel, and there was never going to be one." Ken spent several years collecting, organizing, and compiling the archive of his brother's writings, and traveled through the United States, Libya, Scotland, and The Netherlands to write the story of David's life and death.

In a college writing class, David once wrote, "the first draft of a work he thought might be his ticket to immortality. It would be a fictional autobiography, the story of an unknown young writer who dies in a plane crash, leaving behind a cache of papers and notebooks that the narrator stitches together into the story of the writer's life. Someone else, it turns out, lived to write that book."

In 2007, Warner Brothers announced the production of a film adaptation of the book, to be adapted and directed by Niki Caro.

== Reviews ==
Gilbert Cruz of Entertainment Weekly called the book, "half an account of Ken's life-halting obsession with reconstructing his mythical older brother, and half the biography that David always expected as a soon-to-be-famous author." Matthew Sweet of The Independent wrote, "Ken Dornstein's project—his researches and the book that they have become—is both a loving tribute to the memory of his dead brother and an act of destruction and erasure... This book is an act of love, but it is also an expression of the power of sibling rivalry." In Literary Review, Kathy Watson called Ken's book, “...an eloquent memoir of [David’s] short life and fragmented writing, and a testament to the power of love.” Carla Blumenkranz of The Village Voice wrote, "This is not a book to be read twice: It hurts too much, and it's not to be forgotten." Louise Carpenter of The Telegraph said, "The Boy Who Fell Out of the Sky is accomplished in so many ways: part thriller; part elegy; part biography; part meditation on grief. The technicalities of the story – the crash, the trial of the Libyans 10 years later - are handled with a reporter's precision. But more than anything else, (Ken) Dornstein is a wonderful writer. His brother David wanted to be a great writer. [David] died too soon for us to know if he ever would have been."
