= Joseph Zimmermann (bishop) =

Malagasy Roman Catholic bishop

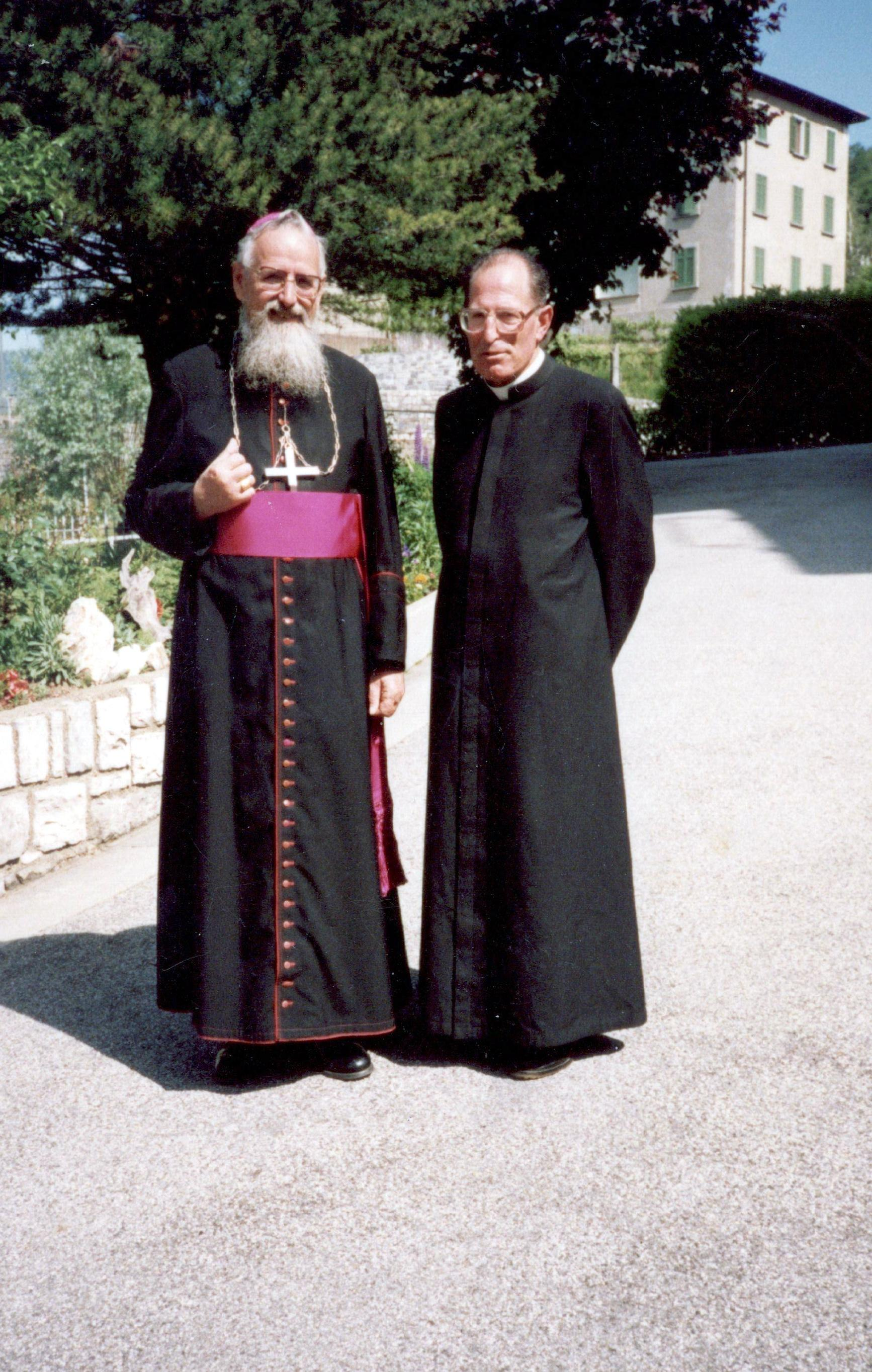
- Joseph Zimmermann MSF (left) with Vittorio Nussbaumer MSF in 1986

Personal details
- Born: 12 December 1923 Birmenstorf, Aargau, Switzerland
- Died: 4 December 1988 (aged 64)

Diocese of Morombe

Joseph Zimmermann (M.S.F.) (12 December 1923 – 4 December 1988) was a Swiss Catholic prelate who served as bishop of the Roman Catholic Diocese of Morombe in Madagascar.

Zimmermann was born in Birmenstorf, Aargau, Switzerland, and attended the College du Christ-Roi in Nuolen. A member of the Missionaries of the Holy Family, he made his first vows in 1945 and was ordained to the priesthood in 1950. In 1955 he began working as a missionary in Madagascar.

In 1960, Pope John XXIII created the Roman Catholic Diocese of Morombe and named Zimmermann its bishop. Zimmermann was the first Swiss member of the Missionaries of the Holy Family to be made bishop. He was consecrated on 23 October by Franz von Streng, with Paul Joseph Girouard and Johannes Anton Vonderach as principal co-consecrators. On 20 November he was installed at the cathedral in Morombe. As of 1965, the diocese of Morombe contained approximately 121,000 people, 10,000 of whom were Catholic.

In 1988 Zimmermann died in office after suffering a fall. His body is buried in Morombe.
