= Navagam Ghed =

- city
- Location in Gujarat, India Navagam Ghed (India)
- Coordinates: 22.515253°N 70.071287°E
- Country: India
- State: Gujarat
- District: Jamnagar

Population (2001)
  - Total: 39,483

Languages
  - Official: Gujarati, Hindi
- Time zone: UTC+5:30 (IST)
- Vehicle registration: GJ-10
- Website: gujaratindia.com

Navagam Ghed is a city and a municipality in Jamnagar district in the Indian state of Gujarat.

== Demographics ==
As of 2001 India census, Navagam Ghed had a population of 39,483. Males constitute 52% of the population and females 48%. Navagam Ghed has an average literacy rate of 72%, higher than the national average of 59.5%: male literacy is 77%, and female literacy is 67%. In Navagam Ghed, 12% of the population is under 6 years of age.
