= Félix Ramananarivo =

Malagasy Roman Catholic bishop (1934–2013)

Félix Ramananarivo M.S.
- Bishop of Antsirabe
- Church: Catholic Church
- Diocese: Diocese of Antsirabe
- In office: 11 November 1994 – 13 November 2009
- Predecessor: Philibert Randriambololona
- Successor: Philippe Ranaivomanana

Orders
- Ordination: 14 August 1965
- Consecration: 18 June 1995 by Jean-Guy Rakodondravahatra

Personal details
- Born: 19 May 1934 Belanitra, Antananarivo Province, Colony of Madagascar and Dependencies, French Empire
- Died: 12 May 2013 (aged 78)

Félix Ramananarivo (19 May 1934 – 12 May 2013) was a Malagasy Roman Catholic bishop of the Diocese of Antsirabe, Madagascar. Ordained in 1965, Ramananarivo was named bishop in 1994 and retired in 2009.

== See also ==
- Catholic Church in Madagascar
