= Jean-Guy Rakodondravahatra =

Malagasy Catholic bishop (1934–1996)

Jean-Guy Rakodondravahatra M.S.
- Bishop of Ihosy
- Church: Catholic Church
- Diocese: Diocese of Ihosy
- In office: 25 March 1972 – 21 September 1996
- Predecessor: Luigi Dusio
- Successor: Philippe Ranaivomanana

Orders
- Ordination: 19 July 1960
- Consecration: 2 July 1972 by Claude Rolland

Personal details
- Born: 2 February 1934 Tsarahonenana, Mahajanga Province, Colony of Madagascar and Dependencies, French Empire
- Died: 21 September 1996 (aged 62)

Jean-Guy Rakodondravahatra (born 2 February 1934, in Tsarahonenana; died 21 September 1996) was a Malagasy bishop and prelate for the Roman Catholic Diocese of Ihosy. He was appointed bishop in 1972.

== See also ==
- Catholic Church in Madagascar
