= Fulgence Razakarivony =

Malagasy Catholic bishop

Fulgence Razakarivony M.S.
- Bishop of Ihosy
- Church: Catholic Church
- Diocese: Diocese of Ihosy
- Appointed: 16 July 2011
- Predecessor: Philippe Ranaivomanana

Orders
- Ordination: 8 August 1993
- Consecration: 6 November 2011 by Philippe Ranaivomanana

Personal details
- Born: 16 August 1963 (age 62) Betsiholany, Ambohimiarivo, Antananarivo Province, Malagasy Republic

Fulgence Razakarivony (born 16 August 1963 in Betsiholany) is a Malagasy clergyman and prelate for the Roman Catholic Diocese of Ihosy. He was appointed bishop in 2011.

== See also ==
- Catholic Church in Madagascar
