= Diocese of Antsirabe =

Roman Catholic diocese in Madagascar

Coordinates: 19.8706°S 47.0352°E

Diocese of Antsirabe Dioecesis Antsirabensis
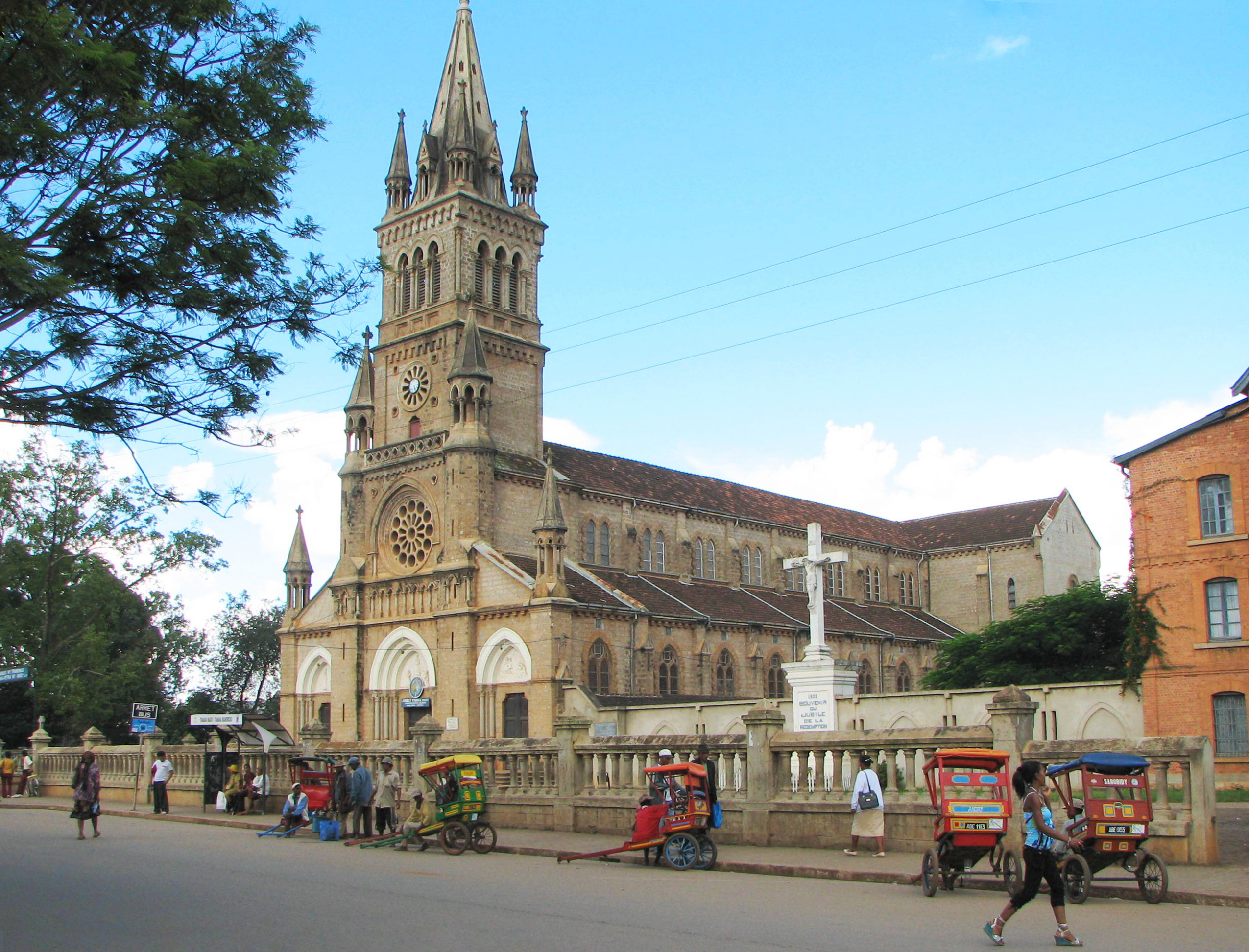
- Our Lady of La Salette Cathedral

Location
- Country: Madagascar
- Metropolitan: Antananarivo

Statistics
- Area: 16,000 km^{2} (6,200 sq mi)
- Population: Total; Catholics: (as of 2006); 1,355,000; 799,574 (59.0%)

Information
- Rite: Latin Rite
- Cathedral: Our Lady of La Salette Cathedral

Current leadership
- Pope: Leo XIV
- Bishop: Jean Pascal Andriantsoavina (nominiated 10/07/2023)

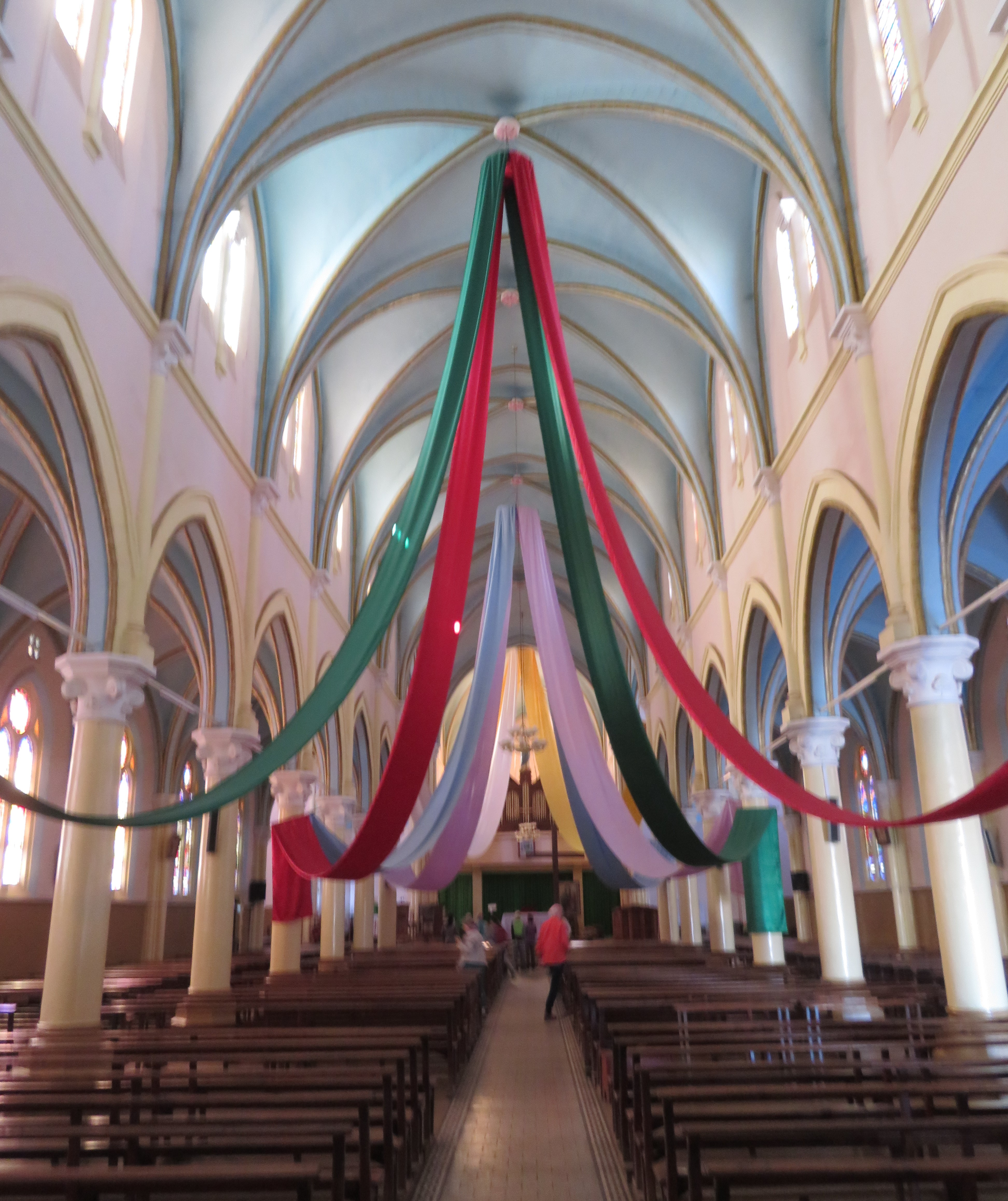
Interior of the Cathedral

The Roman Catholic Diocese of Antsirabe (Latin: Antsiraben(sis)) is a Latin suffragan diocese in the ecclesiastical province of Antananarivo (one of five in Madagascar; in the national capital), yet depends on the missionary Roman Congregation for the Evangelization of Peoples.

Its cathedral episcopal see is the (Marian) Cathédrale Notre-Dame-de-la-Salette, in the city of Antsirabe, Antananarivo Province.

== Statistics ==
As per 2014, it pastorally served 892,713 Catholics (45.4% of 1,967,703 total) on 16,000 km^{2} in 29 parishes and 2 missions with 125 priests (64 diocesan, 61 religious), 519 lay religious (198 brothers, 321 sisters) and 74 seminarians.

== History ==
- Established on May 15, 1913 as Apostolic Prefecture of Betafo, on Malagassy territory split off from the then Apostolic Vicariate of Central Madagascar.
- Promoted on August 24, 1918 as Apostolic Vicariate of Betafo, hence entitled to a titular bishop.
- Renamed on January 10, 1921 as Apostolic Vicariate of Antsirabe after its new see.
- Promoted on September 14, 1955 as Diocese of Antsirabe.

== Bishops ==
=== Ordinaries ===
(Roman Rite, mostly members of missionary Latin congregations)

Apostolic Prefect of Betafó

- Father François-Joseph Dantin, Missionaries of Our Lady of LaSalette (M.S.) (born France) (1913.06.24 – 1918.08.24 see below)

Apostolic Vicars of Betafo

- François-Joseph Dantin, M.S. (see above 1918.08.24 – 1921.01.10 see below), Titular Bishop of Satala in Armenia (1918.08.24 – death 1941.07.05)

Apostolic Vicars of Antsirabe

- François-Joseph Dantin, M.S. (see above 1921.01.10 – death 1941.07.05)
- Édouard Rostaing, M.S. (born France) (1942.02.24 – death 1946.05.18), Titular Bishop of Curium (1942.02.24 – 1946.05.18)
- Joseph-Paul Futy, M.S. (born France) (1947.02.13 – death 1955.03), Titular Bishop of Aspendus (1947.02.13 – 1956.08.12); previously Apostolic Prefect of Morondava (Madagascar) (1938 – 1947.02.13)

Suffragan Bishops of Antsirabe

- Claude Rolland, M.S. (born France) (1955.12.19 – death 1973.10.15)
- Jean-Maria Rakotondrasoa, M.S. (first native incumbent) (1974.02.28 – retired 1989.06.19), died 2002
- Philibert Randriambololona, Society of Jesus (S.J.) (1989.06.19 – 1992.12.17), succeeding as previous Coadjutor Bishop of Antsirabé (1988.09.01 – 1989.06.19); later Metropolitan Archbishop of Fianarantsoa (Madagascar) (1992.12.17 – retired 2002.10.01), died 2018
- Félix Ramananarivo, M.S. (1994.11.11 – retired 2009.11.13), died 2013
- Philippe Ranaivomanana (2009.11.13 – death 2022.09.06), previously Bishop of Ihosy (Madagascar) (1999.01.02 – 2009.11.14)

=== Coadjutor Bishop ===
- Philibert Randriambololona, S.J. (1988-1989)

=== Other priest of this diocese who became bishop ===
- Désiré Tsarahazana, appointed Bishop of Fenoarivo Atsinanana in 2000; future Cardinal

== See also ==
- List of Roman Catholic dioceses in Madagascar
- Roman Catholicism in Madagascar

== Sources and external links ==
- GCatholic.org
- Catholic Hierarchy
