= Ampitana =

- Location in Madagascar
- Coordinates: 21°8′S 47°13′E
- Country: Madagascar
- Region: Haute Matsiatra
- District: Ambohimahasoa

Area
  - Total: 144 km^{2} (56 sq mi)
- Elevation: 1,189 m (3,901 ft)

Population (2001)
  - Total: 10,000
- Time zone: UTC3 (EAT)
- Postal code: 305

Ampitana is a rural municipality in Madagascar. It belongs to the district of Ambohimahasoa, which is a part of Haute Matsiatra Region. The population of the commune was estimated to be approximately 10,000 in 2001 commune census.

Only primary schooling is available. The majority 95% of the population of the commune are farmers. The most important crop is rice, while other important products are peanuts, beans, cassava and sweet potatoes. Services provide employment for 5% of the population.

== Geography ==
Ampitana is situated at 5 km South of Ambohimahasoa. It is crossed by the Ankona river.
