= Milamaina =

- Location in Madagascar
- Coordinates: 20°16′S 47°24′E
- Country: Madagascar
- Region: Amoron'i Mania
- District: Fandriana
- Elevation: 1,406 m (4,613 ft)

Population (2001)
  - Total: 7,000
- Time zone: UTC3 (EAT)
- Postal code: 308

Milamaina is a rural municipality in Madagascar. It belongs to the district of Fandriana, which is a part of Amoron'i Mania Region. The population of the commune was estimated to be approximately 7,000 in 2001 commune census.

Primary and junior level secondary education are available in town. The majority 60% of the population of the commune are farmers, while an additional 33% receives their livelihood from raising livestock. The most important crop is rice, while other important products are cassava and sweet potatoes. Industry and services provide employment for 2% and 5% of the population, respectively.

== Villages ==
9 Fokontany (villages) belong to this municipality: Milamaina, Ambohipo, Ambohitrinibe, Ambohitraivo, Ambohidahy, Ankerambe Nord, Ankerambe Sud, Vohitrinimasina and Angavo

== Roads ==
This municipality is crossed by the National Road 41.
