= Tsarazaza =

- Location in Madagascar
- Coordinates: 20°8′S 47°14′E
- Country: Madagascar
- Region: Amoron'i Mania
- District: Fandriana
- Elevation: 1,648 m (5,407 ft)

Population (2001)
  - Total: 26,000
- Time zone: UTC3 (EAT)

Tsarazaza is a municipality in Madagascar. It belongs to the district of Fandriana, which is a part of Amoron'i Mania Region. The population of the commune was estimated to be approximately 26,000 in 2001 commune census.

Primary and junior level secondary education are available in town. Farming and raising livestock provides employment for 45% and 45% of the working population. The most important crop is rice, while other important products are beans, cassava and potatoes. Industry and services provide employment for 6% and 4% of the population, respectively.

== Electricity ==
Tsarazaza was connected to the electri-grid of Fandriana only in 2023.
