= Sahamadio, Fandriana =

Sahamadio
- Location in Madagascar
- Coordinates: 20°18′S 47°24′E
- Country: Madagascar
- Region: Amoron'i Mania
- District: Fandriana
- Elevation: 1,334 m (4,377 ft)

Population (2001)
  - Total: 17,000
- Time zone: UTC3 (EAT)
- Postal code: 308

Sahamadio is a rural municipality in Madagascar. It belongs to the district of Fandriana, which is a part of Amoron'i Mania Region. The population of the commune was estimated to be approximately 17,000 in 2001 commune census.

Primary and junior level secondary education are available in town. Farming and raising livestock provides employment for 49% and 45% of the working population. The most important crop is rice, while other important products are maize, cassava and sweet potatoes. Industry and services provide employment for 1% and 5% of the population, respectively.

== Geography ==
It is situated at the Mania River. This municipality is crossed by the National Road 41.
