= Barijaona Andriambelosoa =

Malagasy politician

Barijaona Andriambelosoa is a Malagasy politician. A member of the National Assembly of Madagascar, he was elected as an independent; he represents the constituency of Fandriana.
