= Fidelis Rakotonarivo =

Fidelis Rakotonarivo SJ
- Bishop of Ambositra
- Church: Catholic Church
- Diocese: Diocese of Ambositra
- Appointed: 24 June 2005
- Predecessor: Fulgence Rabemahafaly

Orders
- Ordination: 15 August 1992
- Consecration: 4 September 2005 by Fulgence Rabemahafaly

Personal details
- Born: 28 August 1956 (age 69) Ambohimahazo, Fianarantsoa Province, Colony of Madagascar and Dependencies, French Empire

Fidelis Rakotonarivo SJ (born 28 August 1956 in Ambohimahazo) is the head of the Diocese of Ambositra in Ambositra, Madagascar. He was ordained priest on 15 August 1992 by the Society of Jesus. He was appointed and confirmed as bishop during 2004.
