= Luigi Dusio =

Roman Catholic bishop

Luigi Dusio C.M.
- Bishop of Ihosy
- Church: Catholic Church
- Diocese: Diocese of Ihosy
- In office: 13 April 1967 – 2 November 1970
- Predecessor: Diocese erected
- Successor: Jean-Guy Rakodondravahatra

Orders
- Ordination: 21 December 1946
- Consecration: 22 October 1967 by Jérôme Rakotomalala

Personal details
- Born: 2 May 1920 Casorzo, Province of Alessandria, Kingdom of Italy
- Died: 2 November 1970 (aged 50)

Luigi Dusio (born 1920 in Casorzo) was an Italian clergyman and prelate for the Roman Catholic Diocese of Ihosy. He was appointed bishop in 1967. He died in 1970.

== See also ==
- Catholic Church in Madagascar
