= Philippe Ranaivomanana =

Malagasy Roman Catholic bishop (1949–2022)

His Excellency Philippe Ranaivomanana
- Bishop of Antsirabe
- Archdiocese: Antananarivo
- Appointed: 13 November 2009
- Term ended: 6 September 2022
- Predecessor: Félix Ramananarivo
- Successor: Jean Pascal Andriantsoavina
- Previous post: Bishop of Ihosy (1999–2009)

Orders
- Ordination: 16 October 1977
- Consecration: 13 May 1999 by Philibert Randriambololona

Personal details
- Born: 12 May 1949 Sarobatra, French Madagascar
- Died: 6 September 2022 (aged 73) Antsirabe, Madagascar

Philippe Ranaivomanana (12 May 1949 – 6 September 2022) was a Malagasy Roman Catholic prelate who served as the Bishop of Ihosy. He was ordained priest on 16 October 1977. He was appointed and confirmed as bishop in January 1999. He was appointed Bishop of Antsirabe on 13 November 2009.

== See also ==
- Catholic Church in Madagascar

Catholic Church titles
Preceded by Félix Ramananarivo	Bishop of Antsirabe; 2009–2022	Succeeded by Jean Pascal Andriantsoavina
Preceded by Jean-Guy Rakodondravahatra	Bishop of Ihosy; 1999–2009	Succeeded by Fulgence Razakarivony
