= Vohiposa =

- Location in Madagascar
- Coordinates: 20°59′S 47°9′E
- Country: Madagascar
- Region: Haute Matsiatra
- District: Ambohimahasoa

Area
  - Total: 111 km^{2} (43 sq mi)
- Elevation: 1,250 m (4,100 ft)

Population (2001)
  - Total: 16,000
- Time zone: UTC3 (EAT)
- Postal code: 305

Vohiposa is a rural municipality in Madagascar. It belongs to the district of Ambohimahasoa, which is a part of Haute Matsiatra Region. The population of the commune was estimated to be approximately 16,000 in 2001 commune census.

Primary and junior level secondary education are available in town. The majority 90% of the population of the commune are farmers. The most important crops are rice and peanuts, while other important agricultural products are beans and maize. Industry and services provide employment for 2% and 8% of the population, respectively.

== Geography ==
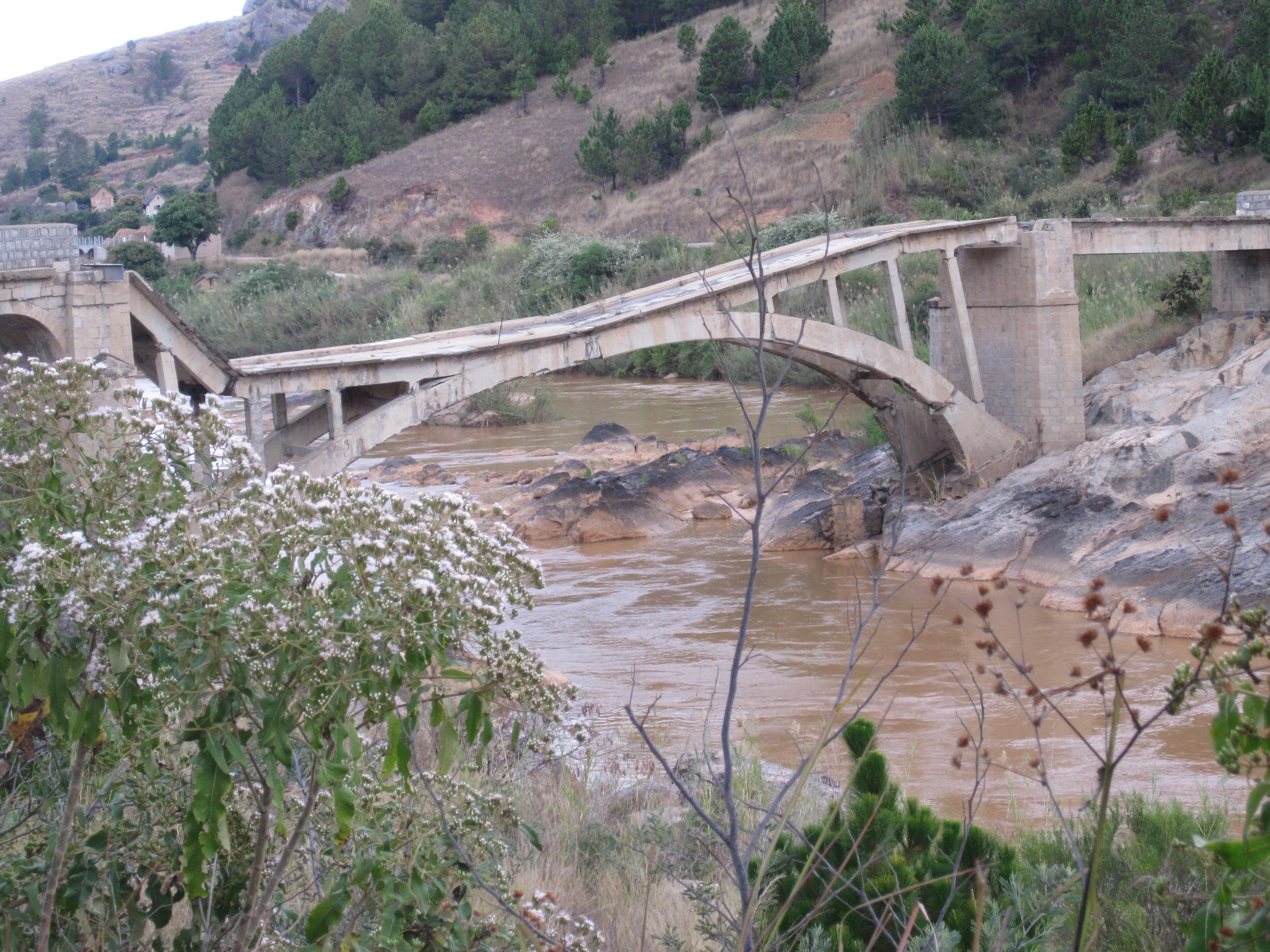
Broken bridge over the Fanindrona River

Vohiposa is situated along the National road 7 at 26 km North from Ambohimahasoa. The municipality is crossed by the Fanindrona river. In september 2017 the bridge collapsed under an overloaded truck.
