= Diocese of Ihosy =

Roman Catholic diocese in Madagascar

Coordinates: 22.3966°S 46.1161°E

Diocese of Ihosy Dioecesis Ihosiensis Diôsezin' Ihosy

Location
- Country: Madagascar
- Metropolitan: Archdiocese of Fianarantsoa
- Headquarters: Ihosy, Ihorombe, Madagascar

Statistics
- Area: 40,900 km^{2} (15,800 sq mi)
- Population: Total; Catholics: (as of 2023); 842,510; 168,870 (20.0%)
- Parishes: 3

Information
- Denomination: Catholic Church
- Sui iuris church: Latin Church
- Rite: Roman Rite
- Established: 13 April 1967; 59 years ago
- Secular priests: 37

Current leadership
- Pope: Leo XIV
- Bishop: Fulgence Razakarivony, M.S.
- Metropolitan Archbishop: Fulgence Rabemahafaly

The Diocese of Ihosy is a Roman Catholic Diocese under the Archdiocese of Fianarantsoa in Madagascar. It is based in the town of Ihosy and was erected on 13 April 1967. It performs the Latin Rite. The Diocese covers approximately 40,990 km (15,832 sq. miles). As of 2004, the diocese population was about 310,000, with 18.1% Catholic. 36 priests were in the Diocese for a ratio of 1,560 Catholics for every 1 Priest. Fulgence Razakarivony, M.S. has been the bishop of the Diocese since July 2011.

== Ordinaries ==
- Luigi Dusio, C.M. (13 Apr 1967 – 2 Nov 1970)
- Jean-Guy Rakodondravahatra, M.S. (25 Mar 1972 – 21 Sep 1996)
- Philippe Ranaivomanana (2 Jan 1999 – 13 Nov 2009), appointed Bishop of Antsirabé
- Fulgence Razakarivony, M.S. (16 Jul 2011 – Present)

== See also ==
- Catholic Church in Madagascar
