= Our Lady of La Salette Cathedral, Antsirabe =

Catholic cathedral in Madagascar

Our Lady of La Salette Cathedral
- Cathédrale Notre-Dame-de-la-Salette
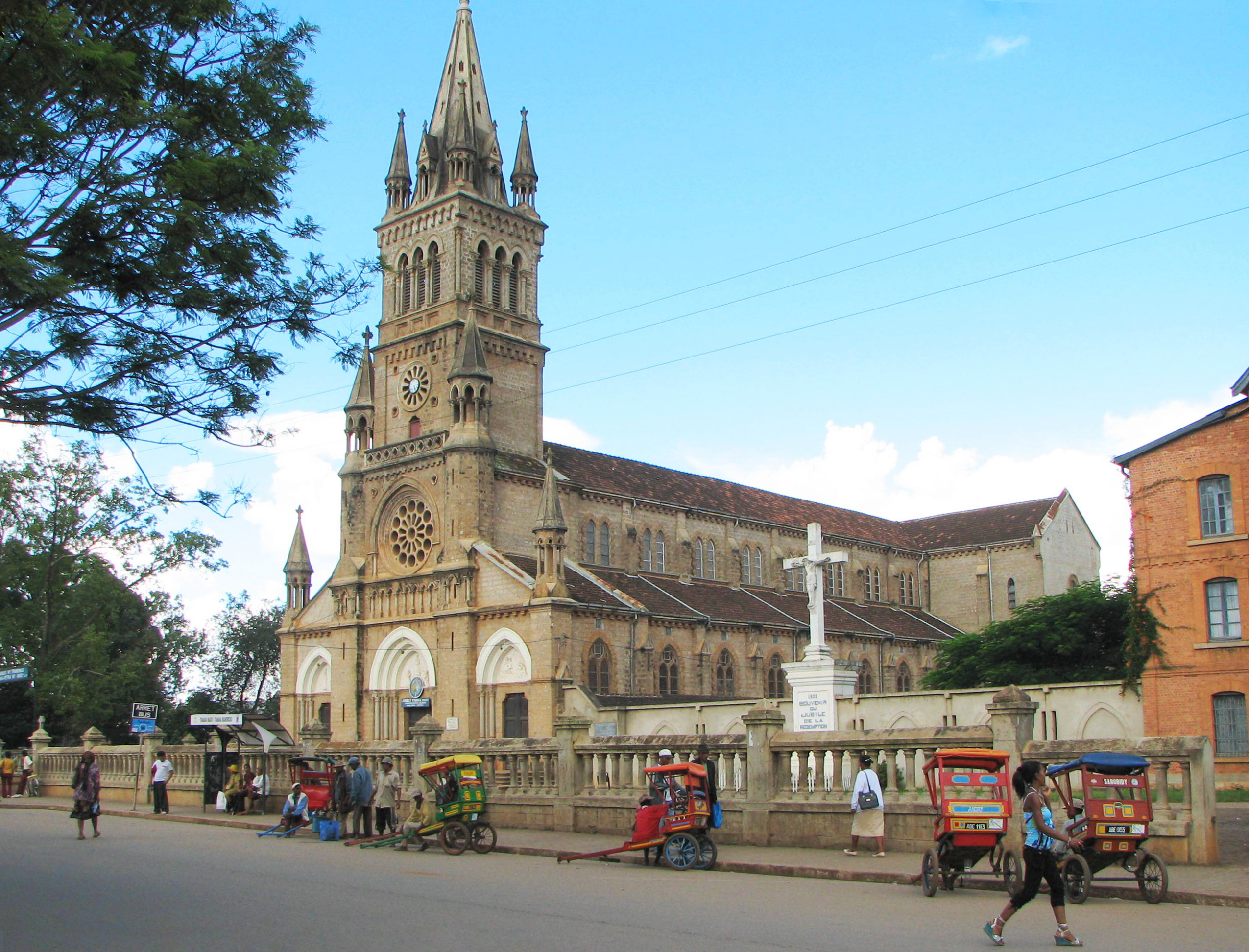
- Our Lady of La Salette Cathedral
- Our Lady of La Salette Cathedral
- 19°52′14″S 47°02′06″E
- Location: Antsirabe
- Country: Madagascar
- Denomination: Catholic Church

History
- Founded: 1908
- Dedicated: 1931
- Consecrated: 1931

Specifications
- Length: 60 metres (200 ft)
- Width: 16.77 metres (55.0 ft)
- Height: 14 metres (46 ft)

Administration
- Diocese: Antsirabe

The Our Lady of La Salette Cathedral (French: Notre-Dame-de-la-Salette) is a cathedral of the Catholic Church and is located in Antsirabe, the third-largest city in the island country of Madagascar.

== History ==
A small clay church had been established by French priest Father Dupuy prior to 1900. At the start of the century the missionaries of Our Lady of La Salette arrived in Antsirabe and in 1908 built a church that was 22 meters long, 16 meters wide, 8 meters high, with a bell tower 14 meters high.

In 1921 with the establishment of the Diocese of Antsirabe, Monsignor François Dantin ordered that a new church would be built, as the previous one was too small for the growing Catholic population in Madagascar. Dantin also ordered that this church would be the cathedral for the new diocese.

Father Joseph Michaud was the master builder and the architect of the new church. Monsignor Jean-Baptiste Raharijaona was the director of the project. The corner stone, imported from France, was laid in 1924. On 5 January 1925 work began on the new building. On 19 September 1931 the cathedral was officially dedicated, although the building was not yet completed. On 22 September 1931 the official benediction took place, conducted by Monsignor François Dantin in the presence of Bishop Charles Givelet, then Vicar Apostolic of Fianarantsoa, and Bishop Etienne Fourcadier, then Vicar Apostolic of Tananarive.

The present day church stands 60 meters long, 16.77 meters wide, 14 meters high. Its bell tower has a height of 45 meters.

In 2005 the parish celebrated its 75th anniversary.

== Today ==
Every 19 September the church acts as a pilgrimidge site in the diocese for the feast day of Our Lady of La Salette. The cathedral has mass every Sunday at 6:30 and 9 a.m.

== Gallery ==
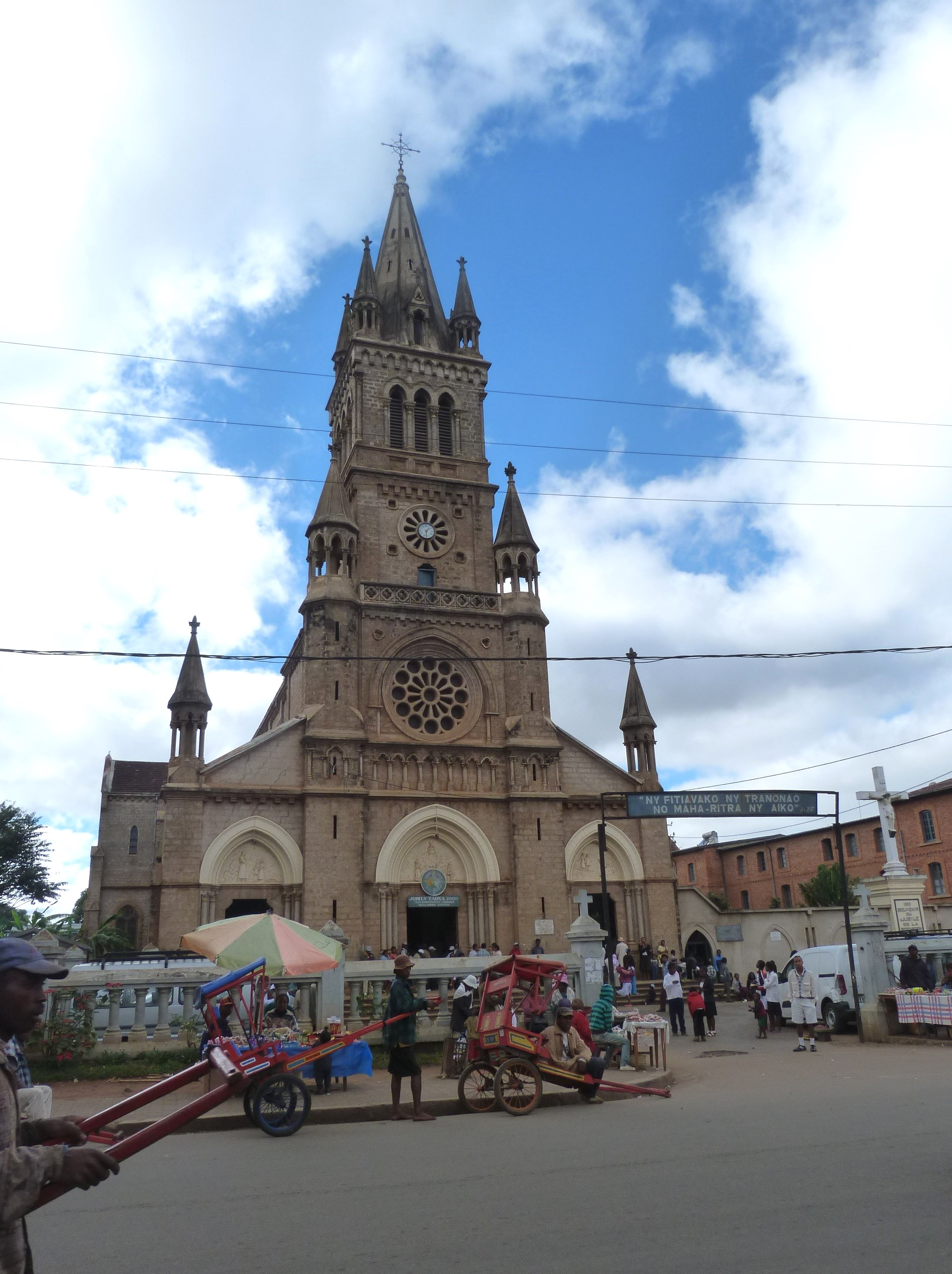
Street view of the church, looking north

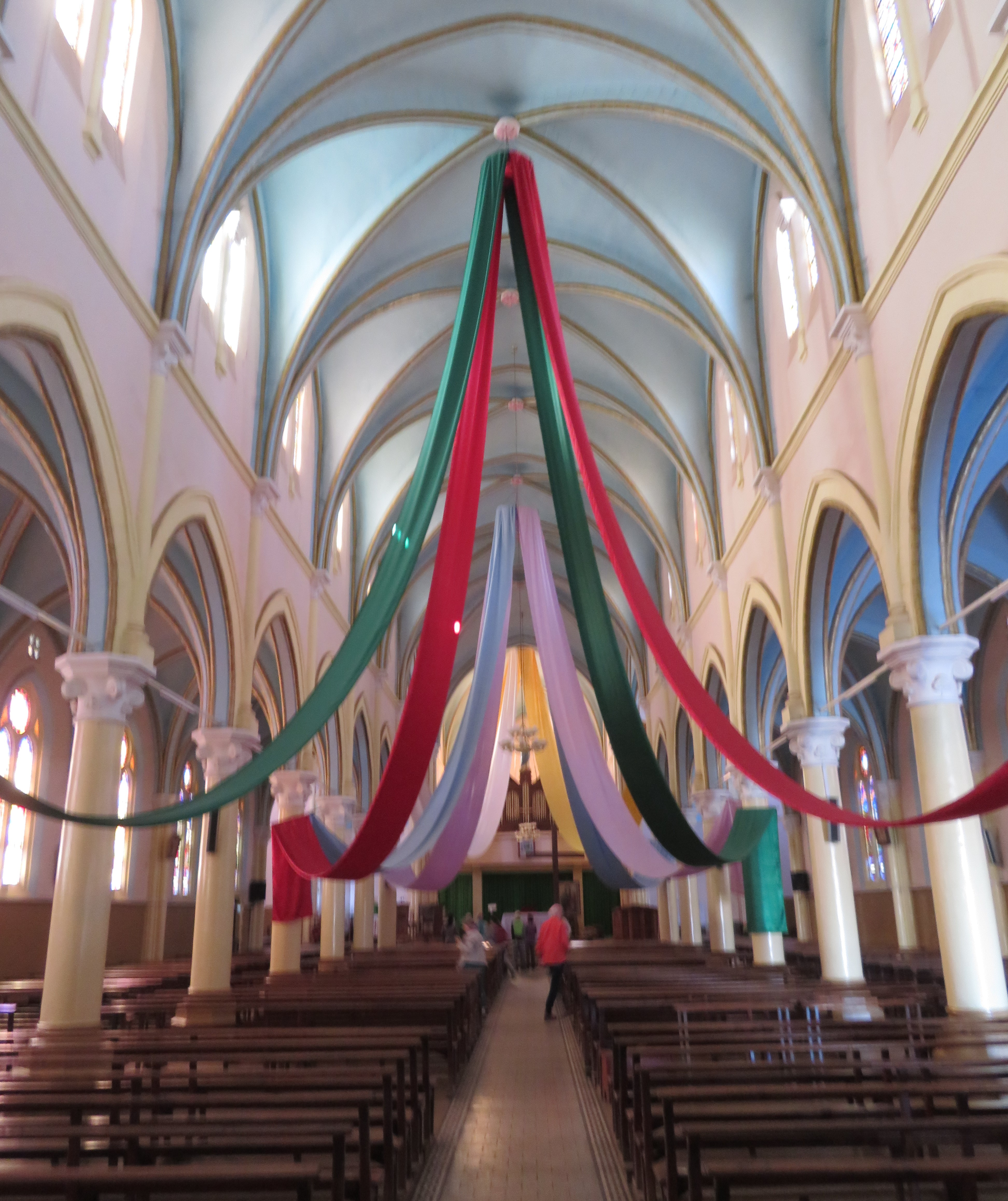
Interior of the church

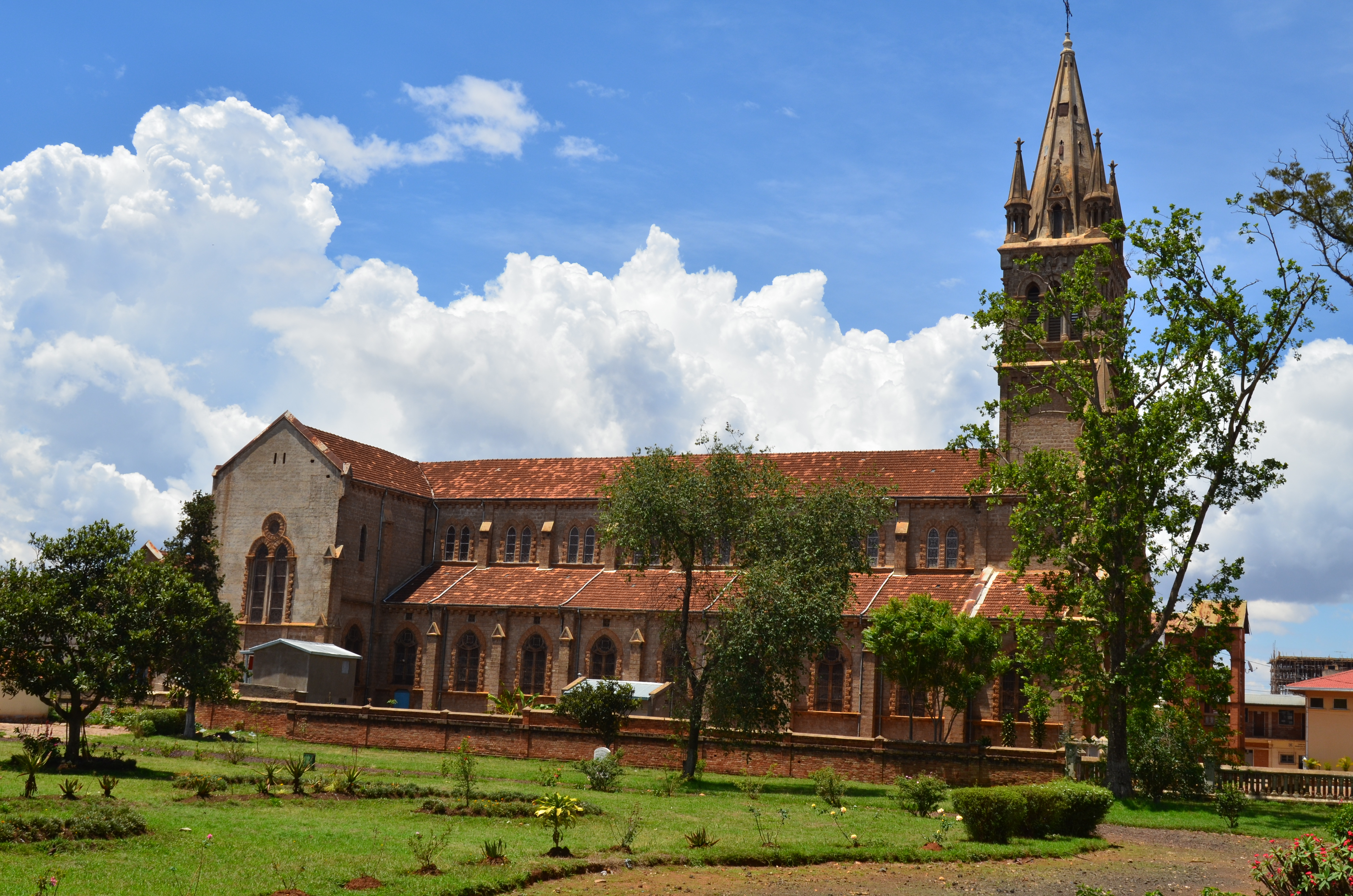
Street view of the church, looking east

== See also ==
- Roman Catholicism in Madagascar
