= Sandrandahy =

Sandrandahy Sandradahy
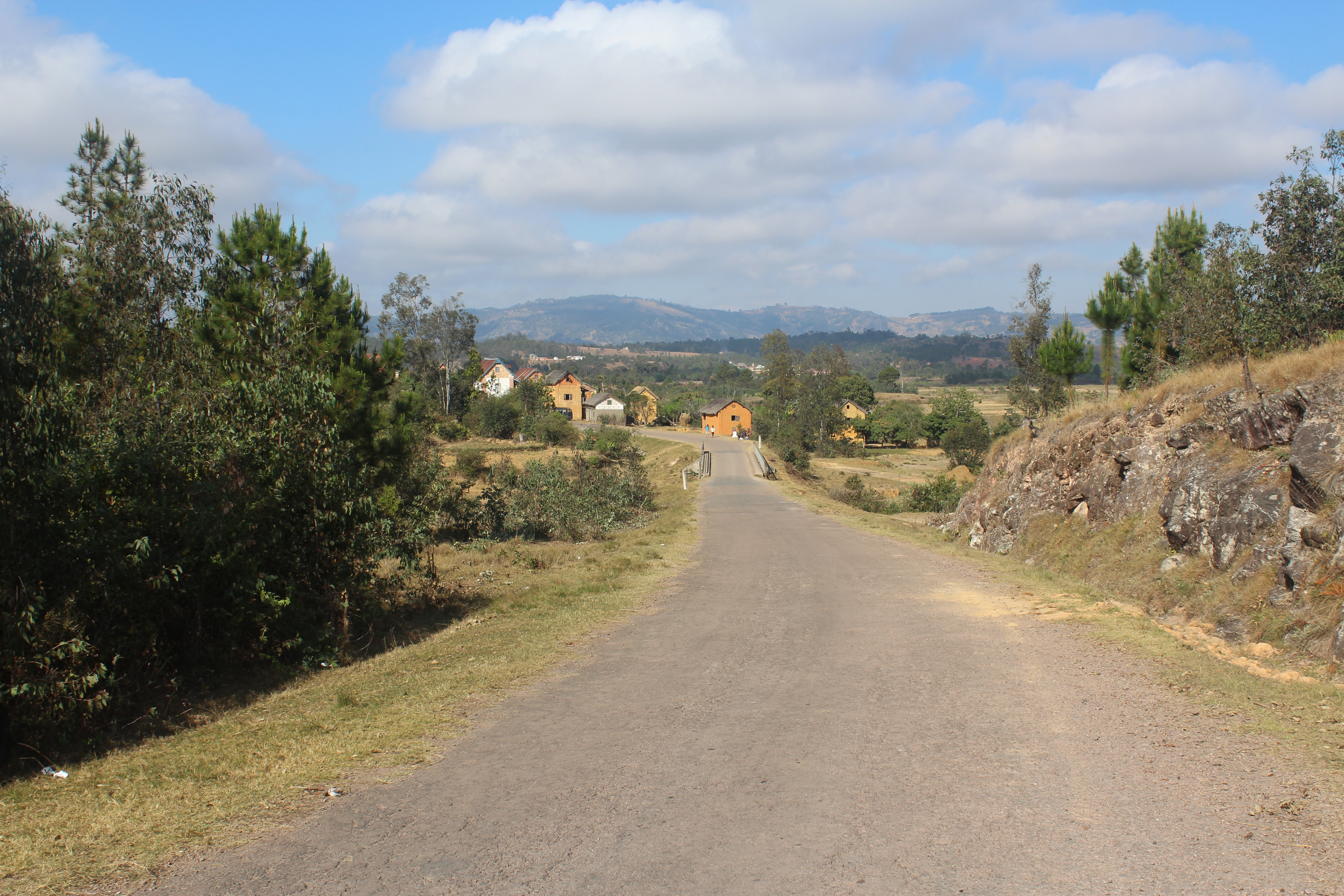
- shortly before Sandrandahy

- Location in Madagascar
- Coordinates: 20°21′S 47°18′E
- Country: Madagascar
- Region: Amoron'i Mania
- District: Fandriana
- Elevation: 1,322 m (4,337 ft)

Population (2001)
  - Total: 28,000
- Time zone: UTC3 (EAT)
- Postal code: 308

Sandrandahy is a rural municipality in Madagascar. It belongs to the district of Fandriana, which is a part of Amoron'i Mania Region. The population of the commune was estimated to be approximately 28,000 in 2001 commune census.

Primary and junior level secondary education are available in town. The majority 64% of the population of the commune are farmers, while an additional 30% receives their livelihood from raising livestock. The most important crop is rice, while other important products are maize, cassava and sweet potatoes. Industry and services provide employment for 0.5% and 5.5% of the population, respectively.

== Road ==
This municipality is situated on the National road 41 at distance of 21 km from its interjunction with the National road 7.

== Tapia forest ==
The Tapia forest of Sandrandahy supplies the town with fruits, champignons and wild silk.
