= Fiadanana, Nosy Varika =

Fiadanana
- Location in Madagascar
- Coordinates: 20°26′S 48°23′E
- Country: Madagascar
- Region: Vatovavy
- District: Nosy Varika
- Elevation: 122 m (400 ft)

Population (2001)
  - Total: 21,000
- Time zone: UTC3 (EAT)

For other municipalities with the same name, see: Fiadanana (disambiguation)

Fiadanana is a town and commune in Madagascar. It belongs to the district of Nosy Varika, which is a part of Vatovavy. The population of the commune was estimated to be approximately 21,000 in 2001 commune census.

Only primary schooling is available. The majority 95% of the population of the commune are farmers. The most important crop is coffee, while other important products are pepper and rice. Services provide employment for 5% of the population.
