= Fiadanana, Fandriana =

Fiadanana
- Location in Madagascar
- Coordinates: 20°20′S 47°26′E
- Country: Madagascar
- Region: Amoron'i Mania
- District: Fandriana
- Elevation: 1,427 m (4,682 ft)

Population (2001)
  - Total: 14,000
- Time zone: UTC3 (EAT)

For other municipalities with the same name, see: Fiadanana (disambiguation)

Fiadanana is a town and commune in Madagascar. It belongs to the district of Fandriana, which is a part of Amoron'i Mania Region. The population of the commune was estimated to be approximately 14,000 in 2001 commune census.

Only primary schooling is available. The majority 95% of the population of the commune are farmers. The most important crop is rice, while other important products are maize, cassava and sweet potatoes. Services provide employment for 5% of the population.
