= Ambatosoa, Ambohimahasoa =

Ambatosoa
- Location in Madagascar
- Coordinates: 21°0′S 47°17′E
- Country: Madagascar
- Region: Haute Matsiatra
- District: Ambohimahasoa
- Elevation: 1,391 m (4,564 ft)

Population (2001)
  - Total: 12,000
- Time zone: UTC3 (EAT)

Ambatosoa is a town and commune in Madagascar. It belongs to the district of Ambohimahasoa, which is a part of Haute Matsiatra Region. The population of the commune was estimated to be approximately 12,000 in 2001 commune census.

Primary and junior level secondary education are available in town. The majority 99% of the population of the commune are farmers. The most important crop is rice, while other important products are beans, maize, cassava, and sweet potatoes. Services provide employment for 1% of the population.
