= Mahazoarivo, Fandriana =

Mahazoarivo
- Location in Madagascar
- Coordinates: 20°23′S 47°26′E
- Country: Madagascar
- Region: Amoron'i Mania
- District: Fandriana

Area
  - Total: 255 km^{2} (98 sq mi)
- Elevation: 1,443 m (4,734 ft)

Population (2019)Census
  - Total: 11,869
- Time zone: UTC3 (EAT)
- Postal code: 308

Mahazoarivo is a town and commune in Madagascar. It belongs to the district of Fandriana, which is a part of Amoron'i Mania Region. The population of the commune was 11,869 in 2019, distributed over 21 Fokontany (villages).

Primary and junior level secondary education are available in town. The majority 98% of the population of the commune are farmers, while an additional 0.5% receives their livelihood from raising livestock. The most important crops are rice and beans, while other important agricultural products are cassava and sweet potatoes. Services provide employment for 1.5% of the population.
