= Fiadanana, Ambohidratrimo =

Fiadanana
- Location in Madagascar
- Country: Madagascar
- Region: Analamanga
- District: Ambohidratrimo (district)

Area
  - Total: 15.07 km^{2} (5.82 sq mi)
- Elevation: 1,300 m (4,300 ft)

Population (2019)Census
  - Total: 7,223
- Time zone: UTC3 (EAT)
- Postal code: 105

For other municipalities with the same name, see: Fiadanana (disambiguation)

Fiadanana is a rural municipality in Madagascar. It belongs to the district of Ambohidratrimo (district), which is a part of Analamanga Region. The population of the commune was 7,223 in 2019.

== Rivers ==
The Sisaony is the only river that crosses the municipality.

== Ethnics ==
The village is inhabited by the Merina.

== Religion ==
71% of the population are Protestants, 25% are Catholic.
