= Fiadanana =

Fiadanana may refer to several municipalities in Madagascar:

- Fiadanana, Ambohidratrimo, a municipality in Ambohidratrimo (district), Analamanga
- Fiadanana, Ambohimahasoa, a municipality in Haute Matsiatra
- Fiadanana, Ankazobe, a municipality in Ankazobe (district), Analamanga
- Fiadanana, Fandriana, a municipality in Amoron'i Mania
- Fiadanana, Nosy Varika, a municipality in Vatovavy
