= José Alfredo Caires de Nobrega =

José Alfredo Caires de Nobrega S.C.I.
- Bishop of Mananjary
- Church: Catholic Church
- Diocese: Diocese of Mananjary
- Appointed: 30 October 2000
- Predecessor: François Xavier Tabao Manjarimanana
- Previous post: Apostolic Administrator of Farafangana (2014-2018)

Orders
- Ordination: 28 December 1980
- Consecration: 18 March 2001 by Philibert Randriambololona

Personal details
- Born: 12 April 1951 (age 75) Caniço, Madeira, Portugal

Bishop José Alfredo Caires de Nobrega (born 12 April 1951 in Caniço (Santa Cruz)) is the bishop of the Diocese of Mananjary in Mananjary, Madagascar. He was ordained priest on 28 December 1980 by the Priests of the Sacred Heart congregation. He was appointed and confirmed as bishop in October 2000.
