= Fiadanana, Ankazobe =

Fiadanana (Ankazobe)
- Location in Madagascar
- Coordinates: 18°13′S 46°53′E
- Country: Madagascar
- Region: Analamanga
- District: Ankazobe

Area
  - Total: 277 km^{2} (107 sq mi)
- Elevation: 1,005 m (3,297 ft)

Population
  - Total: 14,784
- Time zone: UTC3 (EAT)
- postal code: 108

For other municipalities with the same name, see Fiadanana (disambiguation)

Fiadanana (Ankazobe) is a town in Analamanga Region, in the Central Highlands of Madagascar, in the district of Ankazobe. It is located north-west from the capital of Antananarivo. It has a population of 14,784 inhabitants in 2018.

== Rivers ==
The commune is at the border of the Ikopa River.
