= Ankerana =

- Location in Madagascar
- Coordinates: 21°2′S 47°7′E
- Country: Madagascar
- Region: Haute Matsiatra
- District: Ambohimahasoa
- Elevation: 1,292 m (4,239 ft)

Population (2001)
  - Total: 10,000
- Time zone: UTC3 (EAT)

Ankerana is a town and commune in Madagascar. It belongs to the district of Ambohimahasoa, which is a part of Haute Matsiatra Region. The population of the commune was estimated to be approximately 10,000 in 2001 commune census.

Only primary schooling is available. The majority 90% of the population of the commune are farmers, while an additional 5% receives their livelihood from raising livestock. The most important crop is rice, while other important products are peanuts, cassava and potatoes. Services provide employment for 5% of the population.
