= Befeta =

- Location in Madagascar
- Coordinates: 21°14′S 47°3′E
- Country: Madagascar
- Region: Haute Matsiatra
- District: Ambohimahasoa
- Elevation: 1,082 m (3,550 ft)

Population (2001)
  - Total: 13,000
- Time zone: UTC3 (EAT)

Befeta is a town and commune in Madagascar. It belongs to the district of Ambohimahasoa, which is a part of Haute Matsiatra Region. The population of the commune was estimated to be approximately 13,000 in 2001 commune census.

Primary and junior level secondary education are available in town. The majority 80% of the population of the commune are farmers. The most important crops are rice and beans, while other important agricultural products are maize and grapes. Industry and services provide employment for 5% and 15% of the population, respectively.
