= Camp Robin =

- Location in Madagascar
- Coordinates: 20°55′S 47°8′E
- Country: Madagascar
- Region: Haute Matsiatra
- District: Ambohimahasoa
- Elevation: 1,371 m (4,498 ft)

Population (2018)
  - Total: 12,803
- Time zone: UTC3 (EAT)
- Postal code: 305

Camp Robin is a rural commune in the Central Highlands of Madagascar. It belongs to the district of Ambohimahasoa, which is a part of Haute Matsiatra Region. The population of the commune was estimated to be 12803 in 2018.

Only primary schooling is available. The majority 98% of the population of the commune are farmers. The most important crops are rice and potatoes, while other important agricultural products are peanuts and cassava. Services provide employment for 2% of the population.

== Roads ==
Camp Robin is situated on the National road 7, north of Fianarantsoa.
