= Kingdom of Fisakana =

Betsileo kingdom in Madagascar

Kingdom of Fisakana Fanjakan'I Fisakana (Malagasy)
- c. 1625–1808
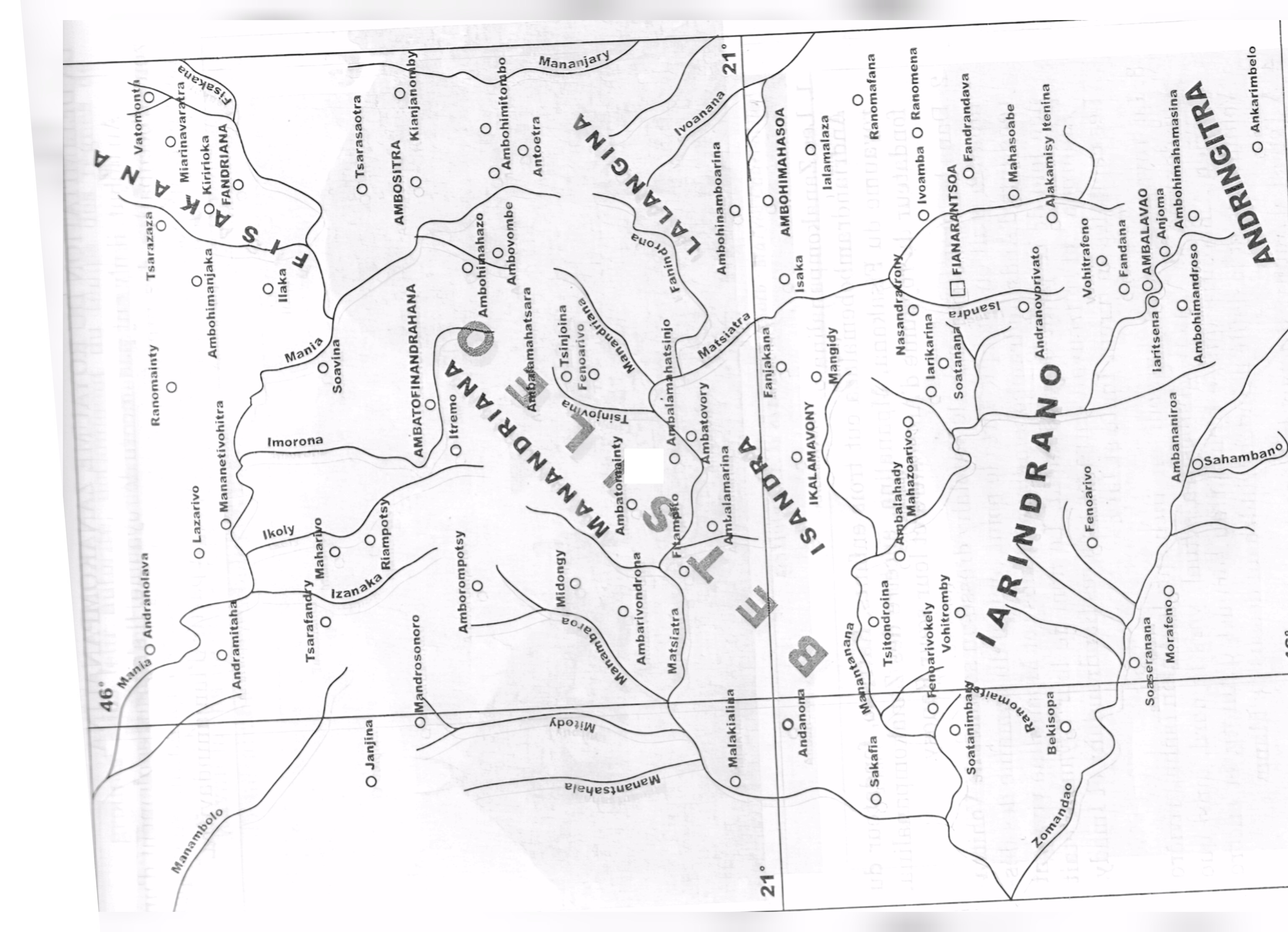
- Map of Betsileo kingdoms; Fisakana is in the north (left) on the map.
- Common languages: Betsileo
- Religion: Traditional beliefs
- Government: Absolute monarchy
- Historical era: Pre-colonial
  - Foundation: c. 1625
  - Fall of Kirioka: 1808
Succeeded by
Merina kingdom
- Today part of: Madagascar

Fisakana is a Betsileo kingdom in central Madagascar. It was established by Ratrimo , the son of Andriandavaloha, who is thought to have come from Matitana.

== History ==
Fisakana was founded by Ratrimo upon merging five small kingdoms:

- Kingdom of Tsiakarandambo
- Kingdom of Miarikanjaka
- Kingdom of Matahotrony
- Kingdom of Ianjanindavitra
- Kingdom of Ambohipoloalina

The Fikasana kingdom ended when Andrianampoinimerina army captured its capital Kirioka in early 1800s. It was incorporated into the historical Vakinankaratra province of Imerina.

== List of rulers ==
- Ratrimo(1625–1650)
- Rahendry(1650–1655)
- Rivoekembahoaka I(1655–1775)
- Andrianandrianina(1775–1796)
- Rivoekembahoaka II (1796–1808)

== Location ==
Fisakana is located mostly in the district of Fandriana.
