= François Xavier Tabao Manjarimanana =

Catholic bishop

François Xavier Tabao Manjarimanana S.J.
- Bishop of Mananjary
- Church: Catholic Church
- Diocese: Diocese of Mananjary
- In office: 20 November 1975 – 24 May 1999
- Predecessor: Robert Lucien Chapuis
- Successor: José Alfredo Caires de Nobrega

Orders
- Ordination: 29 June 1960
- Consecration: 21 March 1976 by Michele Cecchini

Personal details
- Born: 3 December 1927 Ankatafana, Colony of Madagascar and Dependencies, French Empire
- Died: 24 May 1999 (aged 71)

François Xavier Tabao Manjarimanana (born 1927 in Ankatafana) was a Malagasy clergyman and prelate for the Roman Catholic Diocese of Mananjary. He was appointed bishop in 1975. He died in 1999.
