= Betsimisotra =

- Location in Madagascar
- Coordinates: 20°15′S 47°37′E
- Country: Madagascar
- Region: Amoron'i Mania
- District: Fandriana
- Elevation: 1,486 m (4,875 ft)

Population (2001)
  - Total: 8,000
- Time zone: UTC3 (EAT)

Betsimisotra is a town and commune in Madagascar. It belongs to the district of Fandriana, which is a part of Amoron'i Mania Region. The population of the commune was estimated to be approximately 8,000 in 2001 commune census.

Primary and junior level secondary education are available in the town. 98.5% of the population of the commune are farmers. The most important crop is rice, while other important products are beans, cassava and sweet potatoes. Services provide employment for 1.5% of the population.
