= Sahatona =

- Location in Madagascar
- Coordinates: 20°58′S 47°6′E
- Country: Madagascar
- Region: Haute Matsiatra
- District: Ambohimahasoa
- Elevation: 1,260 m (4,130 ft)

Population (2001)
  - Total: 10,000
- Time zone: UTC3 (EAT)

Sahatona is a town and commune in Madagascar. It belongs to the district of Ambohimahasoa, which is a part of Haute Matsiatra Region. The population of the commune was estimated to be approximately 10,000 in 2001 commune census.

Primary and junior level secondary education are available in town. The majority 90% of the population of the commune are farmers, while an additional 5% receives their livelihood from raising livestock. The most important crops are rice and beans, while other important agricultural products are cassava, sweet potatoes and potatoes. Services provide employment for 5% of the population.
