= Manandroy =

- Location in Madagascar
- Coordinates: 21°8′S 47°16′E
- Country: Madagascar
- Region: Haute Matsiatra
- District: Ambohimahasoa
- Elevation: 1,218 m (3,996 ft)

Population (2001)
  - Total: 11,000
- Time zone: UTC3 (EAT)
- Postal code: 305

Manandroy is a rural municipality in Madagascar. It belongs to the district of Ambohimahasoa, which is a part of Haute Matsiatra Region. The population of the commune was estimated to be approximately 11,000 in 2001 commune census.

Primary and junior level secondary education are available in town. The majority 97% of the population of the commune are farmers. The most important crops are rice and beans, while other important agricultural products are peanuts, cassava, sweet potatoes and bambara groundnut. Services provide employment for 3% of the population.

== Roads ==
Manandroy is situated at the National road 25.
