= Ambohinamboarina =

- Location in Madagascar
- Coordinates: 21°2′S 47°3′E
- Country: Madagascar
- Region: Haute Matsiatra
- District: Ambohimahasoa
- Elevation: 1,130 m (3,710 ft)

Population (2001)
  - Total: 12,000
- Time zone: UTC3 (EAT)

Ambohinamboarina is a town and commune in Madagascar. It belongs to the district of Ambohimahasoa, which is a part of Haute Matsiatra Region. The population of the commune was estimated to be approximately 12,000 in 2001 commune census.

Only primary schooling is available. The majority 95% of the population of the commune are farmers. The most important crop is rice, while other important products are peanuts and sugarcane. Services provide employment for 5% of the population.
