= Sahave =

- Location in Madagascar
- Coordinates: 21°4′S 47°7′E
- Country: Madagascar
- Region: Haute Matsiatra
- District: Ambohimahasoa
- Elevation: 1,188 m (3,898 ft)

Population (2001)
  - Total: 15,000
- Time zone: UTC3 (EAT)

Sahave is a town and commune in Madagascar. It belongs to the district of Ambohimahasoa, which is a part of Haute Matsiatra Region. The population of the commune was estimated to be approximately 15,000 in 2001 commune census.

Primary and junior level secondary education are available in town. The majority 95% of the population of the commune are farmers. The most important crops are rice and beans, while other important agricultural products are peanuts, maize and cassava. Services provide employment for 5% of the population.
