= Robert Lucien Chapuis =

French catholic bishop

Robert Lucien Chapuis MEP
- Bishop of Mananjary
- Church: Catholic Church
- Diocese: Diocese of Mananjary
- In office: 9 April 1968 – 29 December 1973
- Predecessor: Diocese erected
- Successor: François Xavier Tabao Manjarimanana

Orders
- Ordination: 22 December 1962 by Henri Pinault
- Consecration: 23 June 1968 by Gilbert Ramanantoanina

Personal details
- Born: 4 April 1935 Vescemont, Territoire de Belfort, France
- Died: 8 March 2009 (aged 73) Caen, Normandy, France

Robert Lucien Chapuis (4 April 1935 in Vescemont – 8 March 2009) was a French clergyman and prelate for the Roman Catholic Diocese of Mananjary. He was appointed bishop in 1968. He resigned in 1973, and died in 2009.
