= Imito =

- Location in Madagascar
- Coordinates: 20°25′S 47°19′E
- Country: Madagascar
- Region: Amoron'i Mania
- District: Fandriana
- Elevation: 1,372 m (4,501 ft)

Population (2001)
  - Total: 28,000
- Time zone: UTC3 (EAT)

Imito is a town and commune in Madagascar. It belongs to the district of Fandriana, which is a part of the Amoron'i Mania region. The population of the commune was estimated to be approximately 28,000 in the 2001 commune census.

Primary and junior level secondary education are available in town. The majority 99% of the population of the commune are farmers. The most important crop is rice, while other important products are beans, cassava and sweet potatoes. Services provide employment for 1% of the population.
