= Alakamisy Ambohimahazo =

Coordinates: 20°24′S 47°21′E

- Interactive map of Alakamisy Ambohimahazo
- Country: Madagascar
- Region: Amoron'i Mania
- District: Fandriana

Population (2001)
  - Total: 9,000
- Time zone: UTC3 (EAT)

Alakamisy Ambohimahazo is a town and commune in Madagascar. It belongs to the district of Fandriana, which is a part of Amoron'i Mania Region. The population of the commune was estimated to be approximately 9,000 in 2001 commune census.

Primary and junior level secondary education are available in town. The majority 94% of the population of the commune are farmers, while an additional 1% receives their livelihood from raising livestock. The most important crop is rice, while other important products are cassava, sweet potatoes and tobacco. Services provide employment for 5% of the population.
