= Fiadanana, Ambohimahasoa =

Fiadanana
- Location in Madagascar
- Coordinates: 20°52′S 47°11′E
- Country: Madagascar
- Region: Haute Matsiatra
- District: Ambohimahasoa
- Elevation: 1,414 m (4,639 ft)

Population (2001)
  - Total: 16,000
- Time zone: UTC3 (EAT)

For other municipalities with the same name, see: Fiadanana (disambiguation)

Fiadanana is a town and commune in Madagascar. It belongs to the district of Ambohimahasoa, which is a part of the Haute Matsiatra Region. The population of the commune was estimated to be approximately 16,000 in 2001 commune census.

Primary and junior level secondary education are available in the town. 99% of the population of the commune is made of farmers. The most important crops are rice and potatoes, while other important agricultural products are fruits and beans. Services provide employment for 1% of the population.
