= Ambalakindresy =

- Location in Madagascar
- Coordinates: 21°10′S 47°20′E
- Country: Madagascar
- Region: Haute Matsiatra
- District: Ambohimahasoa
- Elevation: 1,195 m (3,921 ft)

Population (2001)
  - Total: 13,000
- Time zone: UTC3 (EAT)

Ambalakindresy is a town and commune in Madagascar. It belongs to the district of Ambohimahasoa, which is a part of Haute Matsiatra Region. The population of the commune was estimated to be approximately 13,000 in 2001 commune census.

Only primary schooling is available. The majority 98% of the population of the commune are farmers. The most important crops are rice and beans, while other important agricultural products are cassava, sweet potatoes and potatoes. Services provide employment for 2% of the population.
