= Ambohimahasoa District =

Ambohimahasoa
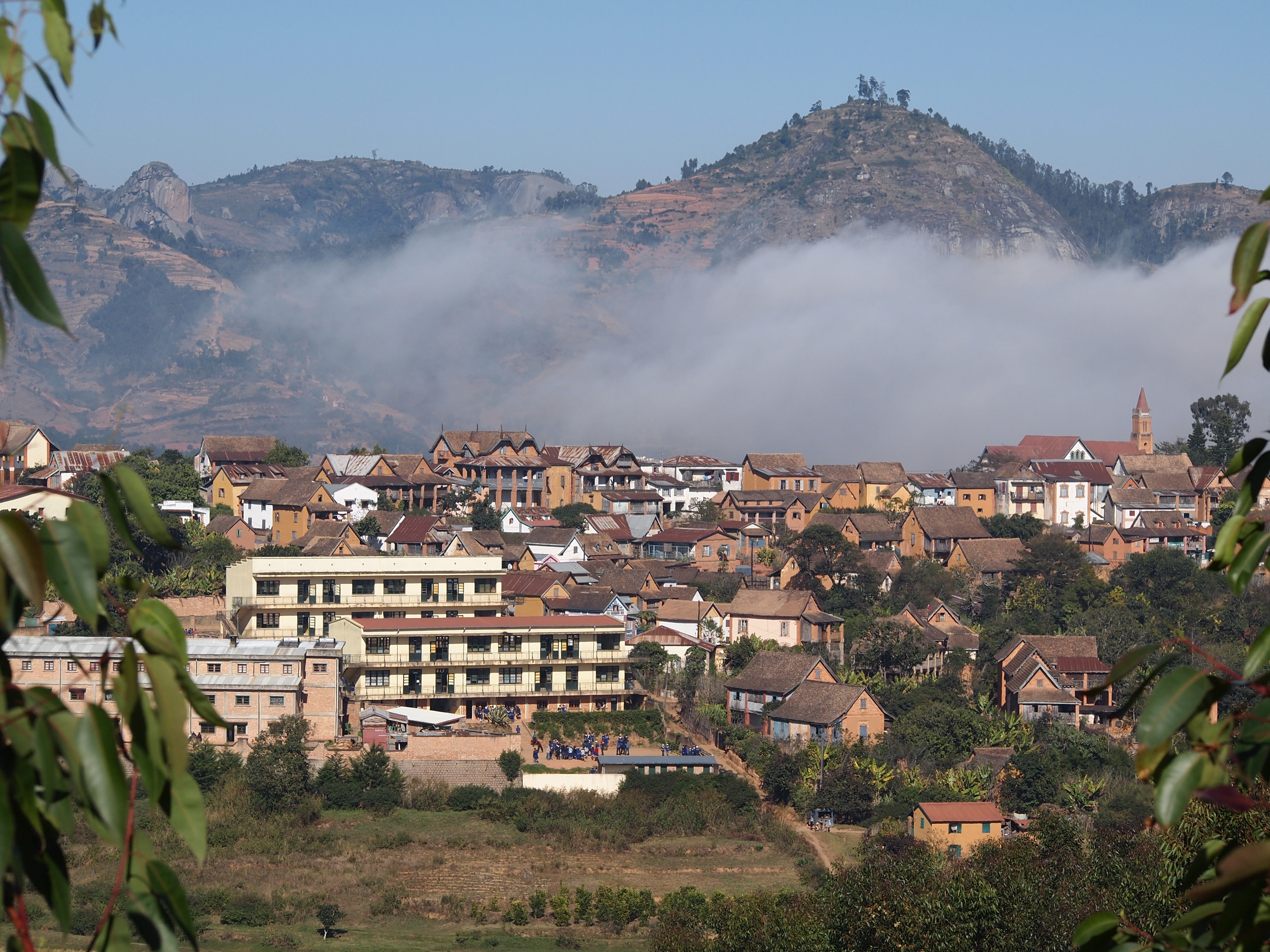
- Ambohimahasoa

- Location in Madagascar
- Country: Madagascar
- Region: Haute Matsiatra
- District: Ambohimahasoa District

Area
  - Total: 1,962 km^{2} (758 sq mi)

Population (2018)
  - Total: 271,233
- Census
- Postal code: 305

Ambohimahasoa District is a district in central Madagascar. It is part of Haute Matsiatra Region. Its capital is Ambohimahasoa.

== Communes ==
The district is further divided into 17 communes:

- Ambalakindresy
- Ambatosoa
- Ambohimahasoa
- Ambohinamboarina
- Ampitana
- Ankafina-Tsarafidy
- Ankerana
- Befeta
- Camp Robin
- Fiadanana
- Isaka
- Ikalalao
- Manandroy
- Morafeno
- Sahatona
- Sahave
- Vohiposa

== Roads ==
The district is crossed by two national roads: the National road 7 and the National road 25.

== Protected areas ==
- Part of Ambositra-Vondrozo Forest Corridor, a protected harmonious landscape
- Part of Ranomafana National Park.
