= Ankafina-Tsarafidy =

- Location in Madagascar
- Coordinates: 21°12′S 47°15′E
- Country: Madagascar
- Region: Haute Matsiatra
- District: Ambohimahasoa
- Elevation: 1,258 m (4,127 ft)

Population (2001)
  - Total: 12,000
- Time zone: UTC3 (EAT)

Ankafina-Tsarafidy is a rural commune in the Central Highlands of Madagascar. It belongs to the district of Ambohimahasoa, which is a part of Haute Matsiatra Region. The population of the commune was estimated to be approximately 12,000 in the 2001 commune census.

Primary and junior level secondary education are available in town. The majority of the population of the commune are farmers (99%). The most important crop is rice, while other important products are beans, maize and sweet potatoes. Services provide employment for 0.01% of the population.
