= Diocese of Ambositra =

Roman Catholic diocese in Madagascar

Coordinates: 20.5314°S 47.2451°E

Diocese of Ambositra Dioecesis Ambositrensis
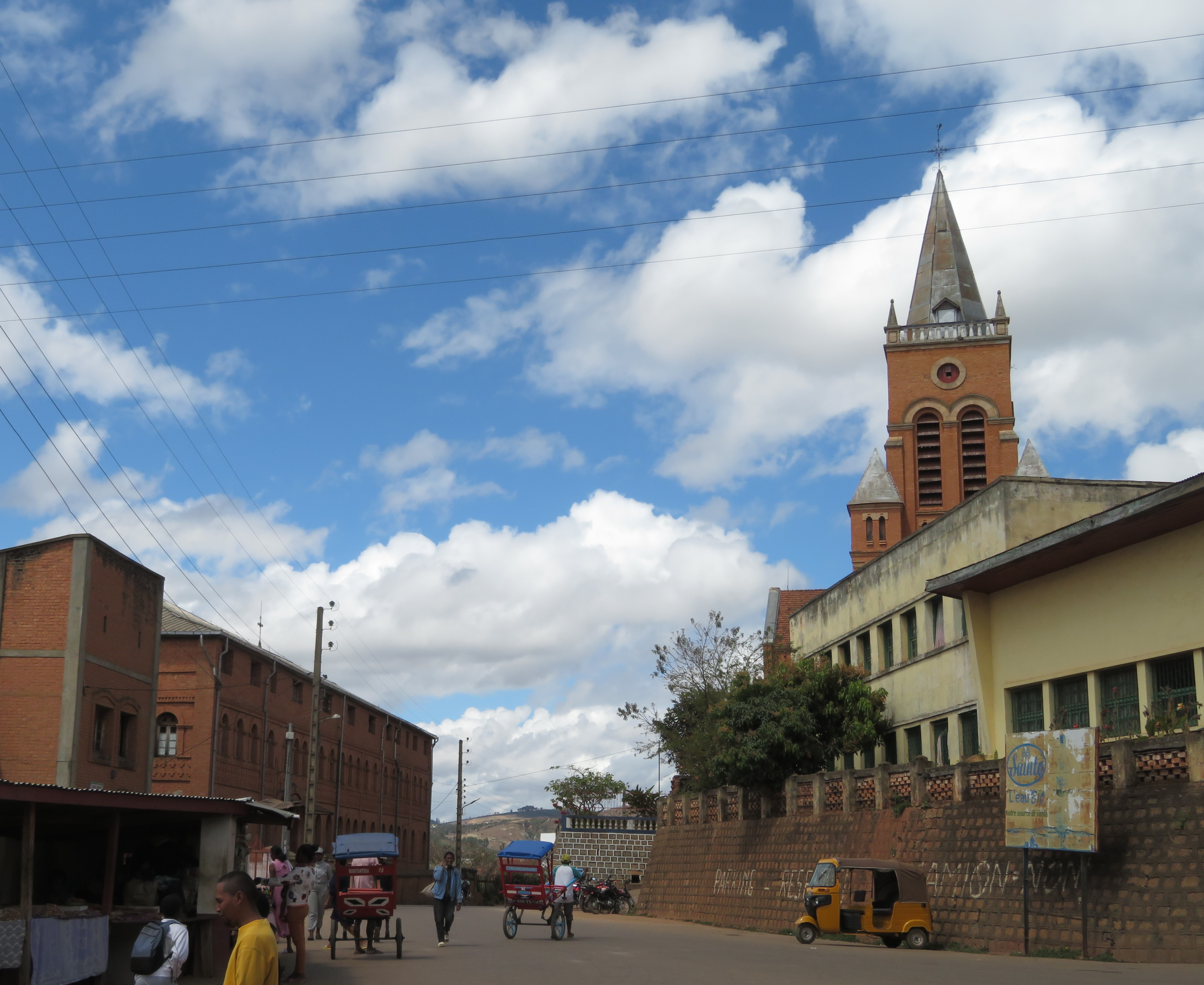

Location
- Country: Madagascar
- Ecclesiastical province: Fianarantsoa

Statistics
- Area: 29,400 km^{2} (11,400 sq mi)
- Population: Total; Catholics: (as of 2004); 1,680,240; 334,828 (48.1%)
- Parishes: 18

Information
- Denomination: Roman Catholic
- Rite: Roman rite
- Established: 3 June 1999
- Cathedral: Cathedral of the Immaculate Heart of Mary

Current leadership
- Pope: Leo XIV
- Bishop: Fidelis Rakotonarivo SJ

The Diocese of Ambositra is a Roman Catholic Diocese under the Archdiocese of Fianarantsoa in Madagascar. It is based in the town of Ambositra and was erected on 3 June 1999. It performs the Latin Rite. The Diocese covers approximately 24,000 km (15,000 mi). As of 2004, the diocese population was about 334,828, with 48.1% Catholic. 57 priests were in the Diocese as of 2004 for a ratio of 5,874 Catholics for every 1 priest. Fidelis Rakotonarivo, SJ has been the Bishop of the Diocese since June 2005.

== Bishops ==
- Fulgence Rabemahafaly (3 June 1999 - 1 October 2002), appointed Archbishop of Fianarantsoa
- Fidelis Rakotonarivo, S.J. (24 Jun 2005 -)

=== Other priest of this diocese who became bishop ===
- Marcellin Randriamamonjy, appointed Bishop of Fenoarivo Atsinanana in 2009

== See also ==
- Catholic Church in Madagascar
