= Ikalalao =

- Location in Madagascar
- Coordinates: 21°11′S 47°6′E
- Country: Madagascar
- Region: Haute Matsiatra
- District: Ambohimahasoa

Area
  - Total: 105.10 km^{2} (40.58 sq mi)
- Elevation: 1,229 m (4,032 ft)

Population (2018)
  - Total: 14.950
- Time zone: UTC3 (EAT)
- Postal code: 305

Ikalalao is a rural municipality in Madagascar. It belongs to the district of Ambohimahasoa, which is a part of Haute Matsiatra Region. The population of the commune was estimated to be 14.950 in 2018.

It is situated at 83 km north of Fianarantsoa, following the National road 7. The municipality is furthermore divided in 12 Fokontany (villages) : Ambalavato, Ambohibe, Ambohitsaony, Andohamango I, Andohamango II, Ankifafamavo, Antetindravita, Iavimanangana, Imango I, Ikalalao, Malaza and Vohibato.

Geranium oils are won in this municipality.

Primary and junior level secondary education are available in town. The majority 99% of the population of the commune are farmers. The most important crops are rice and beans, while other important agricultural products are peanuts and cassava. Services provide employment for 1% of the population.
