= Diocese of Mananjary =

Roman Catholic diocese in Madagascar

Coordinates: 21.2386°S 48.3466°E

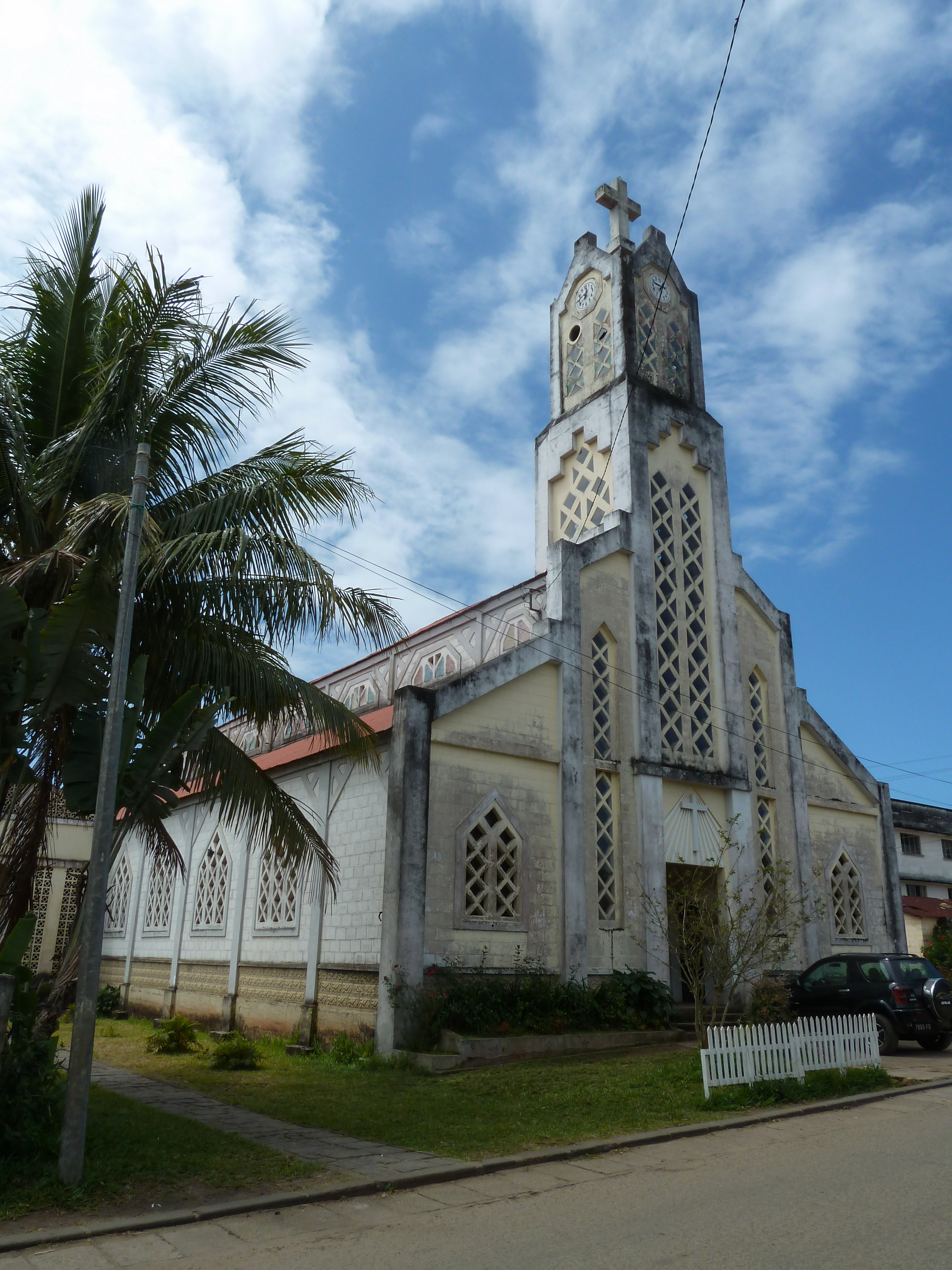
- St. Augustine Cathedral in Mananjary

Location
- Country: Madagascar
- Ecclesiastical province: Fianarantsoa

Statistics
- Area: 14,270 km^{2} (5,510 sq mi)
- Population: Total; Catholics: (as of 2023); 1,991,721; 195,237 (9.8%)
- Parishes: 18

Information
- Denomination: Roman Catholic
- Rite: Roman rite
- Established: 9 April 1968
- Cathedral: St. Augustine Cathedral

Current leadership
- Pope: Leo XIV
- Bishop: José Alfredo Caires de Nobrega, S.C.I.

The Diocese of Mananjary is a Roman Catholic Latin Rite diocese under the Archdiocese of Fianarantsoa in Madagascar. It is based in the town of Mananjary and was erected on 9 April 1968. The Diocese covers approximately 14,270 km (5,511 sq. miles). As of 2004, the diocese population was about 700,000 with 14.8% Catholic. 35 priests were in the Diocese for a ratio of 2,962 Catholics for every 1 Priest. José Alfredo Caires de Nobrega, SCI has been the bishop of the Diocese since October 2000.

== Ordinaries ==
- Robert Lucien Chapuis, M.E.P. (9 Apr 1968 - 29 Dec 1973)
- François Xavier Tabao Manjarimanana, S.J. (20 Nov 1975 - 24 May 1999)
- José Alfredo Caires de Nobrega, S.C.I. (30 Oct 2000 - )

== See also ==
- Catholic Church in Madagascar
