= Miarinavaratra =

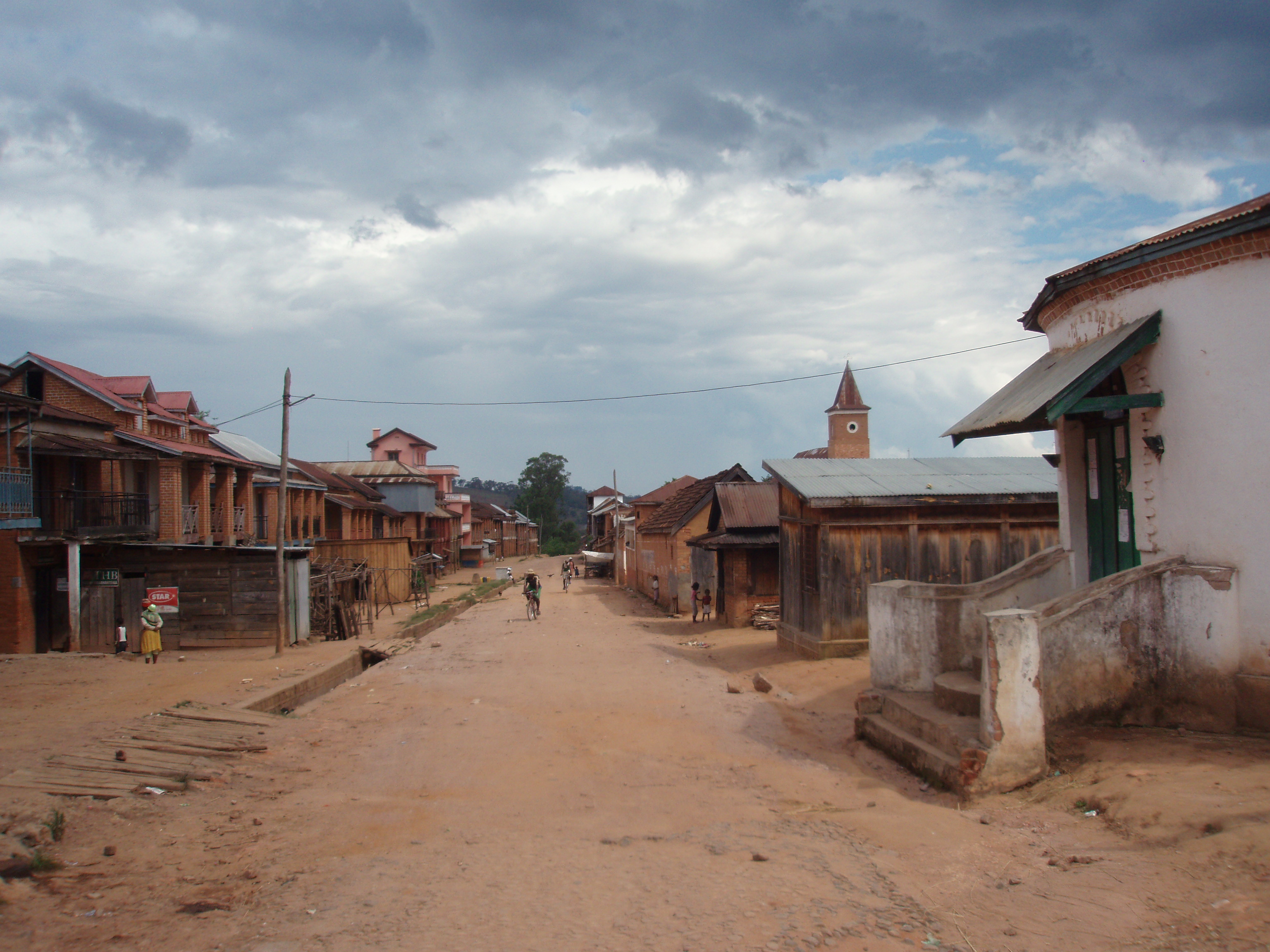
- View along the main street to the East

- Location in Madagascar
- Coordinates: 20°13′S 47°31′E
- Country: Madagascar
- Region: Amoron'i Mania
- District: Fandriana
- Elevation: 1,425 m (4,675 ft)

Population (2001)
  - Total: 19,000
- Time zone: UTC3 (EAT)

Miarinavaratra is a town and commune in Madagascar. It belongs to the district of Fandriana, which is a part of Amoron'i Mania region. The population of the commune was estimated to be approximately 19,000 in the 2001 commune census.

Primary and junior level secondary education are available in town. The majority 98% of the population of the commune are farmers. The most important crops are rice and beans, while other important agricultural products are fruits, sugarcane, cassava and sweet potatoes. Services provide employment for 2% of the population.
