= Roman Catholic Archdiocese of Fianarantsoa =

Roman Catholic archdiocese in Madagascar

Coordinates: 21.4583°S 47.0833°E

Archdiocese of Fianarantsoa Archidioecesis Fianarantsoaensis
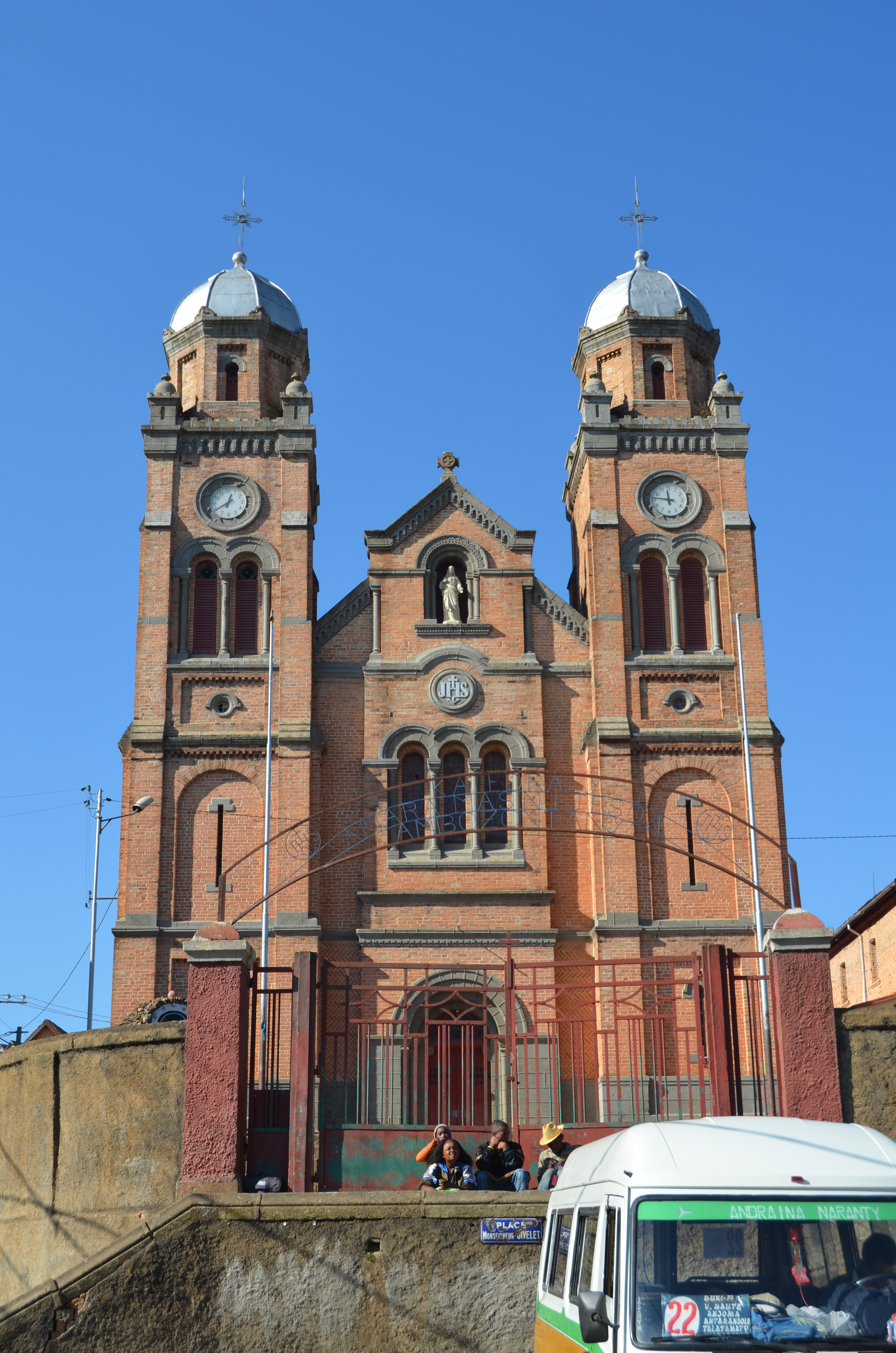

Location
- Country: Madagascar
- Ecclesiastical province: Fianarantsoa

Statistics
- Area: 29,400 km^{2} (11,400 sq mi)
- Population: Total; Catholics: (as of 2018); 1,680,240; 972,615 (57.9%)
- Parishes: 46

Information
- Denomination: Roman Catholic
- Rite: Roman rite
- Established: 10 May 1913
- Cathedral: Cathédrale du Saint-Nom de Jésus

Current leadership
- Pope: Leo XIV
- Metropolitan Archbishop: Fulgence Rabemahafaly

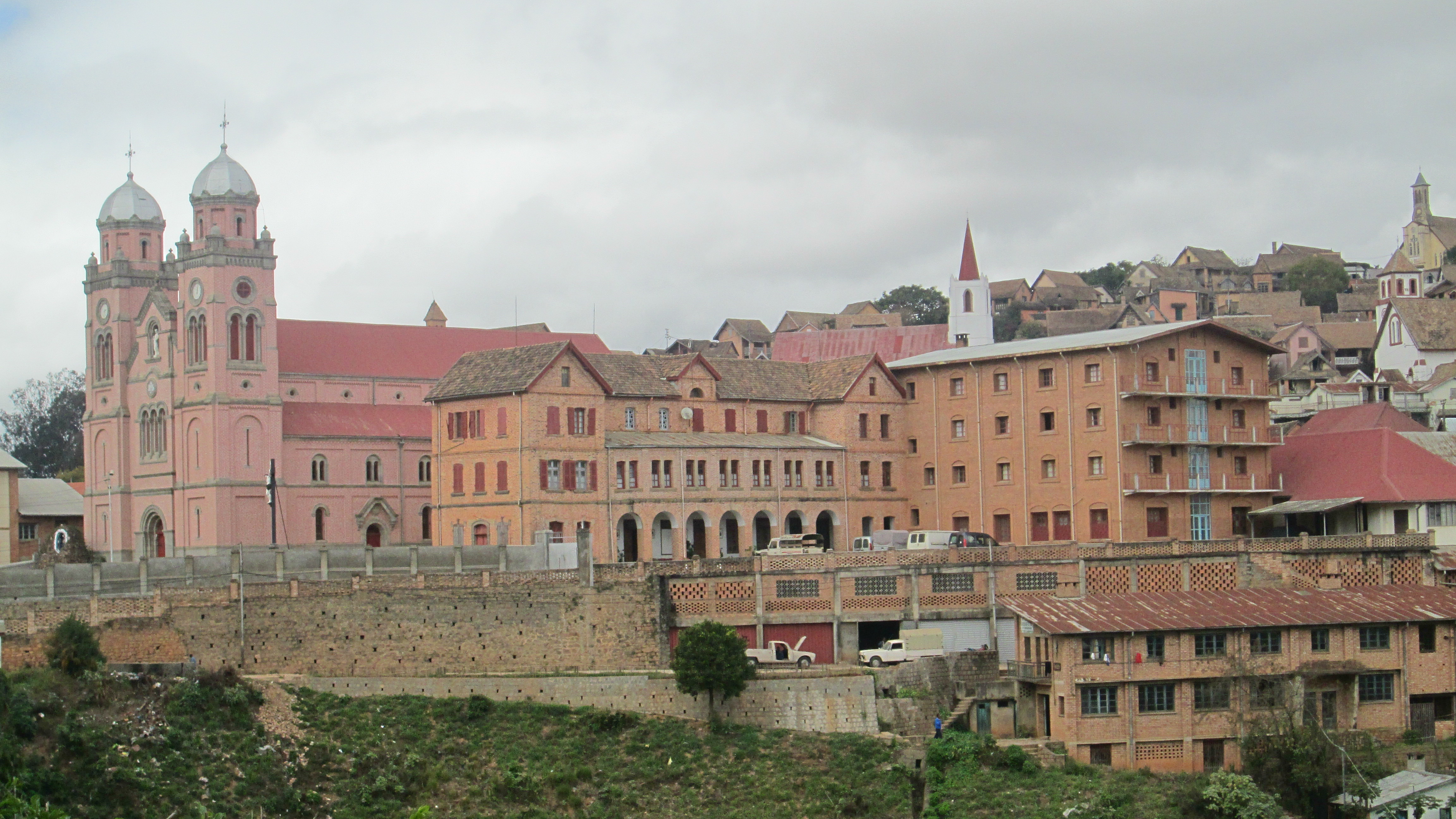

The Roman Catholic Archdiocese of Fianarantsoa is one of the five Catholic Metropolitan Latin Archdioceses in Madagascar, yet depends on the missionary Roman Congregation for the Evangelization of Peoples.

Its cathedral archiepiscopal see is Cathédrale du Saint-Nom de Jésus, dedicated to the Name of Jesus, in Fianarantsoa, Fianarantsoa province.

The present Archbishop is Fulgence Rabemahafaly.

== Ecclesiastical province ==
Its suffragan sees are :

- Diocese of Ambositra, a daughter see
- Diocese of Farafangana
- Diocese of Ihosy
- Diocese of Mananjary, a daughter

== History ==
- Established on 1913.05.10 as Apostolic Vicariate of Fianarantsoa, on vast territory split off from the then Apostolic Vicariate of Central Madagascar.
- Lost territories on 1935.06.18 to establish Apostolic Prefecture of Vatomandry (now Metropolitan Archdiocese of Toamasina) and on 1938.01.08 to establish Apostolic Prefecture of Morondava (now a diocese)
- Promoted on 1955.09.14 as Diocese of Fianarantsoa
- Elevated to Metropolitan Archdiocese of Fianarantsoa on 11 December 1958 during Madagascar's transition from French colony to independence.
- Lost territories again to establish suffragans : on 1968.04.09 Diocese of Mananjary and on 1999.06.03 Diocese of Ambositra
- Enjoyed a Papal visit from Pope John Paul II in May 1989.

== Statistics ==
As per 2014, it pastorally served 831,106 Catholics (56.5% of 1,471,000 total) on 29,400 km^{2} in 42 parishes and 5 missions with 126 priests (60 diocesan, 66 religious), 525 lay religious (210 brothers, 315 sisters) and 78 seminarians.

It had a total population of about 1,153,750 in 2004. About 40.5% of the residents were Catholic. 121 Priests operate in the Archdiocese, making for a ratio of 3,863 Catholics per Priest.

== Bishops ==
=== Ordinaries ===
(all Latin Rite; initially European missionary members of Latin orders)

Apostolic Vicars of Fianarantsoa

- Charles Givelet, Jesuit Order (S.J.) (born France) (1913.05.16 – death 1935.12.09), Titular Bishop of Gindarus (1913.05.16 – 1935.12.09)
- Xavier Ferdinand J. Thoyer, S.J. (born France) (1936.12.23 – 1955.09.14 see below), Titular Bishop of Thuburbo minus (1936.12.23 – 1955.09.14)

Suffragan Bishop of Fianarantsoa

- Xavier Ferdinand J. Thoyer, S.J. (see above 1955.09.14 – 1958.12.11 see below)

Metropolitan Archbishops of Fianarantsoa

- Xavier Ferdinand J. Thoyer, S.J. (see above 1958.12.11 – retired 1962.04.02), emeritate as Titular Archbishop of Odessus (1962.04.02 – death 1970.10.07)
- Gilbert Ramanantoanina, S.J. (first native incumbent) (1962.04.02 – death 1991.01.26), also President of Episcopal Conference of Madagascar (1966 – 1971); succeeded as former Titular Bishop of Acmonia (1960.01.12 – 1962.04.02) and Auxiliary Bishop of Fianarantsoa (1960.01.12 – 1962.04.02)
- Philibert Randriambololona, S.J. (1992.12.17 – retired 2002.10.01); previously Coadjutor Bishop of Antsirabe (Madagascar) (1988.09.01 – 1989.06.19), succeeded as Bishop of Antsirabe (1989.06.19 – 1992.12.17)
- Fulgence Rabemahafaly (2002.10.01 – ...), also Apostolic Administrator of suffragan Ambositra (Madagascar) (2002.12.01 – 2005.06.24), President of Episcopal Conference of Madagascar (2006 – 2012.11); previously Bishop of Ambositra (1999.06.03 – 2002.10.01).

=== Auxiliary Bishop ===
- Gilbert Ramanantoanina, S.J. (1960–1962), appointed Bishop here

=== Other priests of this diocese who became bishops ===
- Fulgence Rabemahafaly, appointed Bishop of Ambositra in 1999; later returned here as Archbishop
- Vincent Rakotozafy, appointed Bishop of Tôlagnaro in 2001
- Odon Marie Arsène Razanakolona, appointed Bishop of Ambanja in 1998

== See also ==
- List of Catholic dioceses in Madagascar
- Catholic Church in Madagascar

== Sources and external links ==
- GCatholic with Google satellite photo - data for all sections
- Catholic-hierarchy.org profile of Archdiocese
