= Ambohimahazo =

- Location in Madagascar
- Coordinates: 20°40′S 47°5′E
- Country: Madagascar
- Region: Amoron'i Mania
- District: Manandriana
- Elevation: 1,414 m (4,639 ft)

Population (2001)
  - Total: 10,000
- Time zone: UTC3 (EAT)

Ambohimahazo is a town and commune in Madagascar. It belongs to the district of Manandriana, which is a part of Amoron'i Mania Region. The population of the commune was estimated to be approximately 10,000 in 2001 commune census.

Primary and junior level secondary education are available in town. Farming and raising livestock provide employment for 45% and 45% of the working population. The most important crop is rice, while other important products are beans, maize, cassava and sweet potatoes. Services provide employment for 5% of the population. Additionally fishing employs 5% of the population.
