= Fandriana District =

- Location in Madagascar
- Coordinates: 20°14′S 47°23′E
- Country: Madagascar
- Region: Amoron'i Mania

Area
  - Total: 2,275 km^{2} (878 sq mi)
- Elevation: 1,391 m (4,564 ft)

Population (2020)
  - Total: 225,574
  - Density: 99.15/km^{2} (256.8/sq mi)
- Postal code: 308

Fandriana District is a district in central Madagascar. It is part of Amoron'i Mania Region. Its capital is Fandriana. The district has an area of 2,275 km^{2} (878 sq mi), and the estimated population in 2020 was 225,574.

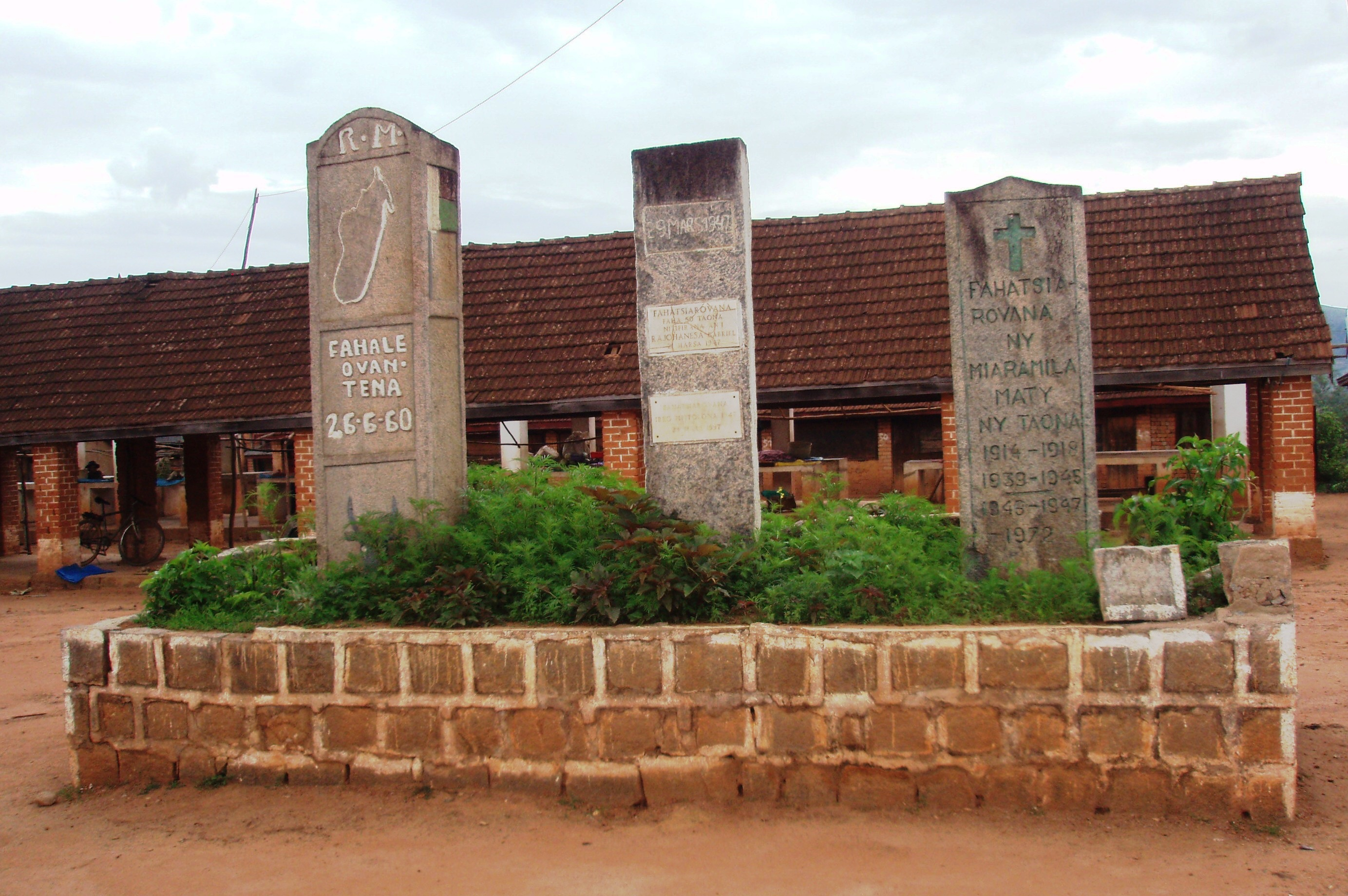
Miarinavaratra Independence Memorial

== Municipalities ==
The district is further divided into 13 communes:

- Alakamisy Ambohimahazo
- Ankarinoro
- Betsimisotra
- Fandriana
- Fiadanana
- Imito
- Mahazoarivo
- Miarinavaratra
- Milamaina
- Sahamadio
- Sandrandahy
- Tatamalaza
- Tsarazaza

== Rivers ==
The Fisakana.
