= Philibert Randriambololona =

Malagasy Roman Catholic archbishop (1927–2018)

Philibert Randriambololona SJ
- Archbishop of Fianarantsoa
- Church: Catholic Church
- Archdiocese: Archdiocese of Fianarantsoa
- In office: 17 December 1992 – 1 October 2002
- Predecessor: Gilbert Ramanantoanina
- Successor: Fulgence Rabemahafaly
- Previous posts: [Diocese of Antsirabe|Bishop of Antsirabe]] (1989-1992); Coadjutor Bishop of Antsirabe (1988-1989)

Orders
- Ordination: 30 July 1961
- Consecration: 27 November 1988 by Victor Razafimahatratra

Personal details
- Born: 1 May 1927 Anjozorobe, Colony of Madagascar and Dependencies, French Empire
- Died: 17 April 2018 (aged 90) Antananarivo, Madagascar

Philibert Randriambololona SJ (1 May 1927 – 17 April 2018) was a Madagascan Catholic prelate who served as Archbishop of Fianarantsoa from 1992 to 2002. He was ordained to the priesthood in 1961 for the Jesuits and served as Coadjutor Bishop of Antsirabe from 1988 to 1989 and as bishop from 1989 to 1992.

== See also ==
- Catholic Church in Madagascar
