= Fandriana =

- Location in Madagascar
- Coordinates: 20°14′S 47°23′E
- Country: Madagascar
- Region: Amoron'i Mania
- District: Fandriana

Government
  - Mayor: Georges Rajaonarisina

Area
  - Total: 260.64 km^{2} (100.63 sq mi)
- Elevation: 1,391 m (4,564 ft)

Population (2018)Census
  - Total: 29,232
- Time zone: UTC3 (EAT)
- Postal code: 308

Fandriana is an urban commune in Central Highlands of Madagascar. It belongs to the district of Fandriana, which is a part of Amoron'i Mania Region. It has a population of 29,232 inhabitants (2018).

The town provides access to hospital services to its citizens. It is also a site of industrial-scale mining.

Farming and raising livestock provides employment for 45% and 35% of the working population. The most important crop is rice, while other important products are cassava and sweet potatoes. Industry and services provide employment for 5% and 15% of the population, respectively.

The town is located at 41 km National Road 41 from Ambositra.

== Rivers ==
The Fisakana.

== Churches ==
One catholic church and two churches of the FLM - Fiangonana Loterana Malagasy (Malagasy Lutheran Church)

== Museums ==
The Rafiliposaona Museum.
