= Route nationale 41 (Madagascar) =

Road in Madagascar

Location
- Country: Madagascar

Highway system
- Roads in Madagascar

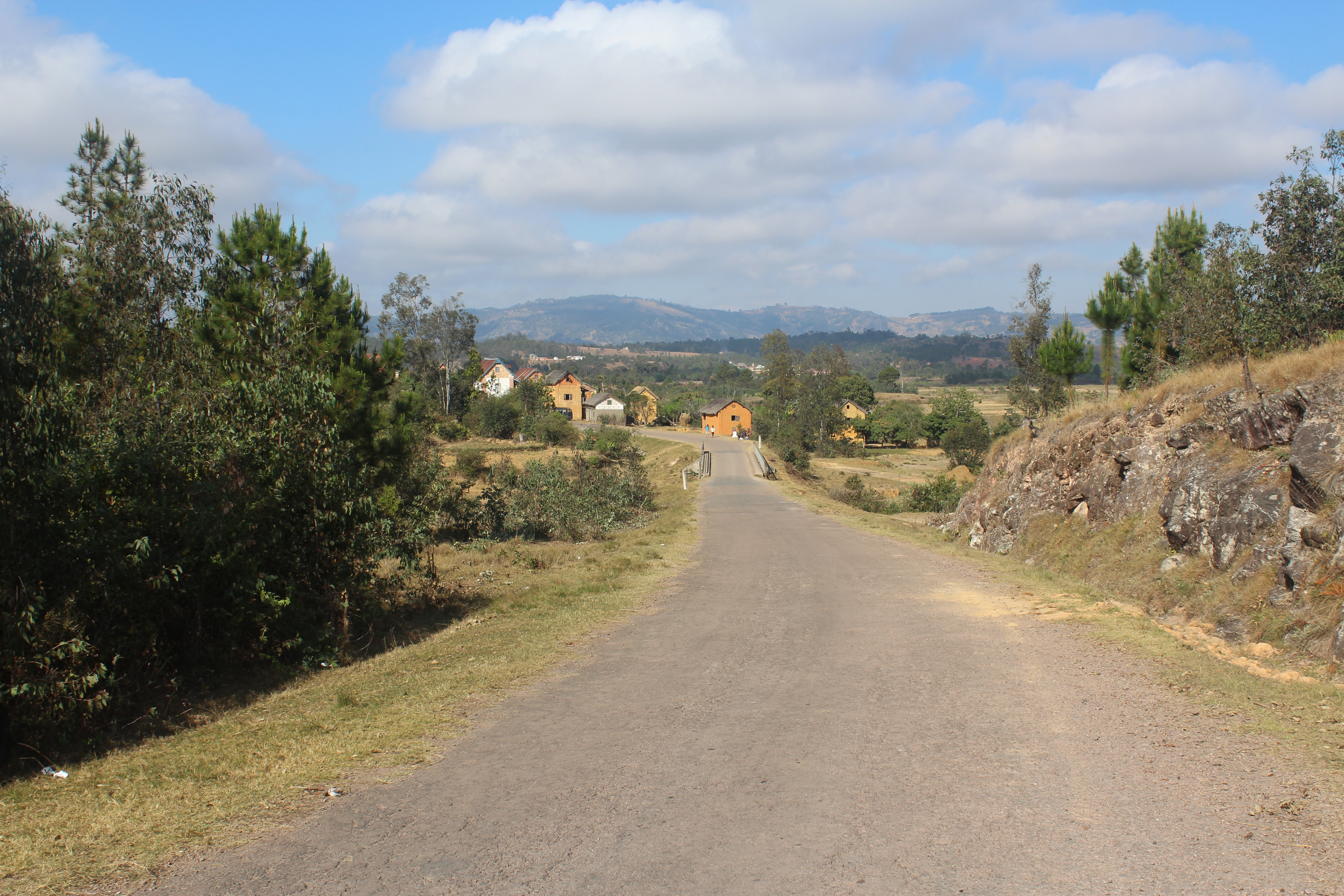
Madagascar RN41

Route nationale 41 (RN 41) is a secondary highway in Madagascar of 41 km, running from Fandriana to the intersection with RN 7. It crosses the region of Amoron'i Mania.

== Selected locations on route ==
(north to south)

- Fandriana - 41 km
- Sandrandahy
- near Ambositra - (intersection with RN 7 at Ikelikapona)

== See also ==
- List of roads in Madagascar
- Transport in Madagascar
