= Ambohimahasoa =

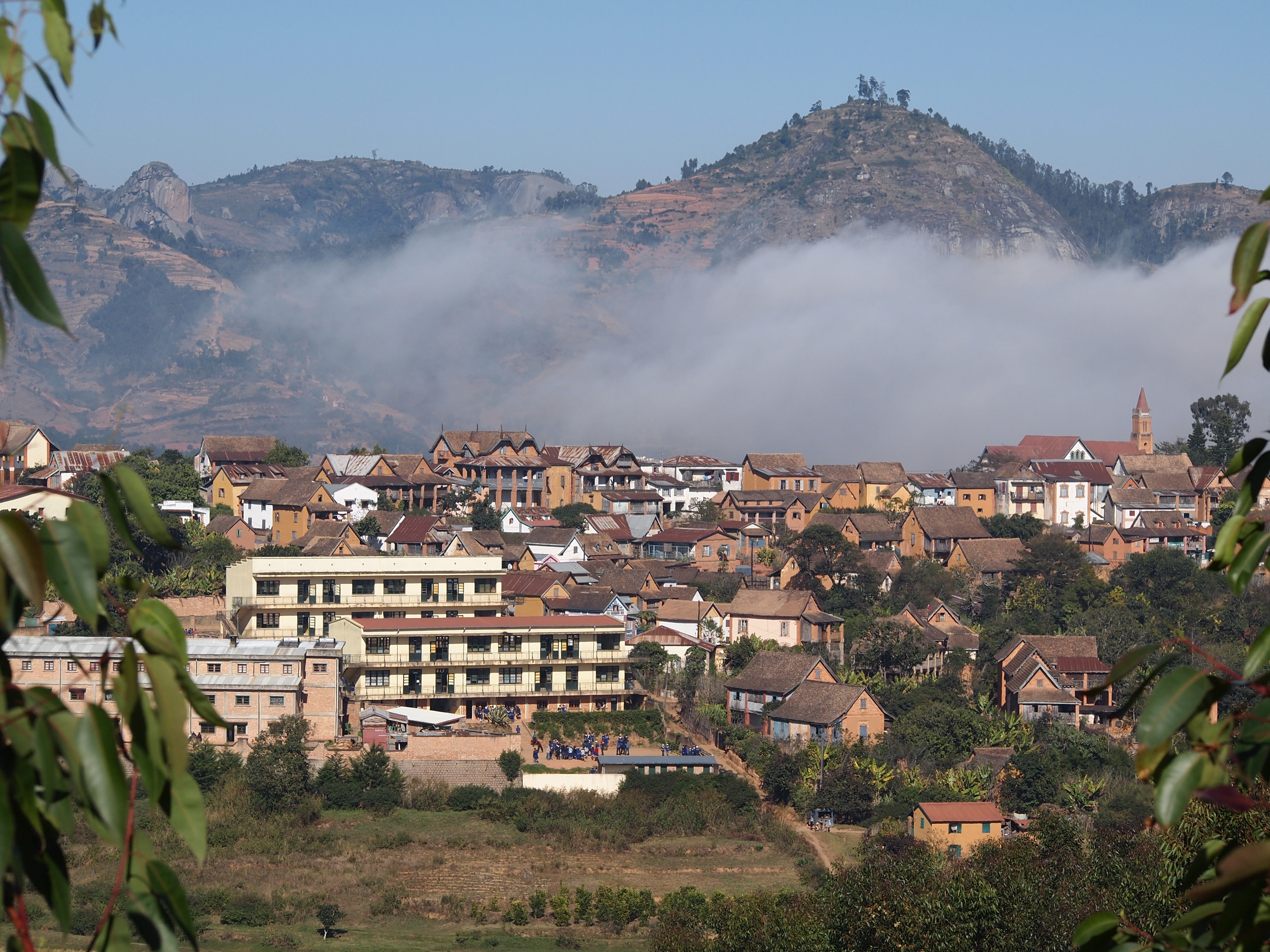
- Ambohimahasoa

- Location in Madagascar
- Coordinates: 21°06′23″S 47°12′58″E
- Country: Madagascar
- Region: Haute Matsiatra
- District: Ambohimahasoa District

Population (2018)
  - Total: 11,606
- Census
- Postal code: 305

Ambohimahasoa is a city in Madagascar, in the Haute Matsiatra region. The city lies in the southern parts of the Central Highlands, near the city of Fianarantsoa.

RN7 connects the city to Antananarivo to the north, and Fianarantsoa and Toliara to the south.

== Roads ==
It is crossed by two national roads: the National road 7 and the National road 25 (from Ambohimahasoa to the East coast, via Irondro to Mananjary)
