= Fulgence Rabemahafaly =

The Most Reverend Fulgence Rabemahafaly
- Archbishop of Fianarantsoa
- Church: Roman Catholic Church
- Archdiocese: Fianarantsoa
- See: Fianarantsoa
- Appointed: 1 October 2002
- Predecessor: Philibert Randriambololona
- Previous post(s): Bishop of Ambositra (1999-2002); Apostolic Administrator of Ambositra (2002-05); President of the Madagascan Episcopal Conference (2006-12)

Orders
- Ordination: 14 August 1980
- Consecration: 31 October 1999 by Philibert Randriambololona

Personal details
- Born: Fulgence Rabemahafaly; 23 May 1951 (age 73); Miarinavaratra, Madagascar

Archbishop Fulgence Rabemahafaly (born 23 May 1951 in Miarinavaratra) is the Archbishop of the Archdiocese of Fianarantsoa in Fianarantsoa, Madagascar. He was ordained as a priest on 14 August 1980 in Fianarantsoa. He was previously the Bishop of the Diocese of Ambositra from June 1999 until his appointment to his current archbishopric on 1 October 2002.
