= Catholic Church in Madagascar =

The Catholic Church in Madagascar is part of the worldwide Catholic Church, under the spiritual leadership of the Pope in Rome.

In 2020, just over a quarter of the population of Madagascar was Catholic. There were almost 2,000 priests and over 5,000 nuns working across 478 parishes.

There are 22 dioceses including five archdioceses. Below is a list of the archdioceses and dioceses, and the archbishops and bishops of each.

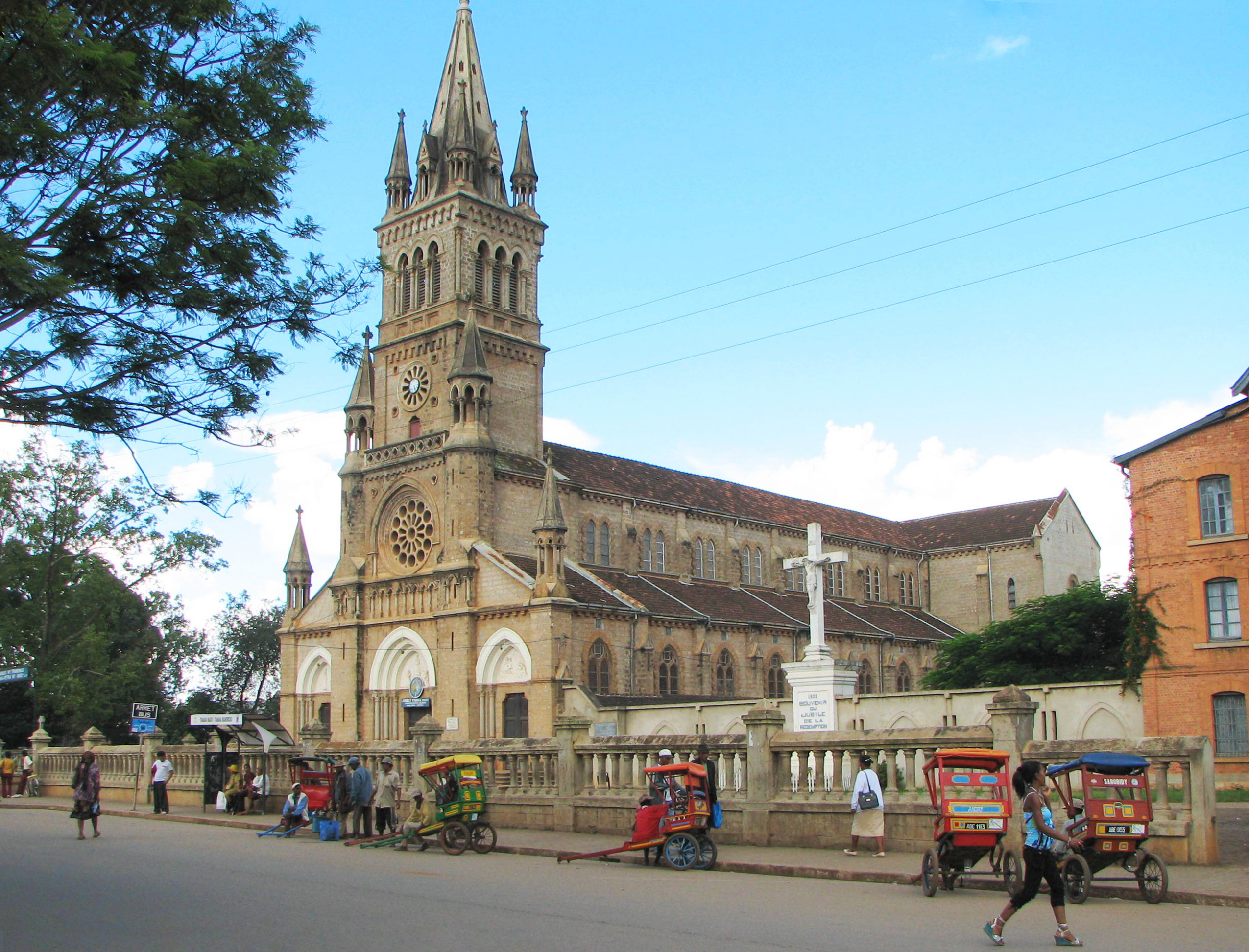
Antsirabe Cathedral

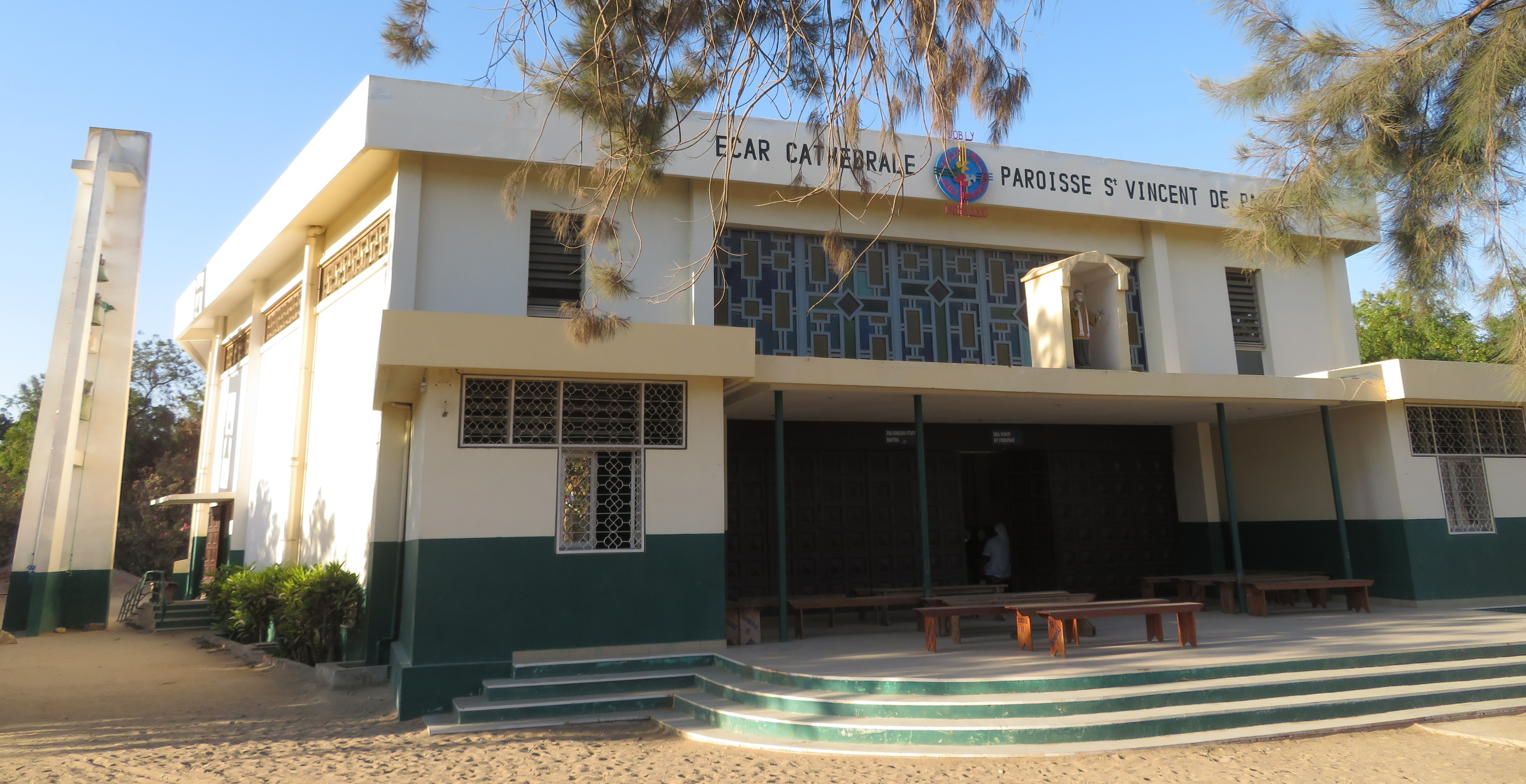
Toliara Cathedral

- Antananarivo – Jean De Dieu Raoelison
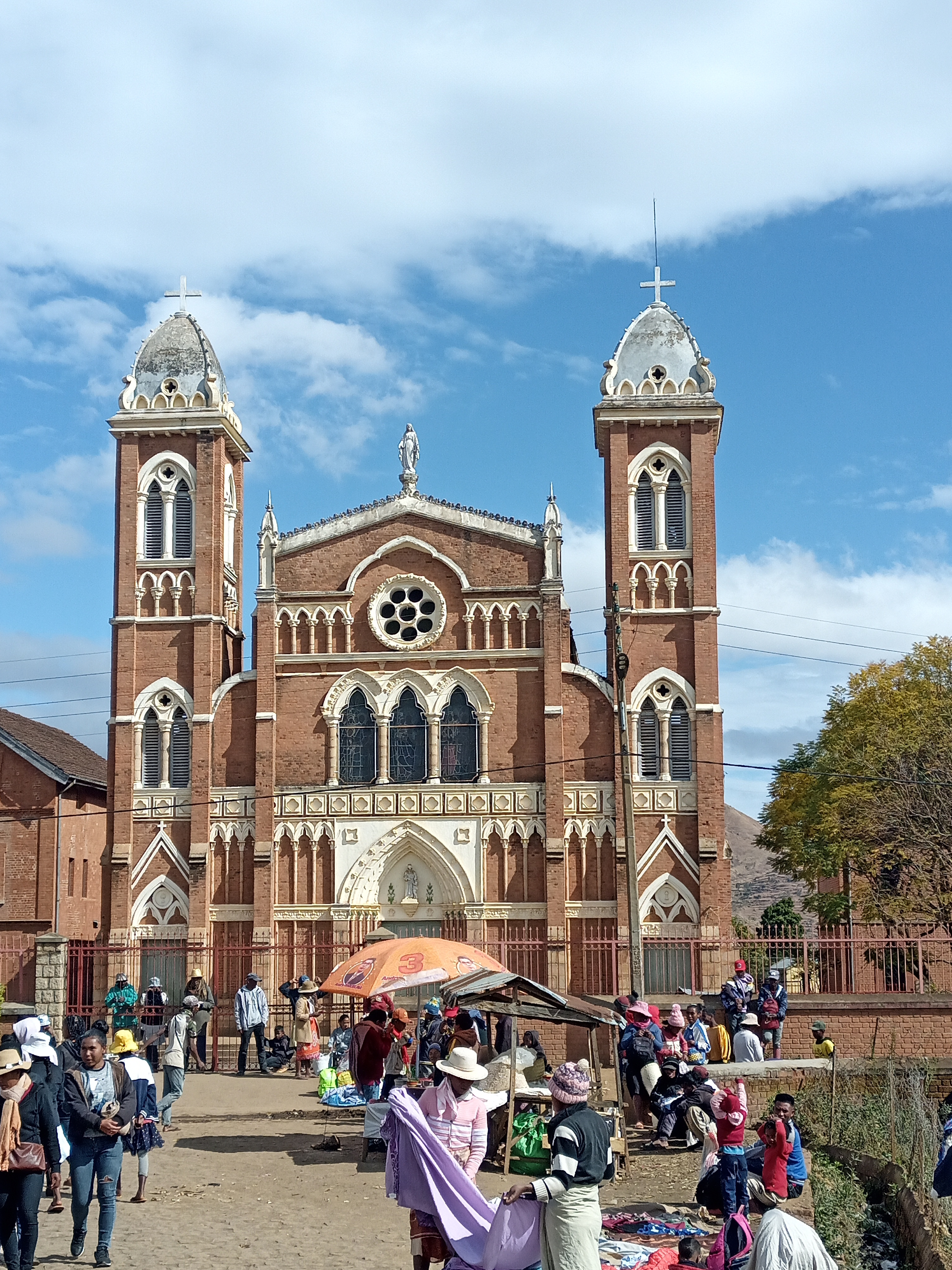
  - Catholic Cathedral in Betafo Antsirabe
    Antsirabe – Jean Pascal Andriantsoavina
  - Miarinarivo – Jean Claude Randrianarisoa
  - Tsiroanomandidy – Gustavo Bombin Espino
  - Maintirano – Clément Hérizo Rakotoasimbola, M.S
- Antsiranana – Michel Malo
  - Ambanja – Rosario Saro Vella, S.D.B.
  - Mahajanga – Joseph Ignace Randrianasolo
  - Port-Bergé – Georges Varkey Puthiyakulangara, MEP
- Fianarantsoa – Fulgence Rabemahafaly
  - Ambositra – Fidelis Rakotonarivo
  - Farafangana – Benjamin Marc Ramaroson
  - Ihosy – Philippe Ranaivomanana
  - Mananjary – José Alfredo Caires de Nobrega
- Toamasina – Desire Tsarahazana
  - Ambatondrazaka – Antoine Scopelliti
  - Fenoarivo Atsinanana – Marcellin Randriamamonjy
  - Moramanga – Marcellin Randriamamonjy
- Toliara – Fulgence Rabeony
  - Morombe – Zygmunt Robaszkiewicz
  - Morondava – Marie Fabien Raharilamboniaina
  - Tôlagnaro – Vincent Rakotozafy

Saint Vincent de Paul is the patron saint of Madagascar.

Caritas Madagascar is the social arm of the Catholic Church in Madagascar, operating all over the country.

== See also ==
- Catholic Church by country
- Christianity in Madagascar
- List of saints from Africa
- Pedro Opeka
- Religion in Madagascar
