= Missionaries of La Salette =

Religious congregation in the Latin Church

Missionaries of Our Lady of La Salette
- Missionarium Saletiniensis (Latin)
- Formation: 1852; 174 years ago
- Founder: Philibert de Bruillard
- Founded at: La Salette, France
- Headquarters: Generalate; Rome, Italy
- Region served: North and South America, Europe, Asia, Australia and Africa.
- Superior General: Jojohn Chettiyakunnel
- Post-nominal initials: MS
- Parent organization: Roman Catholic Church

The Missionaries of Our Lady of La Salette (M.S. - Missionarium Saletiniensis) are a religious congregation of priests and brothers in the Latin Church. They are named after the apparition of Our Lady of La Salette in France. There is also a parallel religious community of sisters called the Missionary Sisters of Our Lady of La Salette. A lay fraternal group of associates also works in cooperation with the vowed religious. The Missionaries are dedicated to making known the message of Our Lady of La Salette, a call to healing of inner brokenness and personal reconciliation with God, especially as found in the first three commandments. The missionaries are popularly known as "the La Salettes."

== Description ==
Statues from the site of the apparition in the tiny mountain village of La Salette, in the commune of Corps France depict Our Lady addressing two children. The distinctive La Salette crucifix bears a small hammer and pincers on either side of the cross as worn by Our Lady. The hammer traditionally symbolizes the instrument that crucified Christ and the pincers symbolize the instrument that removes the nails. The crucifix was adopted by the La Salette as their distinctive symbol.

Worldwide, the religious institute numbers over one thousand members located in North and South America, Europe, Asia, Australia and Africa. In North America the members work in more than a dozen U.S. states and in the Canadian provinces of Quebec and Ontario. The congregation helps maintain devotional religious shrines, such as the National Shrine of Our Lady of La Salette in Attleboro, Massachusetts, and works in various Catholic parishes throughout the country. The La Salette Shrine in Attleboro is particularly well known for its Retreat Center and its "Festival of Lights" during the Christmas season which attracts over 250,000 visitors yearly.

In Latin America, Africa, Australia and Asia, the community does missionary work in a number of countries, including Angola, Argentina, Bolivia, Brazil, India, Madagascar, Myanmar and the Philippines. The congregation continues to care for pilgrims at shrines, serves its University system in the Philippines and conducts retreats at its centers and conducts parish missions, serves in home and foreign missions parishes, guides youth ministries, operates counseling centers, and provides personnel for chaplaincies in hospitals and in the military.

== History ==
The La Salette religious congregation traces its origin to a reported apparition on September 19, 1846 in the small French hamlet of La Salette. The Missionaries of La Salette were founded as a "perpetual remembrance of Mary's merciful Apparition."

The Missionaries of La Salette were founded in 1852 by Philibert de Bruillard (1765 - 1860), the Bishop of Grenoble, in southeastern France, as a testimony to Our Lady's appeal to "make (her message) known to all her people." Immediately thereafter, he assigned some of his priests to care for the numerous pilgrims frequenting the mountain shrine. In 1858 these priests formed a religious community with temporary constitutions, under the immediate charge of the Bishop of Grenoble. In 1876, Amand-Joseph Fava approved their more complete constitution, and in May, 1890, the Institute was approved by Rome, thus becoming a religious community of Pontifical Right.

Finding it hard to recruit from the secular clergy, the congregation founded an Apostolic school or missionary college in 1876. After a six-year classical course, students enter a novitiate where they study the vows and religious life obligations. After profession of their first simple vows of poverty, chastity and obedience, they enter the scholasticate in Rome, to complete their philosophical and theological studies at the Pontifical Gregorian University.

In 1892, after pursuing possible bases in Canada and Texas, five Missionaries established themselves in Hartford, Connecticut with fifteen students. Bishop McMahon of Hartford, Connecticut, welcomed them into his diocese, and they occupied the bishop's former residence. In 1895 they moved to new quarters in Hartford, Connecticut, at the new parish church of Our Lady of Sorrows. The Missionaries began their ministry on Ascension Day of the same year. In 1894, having established themselves in the Diocese of Springfield in Massachusetts, the congregation received the parish of St. Joseph, Fitchburg, Massachusetts. In 1895, member John Berthier formed Missionaries of the Holy Family, which was organized to meet the needs of men who desired to become priests later in their life, and which is a spiritual kin organization to the Missionaries of La Salette. In 1901, at the suggestion of Bishop Beaven of Springfield, the congregation's Superior General sent a few students to Poland to prepare themselves for Polish parishes in the Springfield Diocese.

In 1902 they were received into the Diocese of Sherbrooke, Quebec, Canada and also into the Archdiocese of New York.At the request of Archbishop Langevin of St. Boniface, Canada, a few members were sent from the mother-house in Hartford to establish themselves in West Canada with headquarters at Forget, Saskatchewan from where they served in four parishes. In 1909 the missionaries deemed their institute sufficiently developed, owing to additional foundations in Belgium, Madagascar, Poland, and Brazil, and the superior general petitioned the Holy See to approve their constitutions. The request was granted 29 January 1909. Restrictions against religious institutes in France were lifted in 1914, and a number of the congregations's members served in World War I, with fifteen losing their lives.

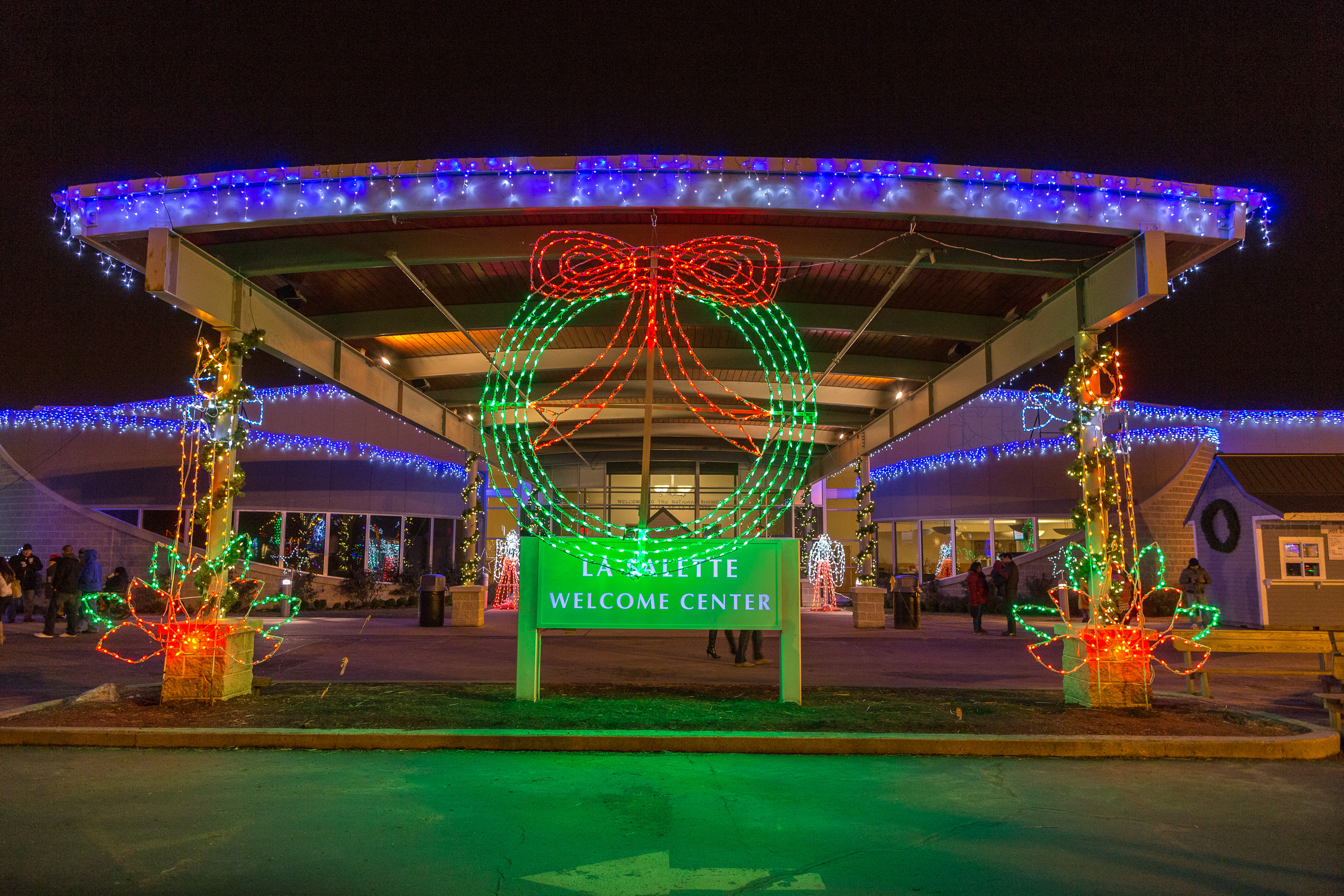
La Salette Shrine in Attleboro, Massachusetts

In North America the institute spread their parish work throughout the United States and Canada. The North American mission first established a province based in Hartford in 1934. Three more province establishments followed at Attleboro (1945), St. Louis (1961) and Georgetown, Illinois (1967). In 2000 these four North American provinces were merged to form one new province for the entire continent, headquartered at Hartford, Connecticut. Missionary work to third world nations steadily expanded throughout the 20th century with the latest expansions in India, Myanmar and Indonesia. There is a national shrine of Our Lady of La Salette at Kayakunnu, Nadavayal, in Wayanad, Kerala, India run by Missionaries of Our Lady of La Salette.

The National Shrine of Our Lady of La Salette was opened in Attleboro, Massachusetts in 1953. The shrine is known for its Christmas Festival of Lights but also offers daily programs and events throughout the year.

== See also ==
- Our Lady of La Salette
- Our Lady of Tears
