= Marigna-sur-Valouse =

Commune in Bourgogne-Franche-Comté, France

- Commune
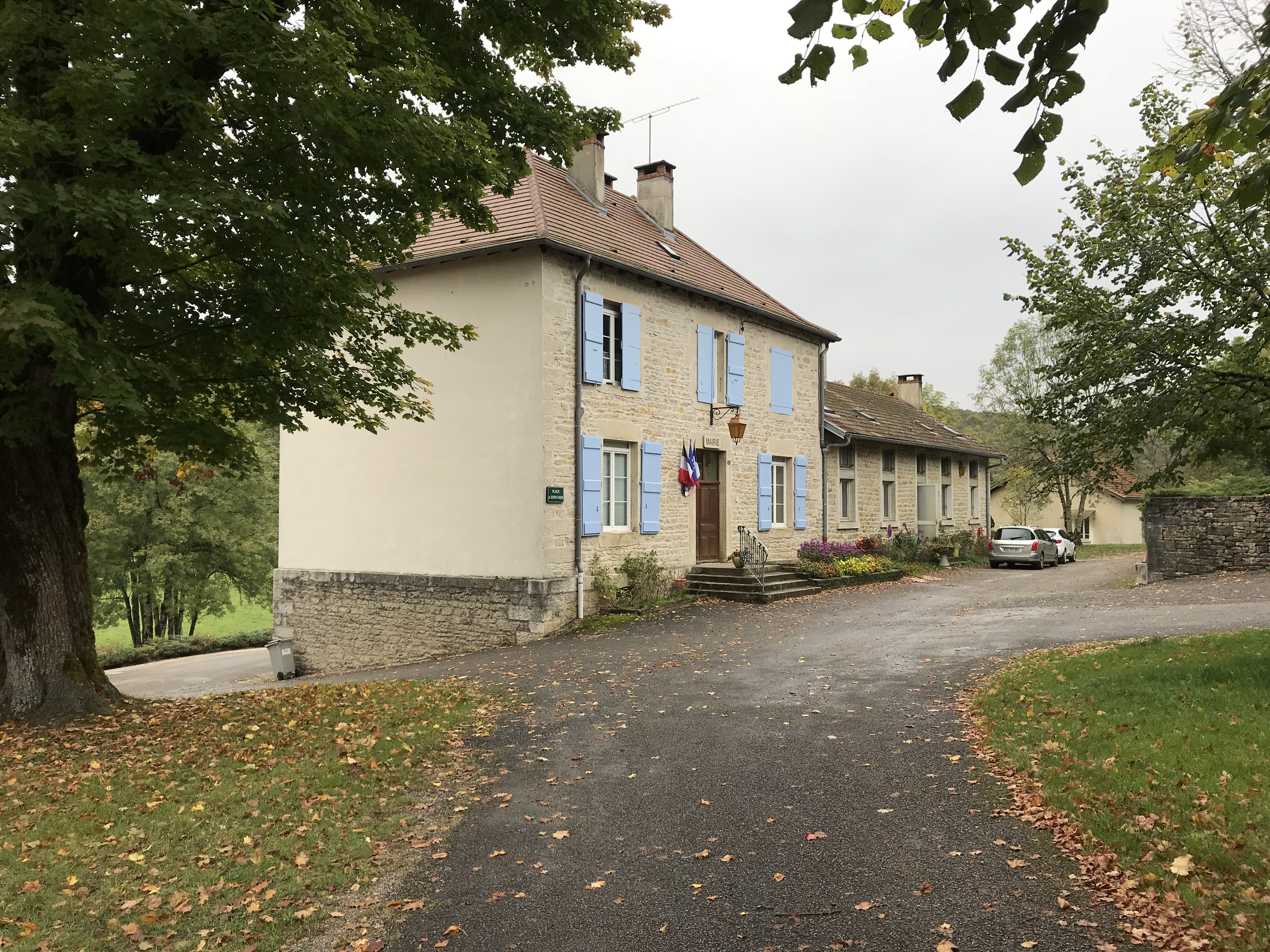
- The town hall in Marigna-sur-Valouse

- Coat of arms
- Location of Marigna-sur-Valouse
- Location within France Location within Bourgogne-Franche-Comté
- Coordinates: 46°26′49″N 5°31′46″E
- Country: France
- Region: Bourgogne-Franche-Comté
- Department: Jura
- Arrondissement: Lons-le-Saunier
- Canton: Moirans-en-Montagne
- Intercommunality: Terre d'Émeraude Communauté

Government
  - Mayor (2020–2026): Pierre Jacquemin
- Area^{1}: 8.35 km^{2} (3.22 sq mi)
- Highest elevation: 598 m (1,962 ft)
- Lowest elevation: 354 m (1,161 ft)
- Population (2023): 107
  - Density: 12.8/km^{2} (33.2/sq mi)
- Time zone: UTC+01:00 (CET)
  - Summer (DST): UTC+02:00 (CEST)
- INSEE/Postal code: 39312 /39240
- ^{1} French Land Register data, which excludes lakes, ponds, glaciers > 1 km^{2} (0.386 sq mi or 247 acres) and river estuaries.

Marigna-sur-Valouse (French pronunciation: [maʁiɲa syʁ valuz]) is a commune in the Jura department and Bourgogne-Franche-Comté region of eastern France.

== Geography ==
The Valouson, a tributary of the Valouse flows through the community. The commune borders

- Nancuise in the North,
- Chambéria in the East,
- Valzin en Petite Montagne in the Southeast together with Savigna and Chatonnay,
- La Boissière in the South,
- Montrevel and Monnetay in the West.

== Population ==
Historical population
Year	Pop.	±% p.a.
1968	97	—
1975	84	−2.03%
1982	82	−0.34%
1990	87	+0.74%
1999	81	−0.79%
2007	107	+3.54%
2012	111	+0.74%
2017	116	+0.89%
2023	107	−1.34%
Source: INSEE

== See also ==
- Communes of the Jura department
