= 1908 =

1908 in various calendars
- Gregorian calendar: 1908; MCMVIII
- Ab urbe condita: 2661
- Armenian calendar: 1357; ԹՎ ՌՅԾԷ
- Assyrian calendar: 6658
- Baháʼí calendar: 64–65
- Balinese saka calendar: 1829–1830
- Bengali calendar: 1314–1315
- Berber calendar: 2858
- British Regnal year: 7 Edw. 7 – 8 Edw. 7
- Buddhist calendar: 2452
- Burmese calendar: 1270
- Byzantine calendar: 7416–7417
- Chinese calendar: 丁未年 (Fire Goat); 4605 or 4398 — to — 戊申年 (Earth Monkey); 4606 or 4399
- Coptic calendar: 1624–1625
- Discordian calendar: 3074
- Ethiopian calendar: 1900–1901
- Hebrew calendar: 5668–5669
- Hindu calendars
- Vikram Samvat: 1964–1965
- Shaka Samvat: 1829–1830
- Kali Yuga: 5008–5009
- Holocene calendar: 11908
- Igbo calendar: 908–909
- Iranian calendar: 1286–1287
- Islamic calendar: 1325–1326
- Japanese calendar: Meiji 41 (明治４１年)
- Javanese calendar: 1837–1838
- Julian calendar: Gregorian minus 13 days
- Korean calendar: 4241
- Minguo calendar: 4 before ROC 民前4年
- Nanakshahi calendar: 440
- Thai solar calendar: 2450–2451
- Tibetan calendar: མེ་མོ་ལུག་ལོ་ (female Fire-Sheep); 2034 or 1653 or 881 — to — ས་ཕོ་སྤྲེ་ལོ་ (male Earth-Monkey); 2035 or 1654 or 882

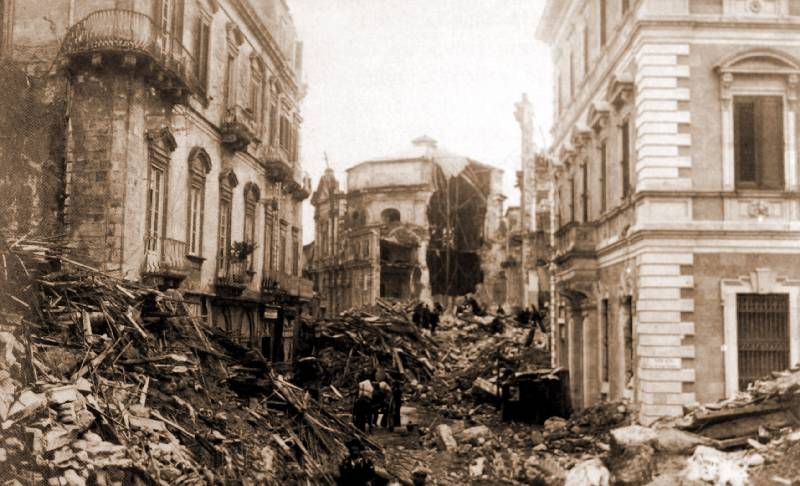
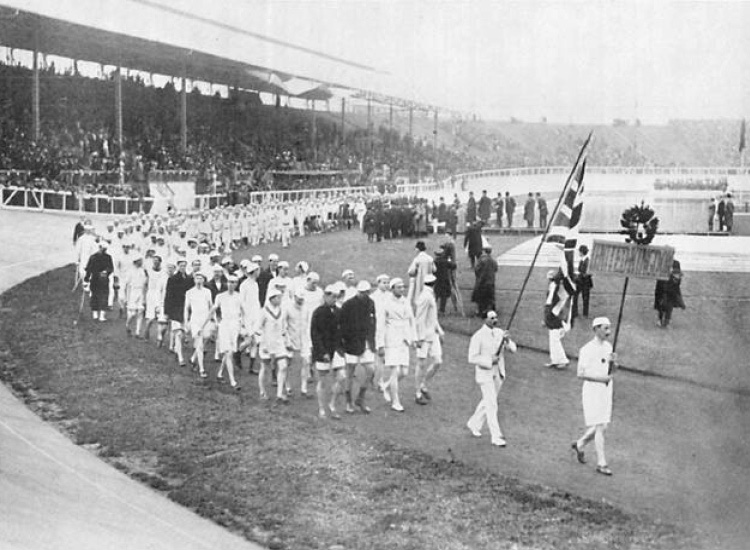
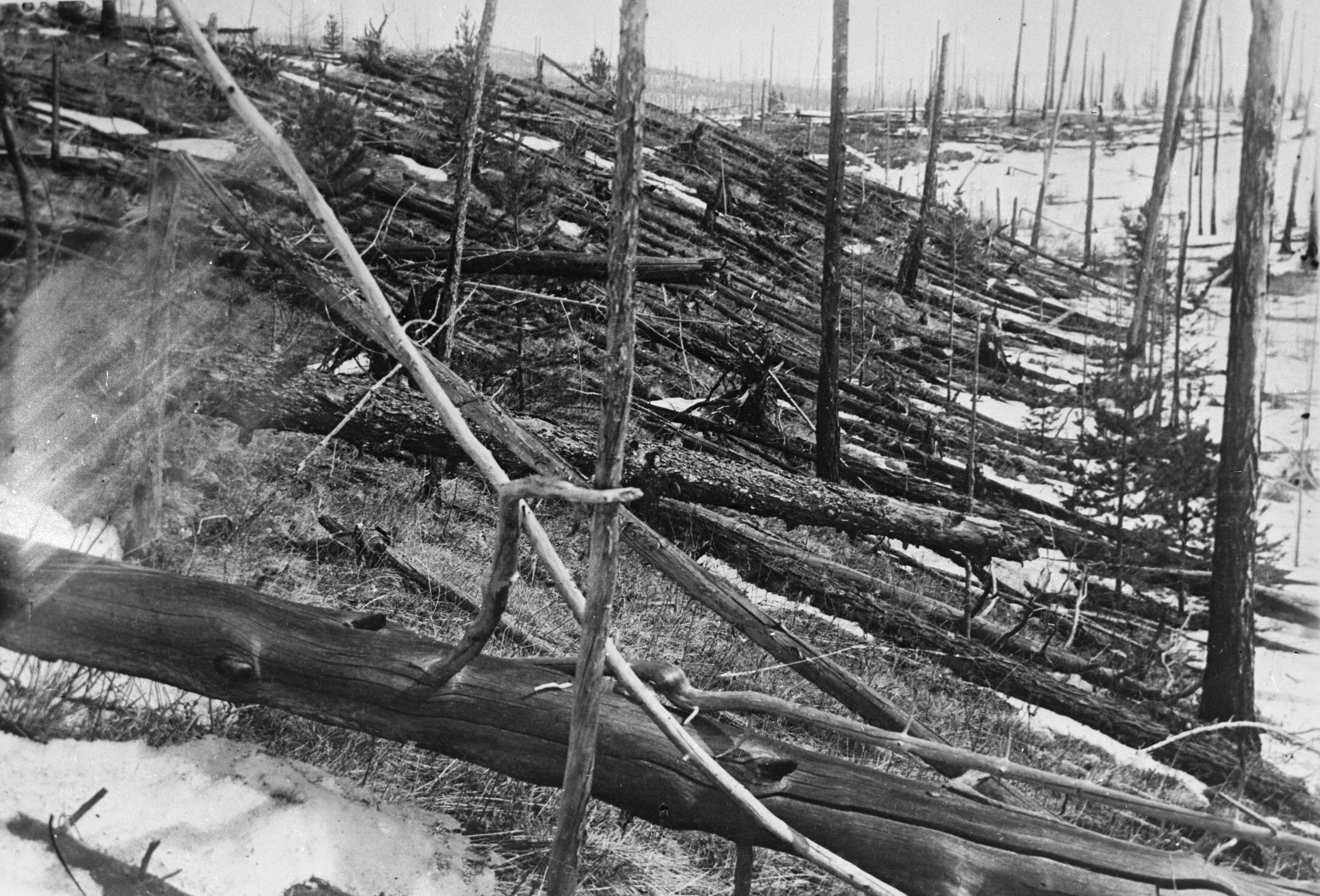
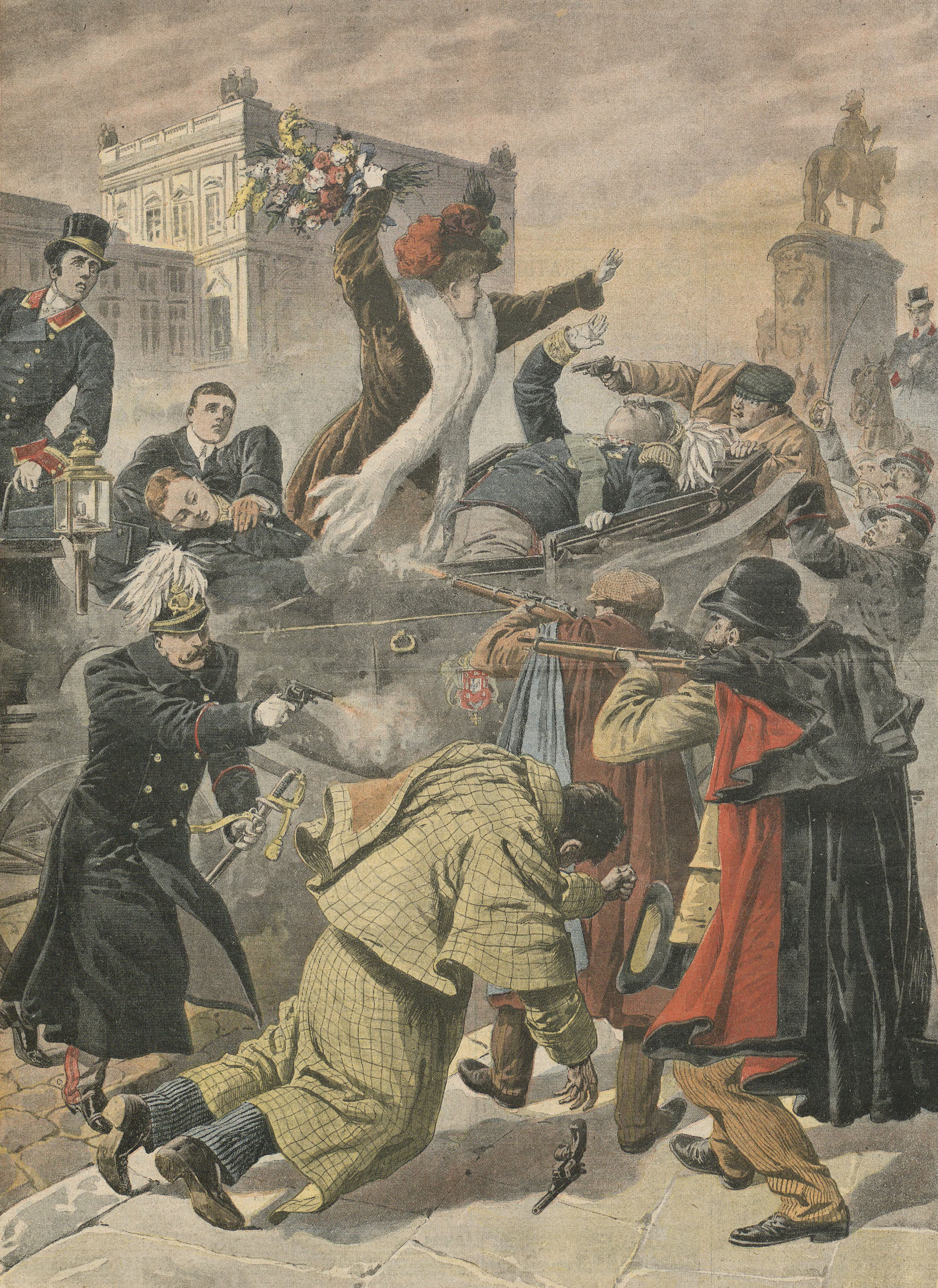
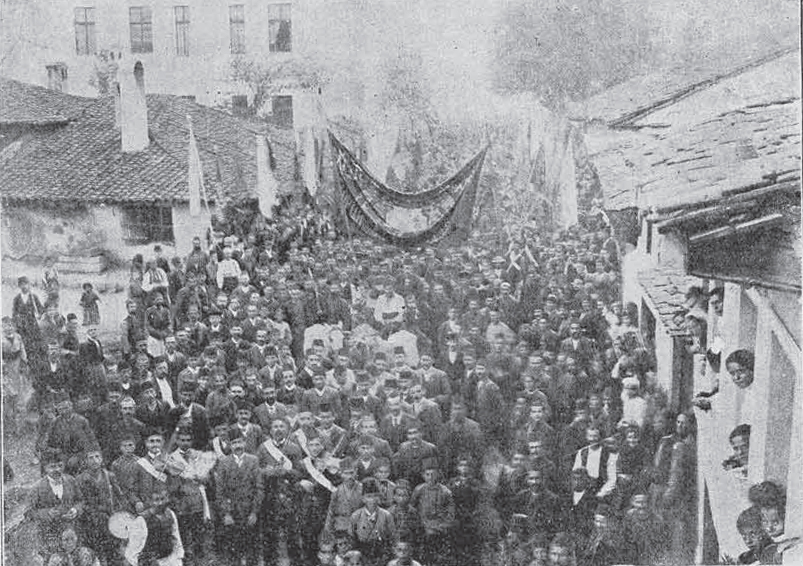
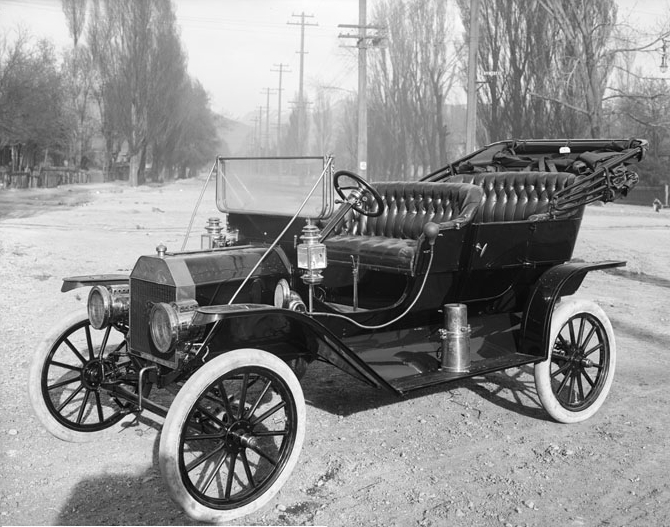
From top to bottom, left to right:
- The devastating 1908 Messina earthquake strikes southern Italy, killing around 82,000 and leveling Messina and Reggio Calabria;
- The 1908 Summer Olympics in London introduce standardized rules and the opening ceremony parade;
- The mysterious Tunguska event flattens over 2,000 square kilometers of Siberian forest, likely from a meteoroid airburst;
- The Lisbon Regicide sees King Carlos I of Portugal and his heir Luís Filipe assassinated, shocking the nation;
- The Young Turk Revolution forces Sultan Abdul Hamid II to restore the Ottoman constitution;
- The Ford Model T begins mass production, revolutionizing global transportation.

1908 (MCMVIII) was a leap year starting on Wednesday of the Gregorian calendar and a leap year starting on Tuesday of the Julian calendar, the 1908th year of the Common Era (CE) and Anno Domini (AD) designations, the 908th year of the 2nd millennium, the 8th year of the 20th century, and the 9th year of the 1900s decade. As of the start of 1908, the Gregorian calendar was 13 days ahead of the Julian calendar, which remained in localized use until 1923.

This is the longest year in either the Julian or Gregorian calendars, having a duration of 31622401.38 seconds of Terrestrial Time (or ephemeris time), measured according to the definition of mean solar time.

Brazilian supercentenarian Inah Canabarro Lucas was the last known person born in 1908 when she died on April 30, 2025.

== Events ==
=== January ===
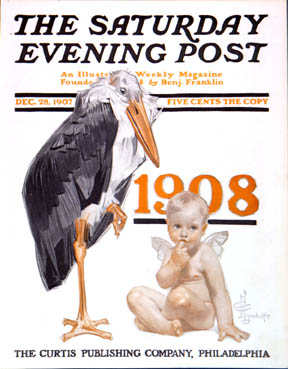
1908 Baby New Year on the cover of The Saturday Evening Post.

January 24: Boy Scout movement.

- January 1 – The British Nimrod Expedition led by Ernest Shackleton sets sail from New Zealand for Antarctica on the Nimrod.
- January 3 – A total solar eclipse is visible in the Pacific Ocean and is the 46th solar eclipse of Solar Saros 130.
- January 13 – A fire breaks out at the Rhoads Opera House in Boyertown, Pennsylvania, killing 171 people.
- January 15 – Alpha Kappa Alpha, the first race inclusive sorority is founded on the campus of Howard University in Washington, D.C.
- January 24 – Robert Baden-Powell's Scouting for Boys begins publication in London. The book eventually sells over 100 million copies, and effectively begins the worldwide Boy Scout movement.

=== February ===
- February 1 – Lisbon Regicide: King Carlos I of Portugal and Prince Luis Filipe are shot dead in Lisbon.
- February 3 – Panathinaikos A.O., a well-known professional multi-sports club of Greece, is founded in Athens.
- February 12 – The first around-the-world car race, the 1908 New York to Paris Race, begins.
- February 29 – The State Normal and Industrial School for Women, precursor to James Madison University, is founded in Harrisonburg, Virginia.

=== March ===
- March
  - A 40,000-year-old Neanderthal boy skeleton is found at Le Moustier in southwest France, by Otto Hauser.
  - Arthur Mee's The Children's Encyclopædia begins publication in London.
  - Clifford W. Beers's memoir of psychiatric abuse, A Mind That Found Itself, was published.
- March 4
  - The Pretoria branch of Transvaal University College, precursor to the University of Pretoria, is established.
  - The Collinwood school fire near Cleveland, Ohio kills 175.
  - Bank of Communications, a major financial services provider in China, is founded in Beijing.
- March 9 – Football Club Internazionale is founded in Milan, Italy.
- March 23 – American diplomat Durham Stevens, an employee of Japan's Ministry of Foreign Affairs, is assassinated in San Francisco by two Korean immigrants, unhappy with his recent support for the increasing Japanese presence in Korea.
- March 27 – The first Scout troop outside the U.K. is formed in Gibraltar.
- March 29 – French aviator Henri Farman makes the world's first flight with a passenger, Léon Delagrange.

=== April ===
- April 8 – H. H. Asquith of the Liberal Party takes office as Prime Minister of the United Kingdom, succeeding Sir Henry Campbell-Bannerman.
- April 20 – Sunshine rail disaster: A rear-end collision of two trains in Melbourne, Australia kills 44 people and injures more than 400.
- April 21 – Frederick Cook claims to have reached the North Pole on this date.

=== May ===
- May 14–October 31 – The Franco-British Exhibition (1908) is held in London.
- May 26 – At Masjed Soleyman in southwest Persia, the first major commercial oil discovery in the Middle East is made. The rights to the resource are quickly acquired by the United Kingdom.

=== June ===
- June 26 – Carl Gustaf Emil Mannerheim, a future President of Finland, meets the 13th Dalai Lama in Shanxi, China, becoming only the third European to be granted an audience with him.
- June 28 – An annular solar eclipse is visible from Central America, North America, Atlantic Ocean and Africa and is the 33rd solar eclipse of Solar Saros 135.
- June 29 – Kohlerer-Bahn by Bleichert opens in Bolzano, South Tyrol, the first modern aerial enclosed cable car solely for passenger service.
- June 30 (June 17 OS) – The Tunguska event near the Podkamennaya Tunguska River in Krasnoyarsk Krai, Siberia, Russian Empire, is believed to have been caused by the air burst of a large meteoroid or comet fragment, at an altitude of 5–10 kilometres (3–6 mi) above the Earth's surface.

=== July ===
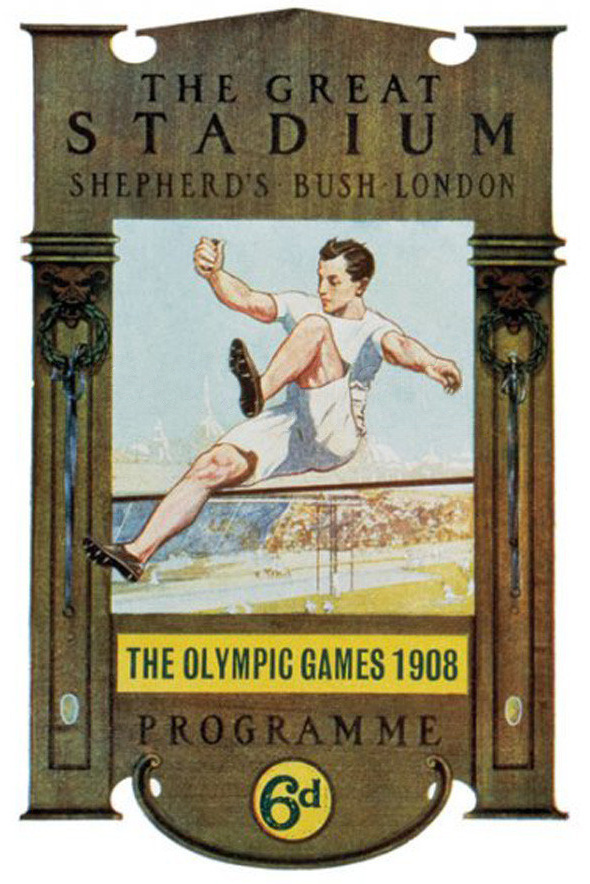
July: 1908 Summer Olympics.

- July 1 – S̅O̅S̅ comes into force internationally as a distress signal (originally for ship-to-shore wireless telegraphy).
- July 3 – Young Turk Revolution in the Ottoman Empire: Major Ahmed Niyazi, with 200 followers (Ottoman troops and civilians), begins an open revolution by defecting from the 3rd Army Corps in Macedonia, decamping into the hill country.
- July 6 – Robert Peary sets sail for the North Pole.
- July 8 – French aviator Léon Delagrange makes the world's first flight with a female passenger, his partner and fellow sculptor Thérèse Peltier.
- July 11–12 – The steamship Amalthea, housing 80 British strikebreakers in Malmö harbour, Sweden, is bombed by Anton Nilson; 1 is killed, 20 injured.
- July 13–25 – The 1908 Summer Olympics are held in London. (Originally scheduled to be in Rome, but changed due to the Mount Vesuvius eruption of 1906. Figure skating events are held in London from October 28–29.)
- July 19 – Feyenoord, the first Dutch football club to win the UEFA Champions League, is founded at Rotterdam, Netherlands
- July 23 – Young Turk Revolution: The Committee of Union and Progress (CUP) issues a formal ultimatum to Sultan Abdul Hamid II, to restore the constitution of 1876 within the Ottoman Empire; it is restored the following day.
- July 24 – Italian Dorando Pietri wins the Olympic marathon (run from Windsor Castle to London) in one of the most dramatic arrivals in Olympic history, only to be disqualified soon afterwards for receiving assistance; victory is awarded to Irish-American Johnny Hayes.
- July 26 – The Federal Bureau of Investigation is founded in the United States.
- July 27–28 – The 1908 Hong Kong typhoon sinks the passenger steamer Ying King, causing 421 deaths.*July 29 - The White Star Line company begins the construction of the Titanic

=== August ===
- August 8
  - Wilbur Wright flies in France for the first time, demonstrating controlled powered flight in Europe.
  - The Hoover Company of Canton, Ohio, acquires manufacturing rights to the upright portable vacuum cleaner patented on June 22 by James M. Spangler.
- August 17 – “Fantasmagorie”, an animated short film by Émile Cohl, which is widely regarded as the first animated cartoon is officially released.
- August 24 – After an intense power struggle, Sultan Abdelaziz of Morocco is deposed and is succeeded by his brother Abd al-Hafid.
- August 28 – American Messenger Company, predecessor of United Parcel Service, is founded in Washington (state).

=== September ===
- September 10 – The first Minas Geraes-class Dreadnought battleship for Brazil, Minas Geraes, is launched at Armstrong Whitworth's yard on the River Tyne in England, catalysing the "South American dreadnought race".
- September 17 – At Fort Myer, Virginia, Thomas Selfridge becomes the first person to die in an airplane crash. The pilot, Orville Wright, is severely injured in the crash but recovers.
- September 28 – Classes begin at Benjamin Franklin Institute of Technology in Boston, Massachusetts, established under the terms of Franklin's will.

=== October ===
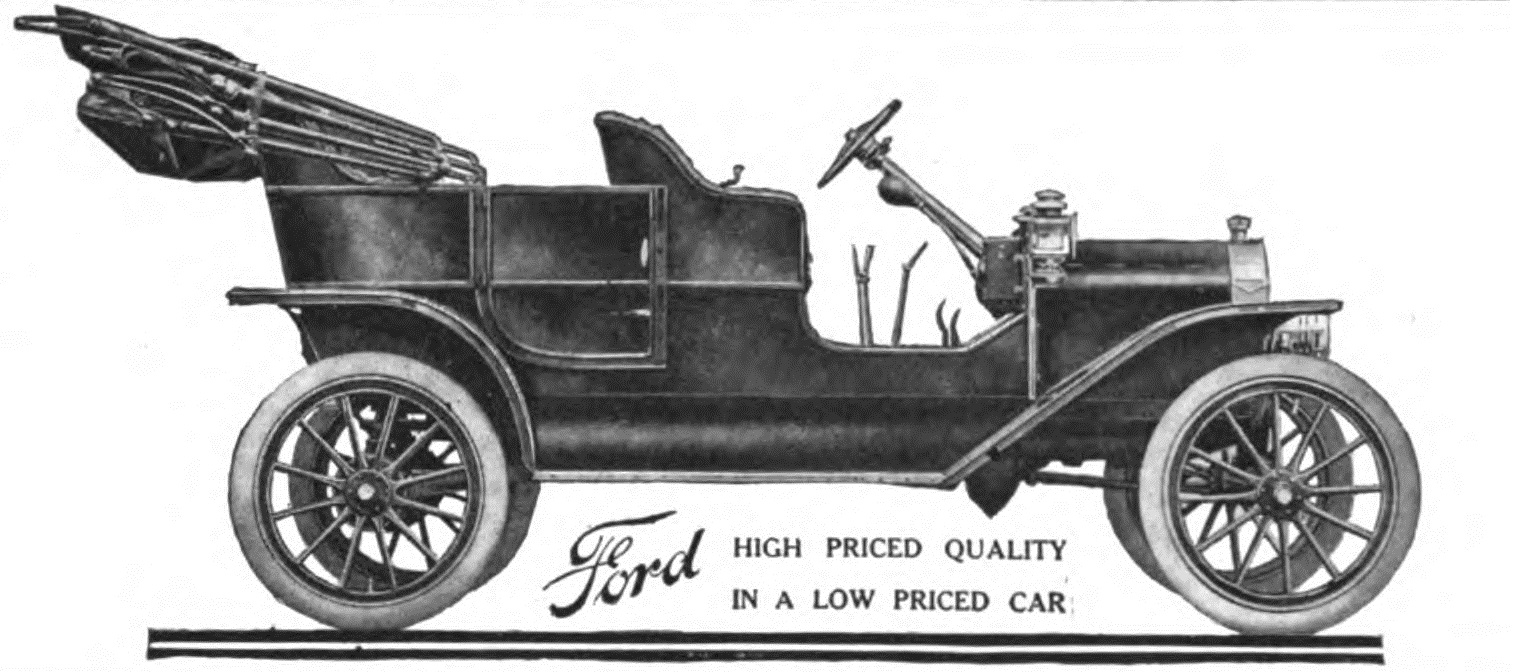
October 1: Ford Model T launch.

- October 1
  - Official launch of Henry Ford's Ford Model T automobile, the first having left the Ford Piquette Avenue Plant in Detroit, Michigan, on September 27. The initial price is set at US$850.
  - Penny Post is established between the United Kingdom and United States.
- October 5 – Bulgaria declares its independence from the Ottoman Empire; Ferdinand I of Bulgaria becomes Tsar.
- October 6 – The Bosnian crisis begins, after the Austro-Hungarian Empire annexes Bosnia and Herzegovina from the Ottoman Empire.
- October 8 – The University of Omaha, precursor of the University of Nebraska Omaha, is founded as a private non-sectarian college.
- October 29 – Olivetti, the well-known typewriter and business equipment company, is founded in Italy.

=== November ===
- November 3 – 1908 United States presidential election: Republican candidate William Howard Taft defeats William Jennings Bryan, 321 electoral votes to 162.
- November 6 – Western bandits Butch Cassidy and the Sundance Kid are supposedly killed in Bolivia, after being surrounded by a large group of soldiers. There are many rumors to the contrary however, and their grave sites are unmarked.
- November 14 – The Guangxu Emperor of China dies, probably poisoned. The following day, his aunt and the power behind the throne, Empress Dowager Cixi, dies.
- November 15 – King Leopold II of Belgium formally relinquishes his personal control of the Congo Free State (becoming Belgian Congo) to Belgium, following evidence collected by Roger Casement of maladministration.
- November 19 – Women's suffrage is passed in Victoria, Australia.
- November 25
  - The Christian Science Monitor newspaper is first published, in the United States.
  - A fire breaks out on SS Sardinia as it leaves Malta's Grand Harbour, resulting in the ship's grounding and the deaths of at least 118 people.

=== December ===
- December 2 – Emperor Puyi ascends the Chinese throne at age 2 in succession to his uncle. He will reign for 3 years, then again for 11 days, and finally for 11 years as a puppet emperor.
- December 16 – Construction begins on the RMS Olympic, at the Harland and Wolff Shipyard in Belfast.
- December 23 – A hybrid solar eclipse is visible from Atlantic Ocean and is the 23rd solar eclipse of Solar Saros 140.
- December 28 – The 7.1 M_{w} Messina earthquake shakes Southern Italy with a maximum Mercalli intensity of XI (Extreme), killing between 75,000 and 200,000.

=== Undated ===
- This is the coldest recorded year since 1880, according to NASA reports.

== Births ==
=== January ===
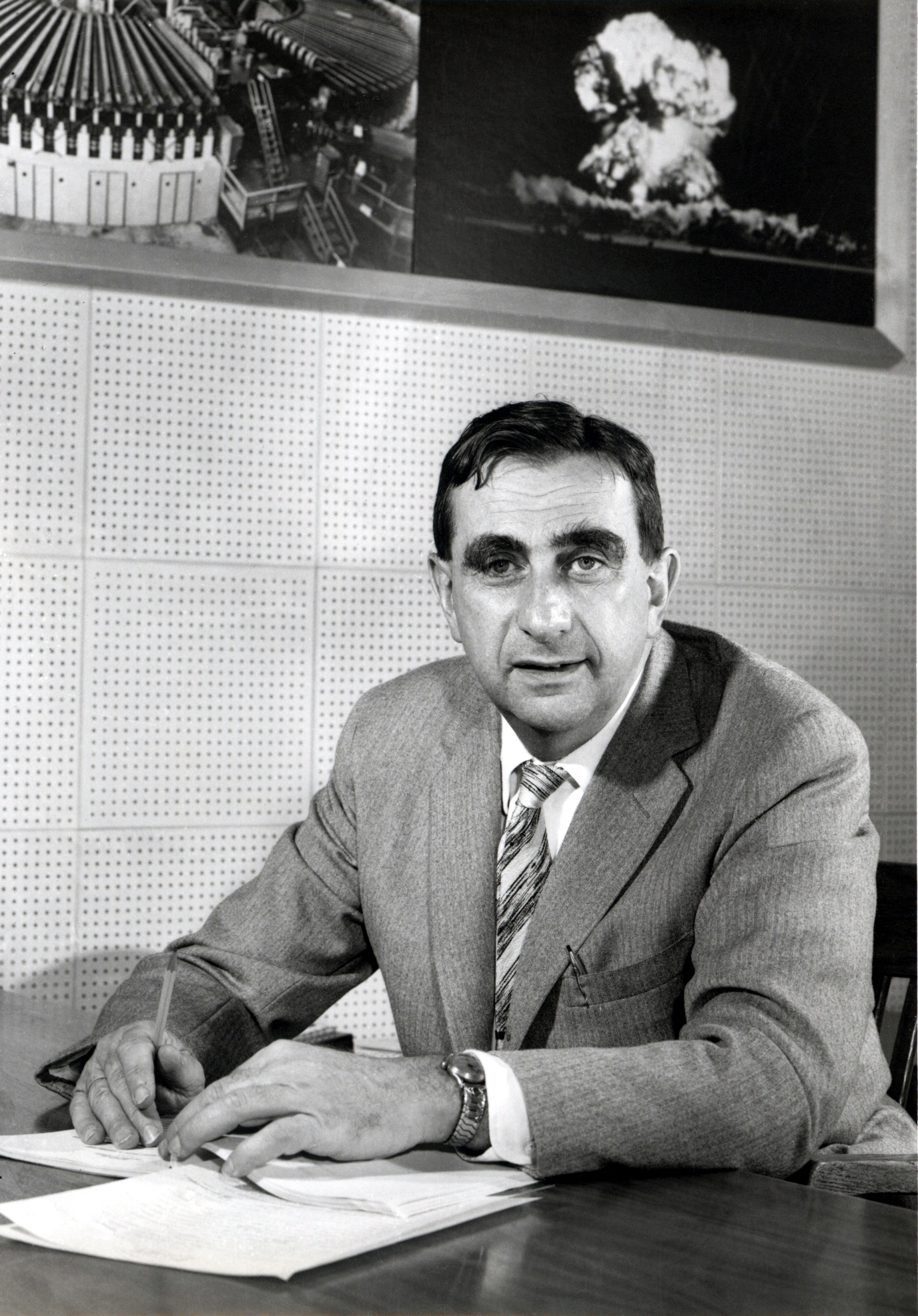
Edward Teller

- January 8
  - William Hartnell, British actor (died 1975)
  - Fearless Nadia (Mary Evans), Indian actress (died 1996)
- January 9 – Simone de Beauvoir, French feminist writer (died 1986)
- January 10 – Paul Henreid, Austrian-born American actor (died 1992)
- January 15 – Edward Teller, Hungarian-born American physicist (died 2003)
- January 16
  - Günther Prien, German submarine commander (died 1941)
  - Ethel Merman, American singer and actress (died 1984)
- January 22 – Lev Landau, Russian physicist, Nobel Prize laureate (died 1968)
- January 26 – Stéphane Grappelli, French jazz violinist and composer (died 1997)

=== February ===
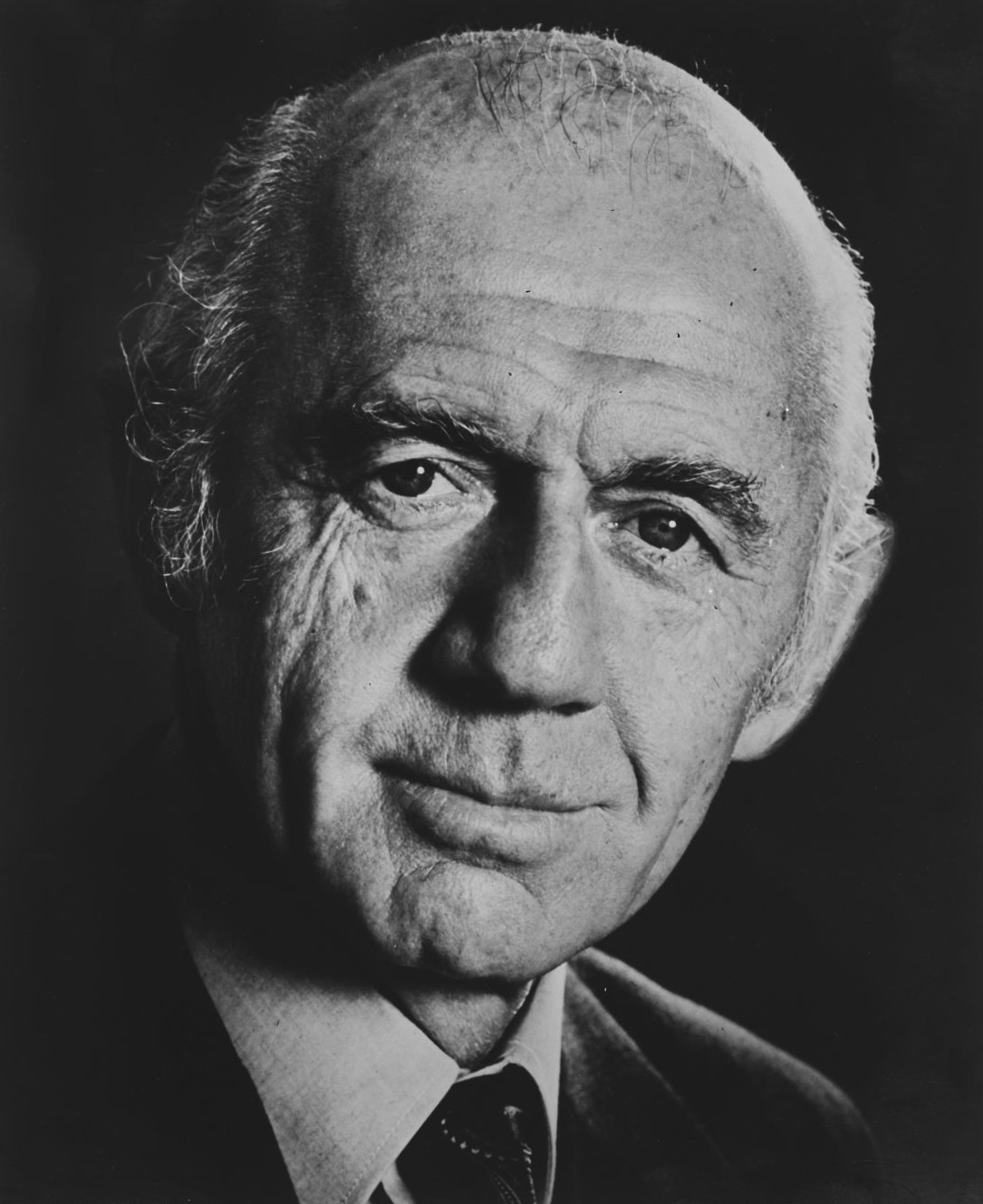
Sir William McMahon

- February 1 – George Pal, Hungarian-born American animator (died 1980)
- February 5 – Peg Entwistle, Welsh actress (died 1932)
- February 6 – Amintore Fanfani, 32nd Prime Minister of Italy (died 1999)
- February 7 – Buster Crabbe, American swimmer, actor (died 1983)
- February 11 – Vivian Fuchs, English geologist, explorer (died 1999)
- February 17 – Bo Yibo, Chinese politician (died 2007)
- February 22
  - Rómulo Betancourt, President of Venezuela (died 1981)
  - John Mills, English actor (died 2005)
- February 23 – Sir William McMahon, 20th Prime Minister of Australia (died 1988)
- February 26
  - Tex Avery, American cartoonist (died 1980)
  - Nestor Mesta Chayres, Mexican operatic tenor and bolero vocalist (died 1971)
  - Jean-Pierre Wimille, French racing driver (died 1949)
- February 29 – Balthus, French painter (died 2001)

=== March ===
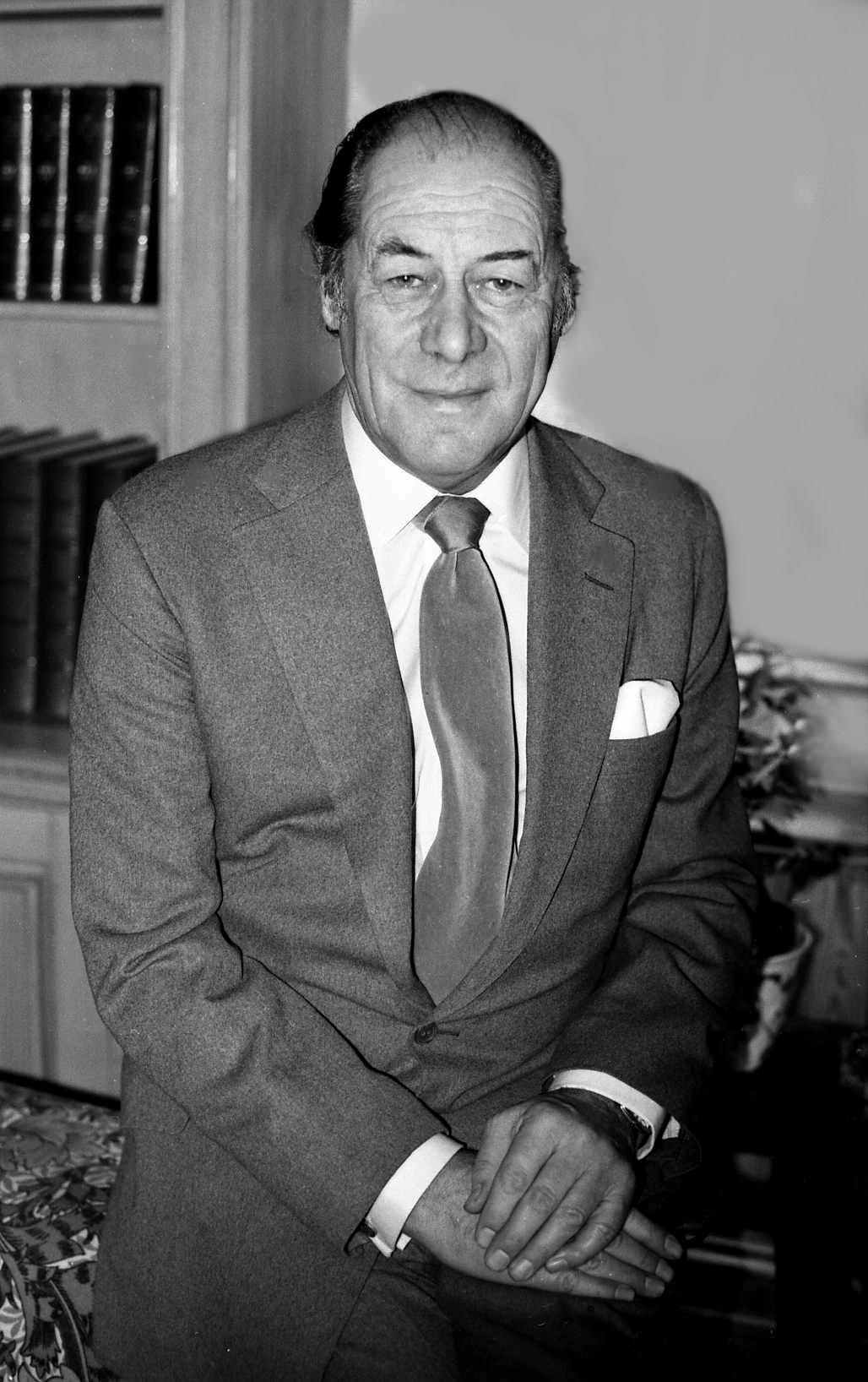
Rex Harrison

- March 2 – Walter Bruch, German engineer (died 1990)
- March 5 – Rex Harrison, English actor (died 1990)
- March 7 – Anna Magnani, Italian actress (died 1973)
- March 18 – Ivor Moreton, British singer and pianist (died 1984)
- March 20 – Michael Redgrave, English actor (died 1985)
- March 22 – Louis L'Amour, American author (died 1988)
- March 25 – David Lean, English film director (died 1991)
- March 29 – Arthur O'Connell, American actor (died 1981)

=== April ===
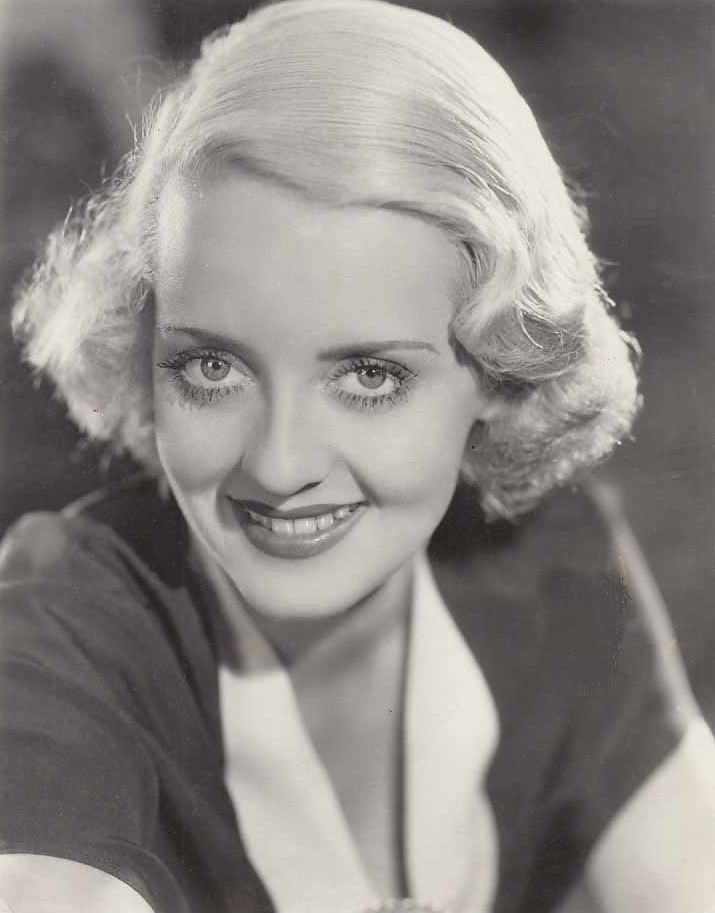
Bette Davis

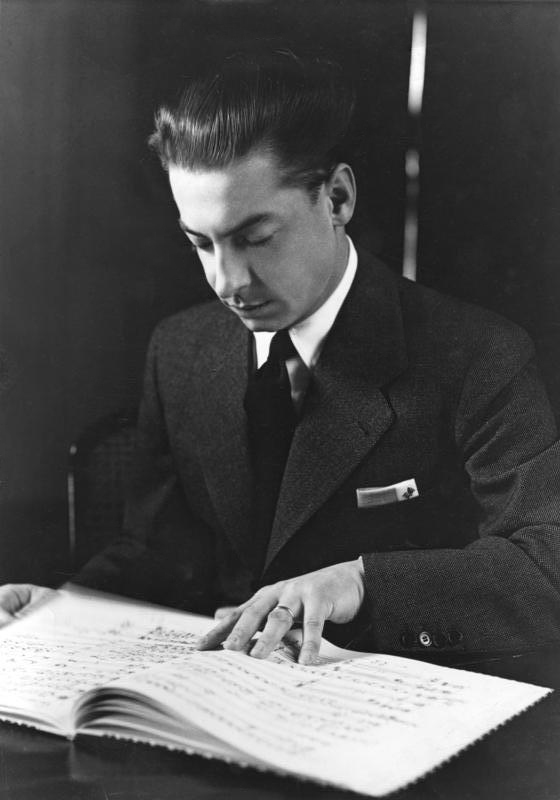
Herbert von Karajan

- April 1 – Abraham Maslow, American psychologist (died 1970)
- April 2 – Buddy Ebsen, American actor and dancer (died 2003)
- April 5
  - Bette Davis, American actress (died 1989)
  - Herbert von Karajan, Austrian conductor (died 1989)
- April 7 – Percy Faith, Canadian-born American composer, musician (died 1976)
- April 11
  - Masaru Ibuka, Japanese electronics industrialist (died 1997)
  - Dan Maskell, British tennis coach, commentator (died 1992)
- April 12 – Carlos Lleras Restrepo, President of Colombia (died 1994)
- April 15 – Lita Grey, American actress (died 1995)
- April 20 – Lionel Hampton, African-American musician and bandleader (died 2002)
- April 24 – Józef Gosławski, Polish sculptor, medallic artist (died 1963)
- April 25 – Edward R. Murrow, American journalist (died 1965)
- April 28 – Oskar Schindler, German industrialist and humanitarian (died 1974)
- April 29 – Jack Williamson, American science fiction author (died 2006)
- April 30
  - Eve Arden, American actress (died 1990)
  - Bjarni Benediktsson, 11th prime minister of Iceland (died 1970)

=== May ===
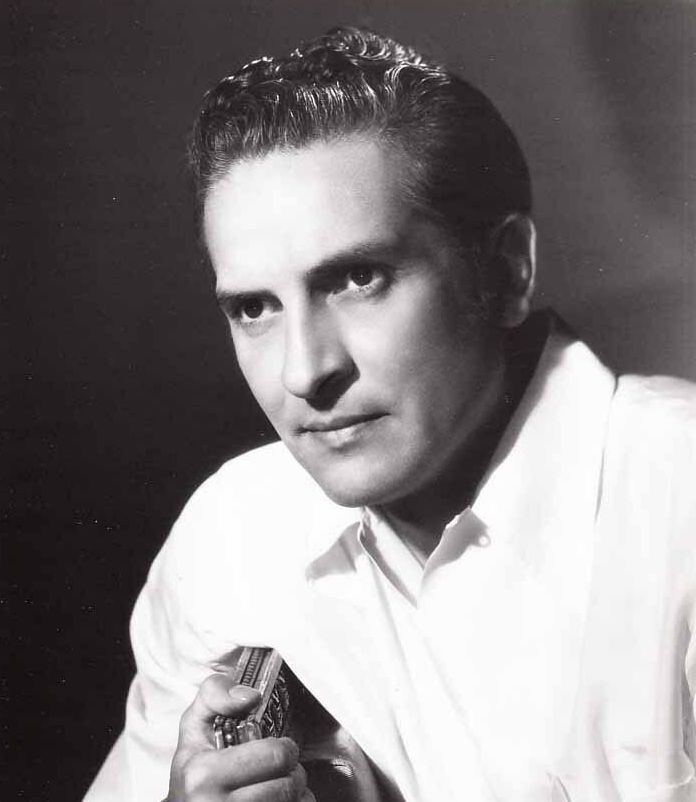
Arturo de Córdova

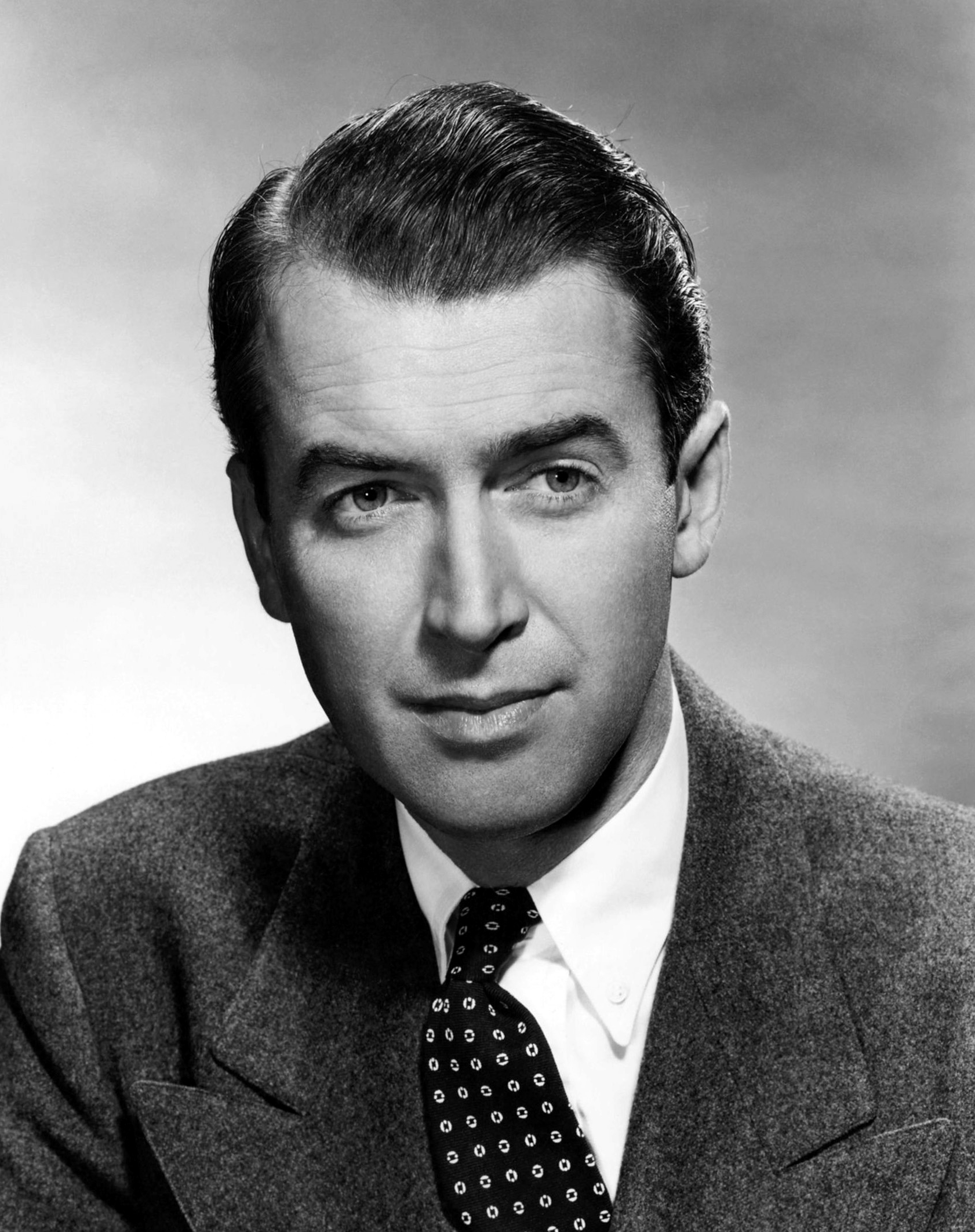
James Stewart

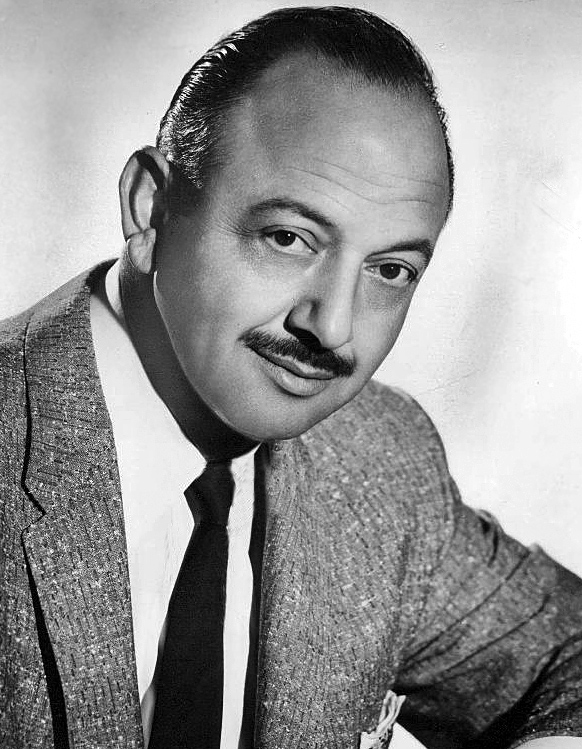
Mel Blanc

- May 1 – Krystyna Skarbek, Polish-born British World War II SOE operative (died 1952)
- May 8 – Arturo de Córdova, Mexican actor (died 1973)
- May 15 – Joe Grant, American caricaturist, character designer, concept artist, screenwriter and storyboard artist (died 2005)
- May 17 – Muhammad Ahmad Mahgoub, Sudanese author, 6th Prime Minister of Sudan (died 1976)
- May 19 – Percy Williams, Canadian athlete (died 1982)
- May 20 – James Stewart, American actor (died 1997)
- May 23
  - John Bardeen, American physicist, twice awarded the Nobel Prize (died 1991)
  - Hélène Boucher, French aviator (died 1934)
  - Tomiko Itooka, Japanese supercentenarian (died 2024)
- May 25 – Theodore Roethke, American poet (died 1963)
- May 26
  - Robert Morley, British actor (died 1992)
  - Nguyễn Ngọc Thơ, 1st Prime Minister of South Vietnam (died 1976)
- May 28 – Ian Fleming, English novelist (died 1964)
- May 30
  - Hannes Alfvén, Swedish physicist, Nobel Prize laureate (died 1995)
  - Mel Blanc, American voice actor (died 1989)
- May 31 – Don Ameche, American actor (died 1993)

=== June ===
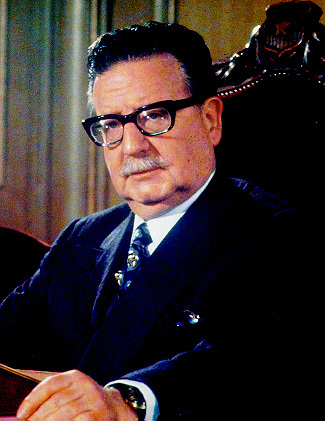
Salvador Allende

- June 4 – Geli Raubal, Austrian niece of Adolf Hitler (died 1931)
- June 8 – Inah Canabarro Lucas, Brazilian nun and supercentenarian (died 2025)
- June 11 – Francisco Marto, Portuguese saint (died 1919)
- June 21 – Yun Bong-gil, Korean resister against the Japanese occupation of Korea (died 1932)
- June 24
  - Hugo Distler, German composer (died 1942)
  - Alfons Rebane, Estonian military commander (died 1976)
- June 25 – Willard Van Orman Quine, American philosopher, academic (died 2000)
- June 26 – Salvador Allende, President of Chile (died 1973)
- June 29 – Leroy Anderson, American composer (died 1975)

=== July ===
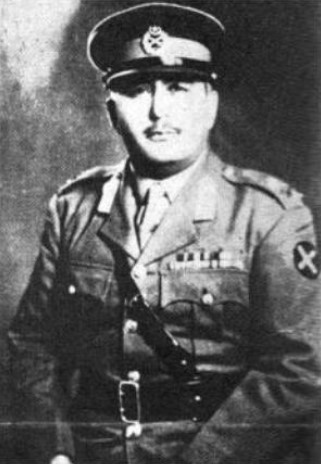
Azam Khan

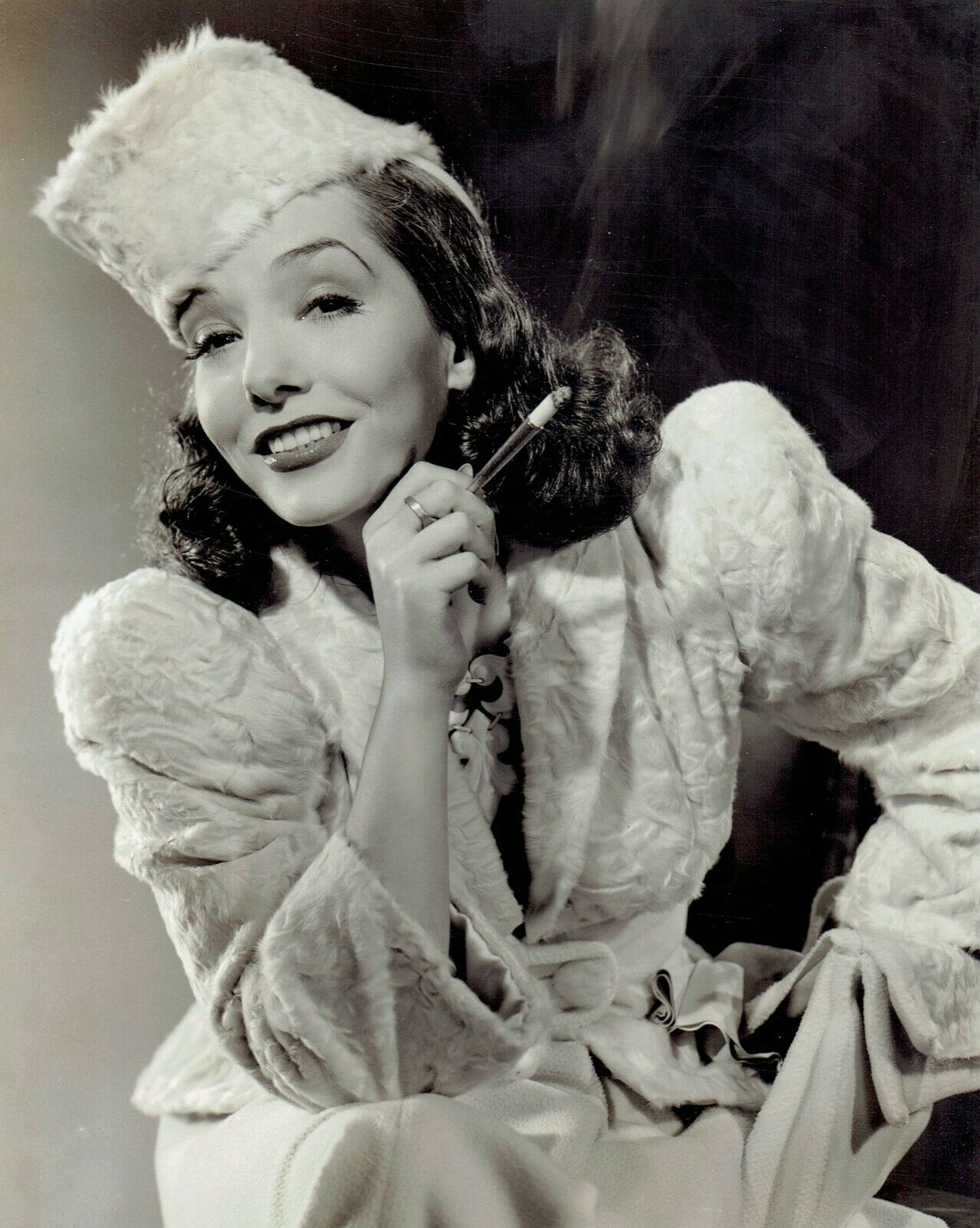
Lupe Vélez

- July 1
  - Azam Khan, Pakistani general and Governor of East Pakistan (died 1994)
  - Luis Regueiro, Spanish footballer (died 1995)
- July 2 – Thurgood Marshall, Associate Justice of the Supreme Court of the United States (died 1993)
- July 5 – Henri, Count of Paris, Orléanist claimant to the throne of France (died 1999)
- July 8 – Kaii Higashiyama, Japanese painter and writer (died 1999)
- July 12
  - Alois Hudec, Czechoslovak gymnast, Olympic champion (died 1997)
  - Milton Berle, American comedian (died 2002)
- July 13 – Garfield Todd, 5th Prime Minister of Southern Rhodesia (died 2002)
- July 17 – Mohammad Natsir, Indonesian scholar and politician; 5th Prime Minister of Indonesia (died 1993)
- July 18 – Lupe Vélez, Mexican actress, dancer and singer (died 1944)

=== August ===
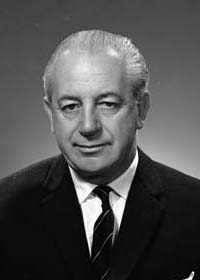
Harold Holt

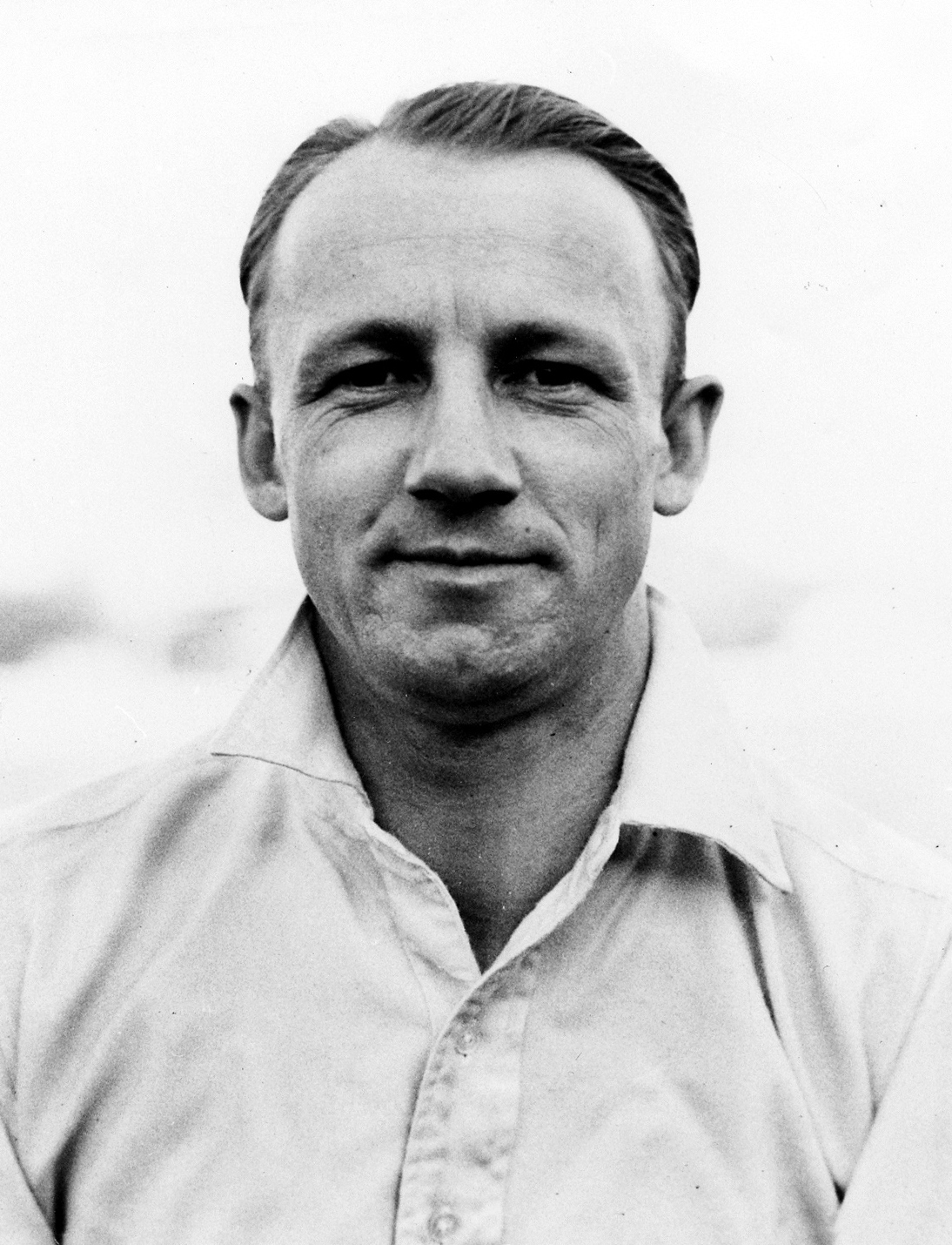
Sir Don Bradman

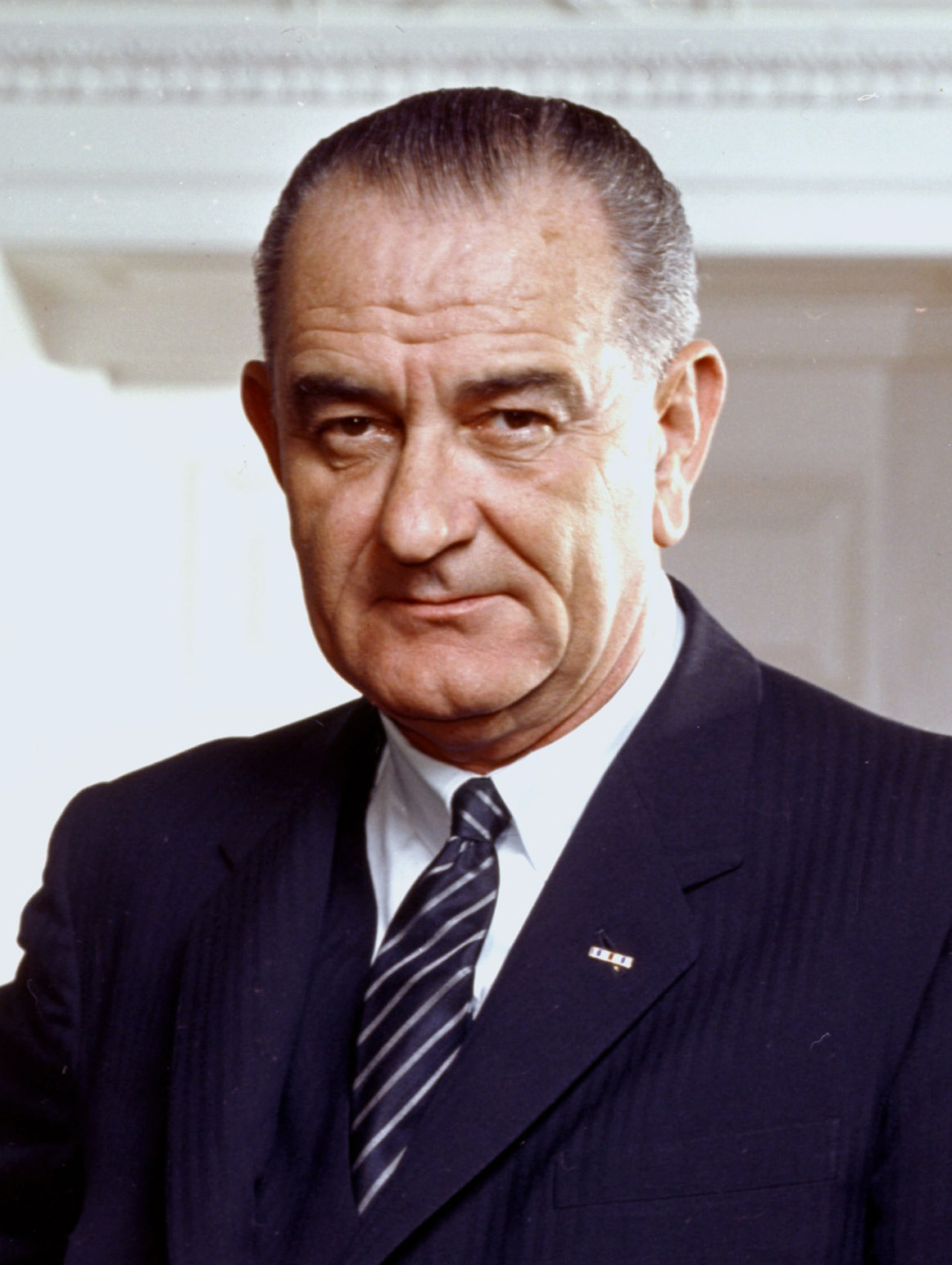
Lyndon B. Johnson

- August 5 – Harold Holt, 17th Prime Minister of Australia (died 1967)
- August 6 – Helen Jacobs, American tennis player and commander (died 1997)
- August 8
  - Arthur Goldberg, American politician, diplomat and Associate Justice of the Supreme Court of the United States (died 1990)
  - Chivu Stoica, 48th Prime Minister of Romania (died 1975)
- August 10 – Lauri Lehtinen, Finnish Olympic athlete (died 1973)
- August 13 – Gene Raymond, American actor (died 1998)
- August 18 – Edgar Faure, 2-time Prime Minister of France (died 1988)
- August 21
  - M. M. Kaye, British writer (died 2004)
  - Tom Tully, American actor (died 1982)
- August 22 – Henri Cartier-Bresson, French photographer (died 2004)
- August 27
  - Donald Bradman, Australian cricketer (died 2001)
  - Lyndon B. Johnson, 36th President of the United States (died 1973)
- August 28 – Robert Merle, French writer (died 2004)
- August 30 – Fred MacMurray, American actor (died 1991)
- August 31
  - John Ducey, Canadian baseball executive and umpire (died 1983)
  - William Saroyan, American writer (died 1981)

=== September ===
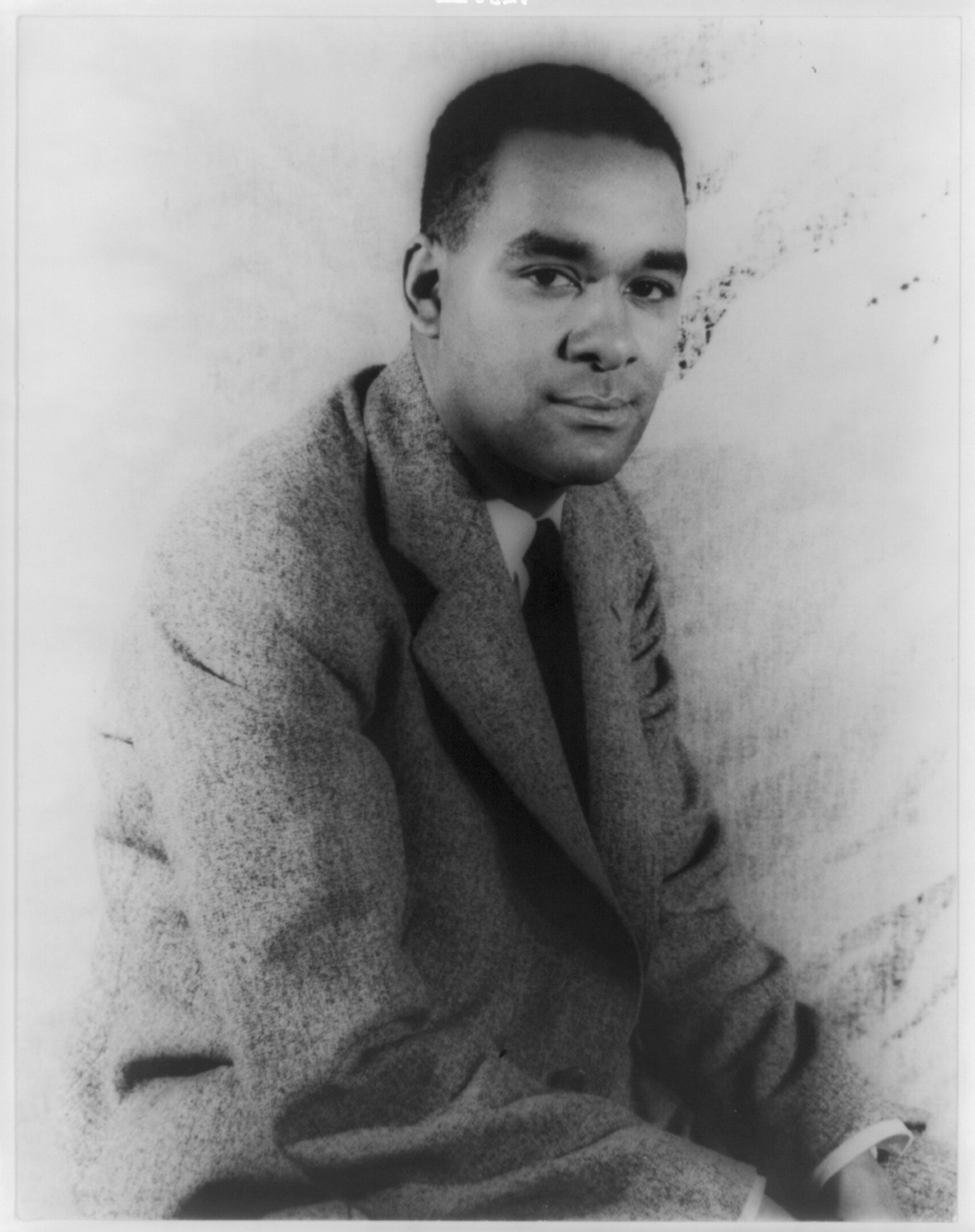
Richard Wright

- September 3 – Lev Pontryagin, Russian mathematician (died 1988)
- September 4 – Richard Wright, African-American author (died 1960)
- September 5 – Ahmed Balafrej, Moroccan politician, Foreign Minister and 2nd Prime Minister of Morocco (died 1990)
- September 7 – Michael E. DeBakey, American surgeon, medical researcher (died 2008)
- September 10 – Raymond Scott, American composer, band leader, pianist and record producer. (died 1994)
- September 13 – Mae Questel, American actress (died 1998)
- September 18 – Viktor Ambartsumian, Soviet Armenian astrophysicist (died 1996)
- September 19 – Mika Waltari, Finnish author (died 1979)
- September 21 – Charles Upham, New Zealand soldier, twice winner of the Victoria Cross (died 1994)
- September 29 – Eddie Tolan, American athlete (died 1967)
- September 30 – David Oistrakh, Ukrainian violinist (died 1974)

=== October ===
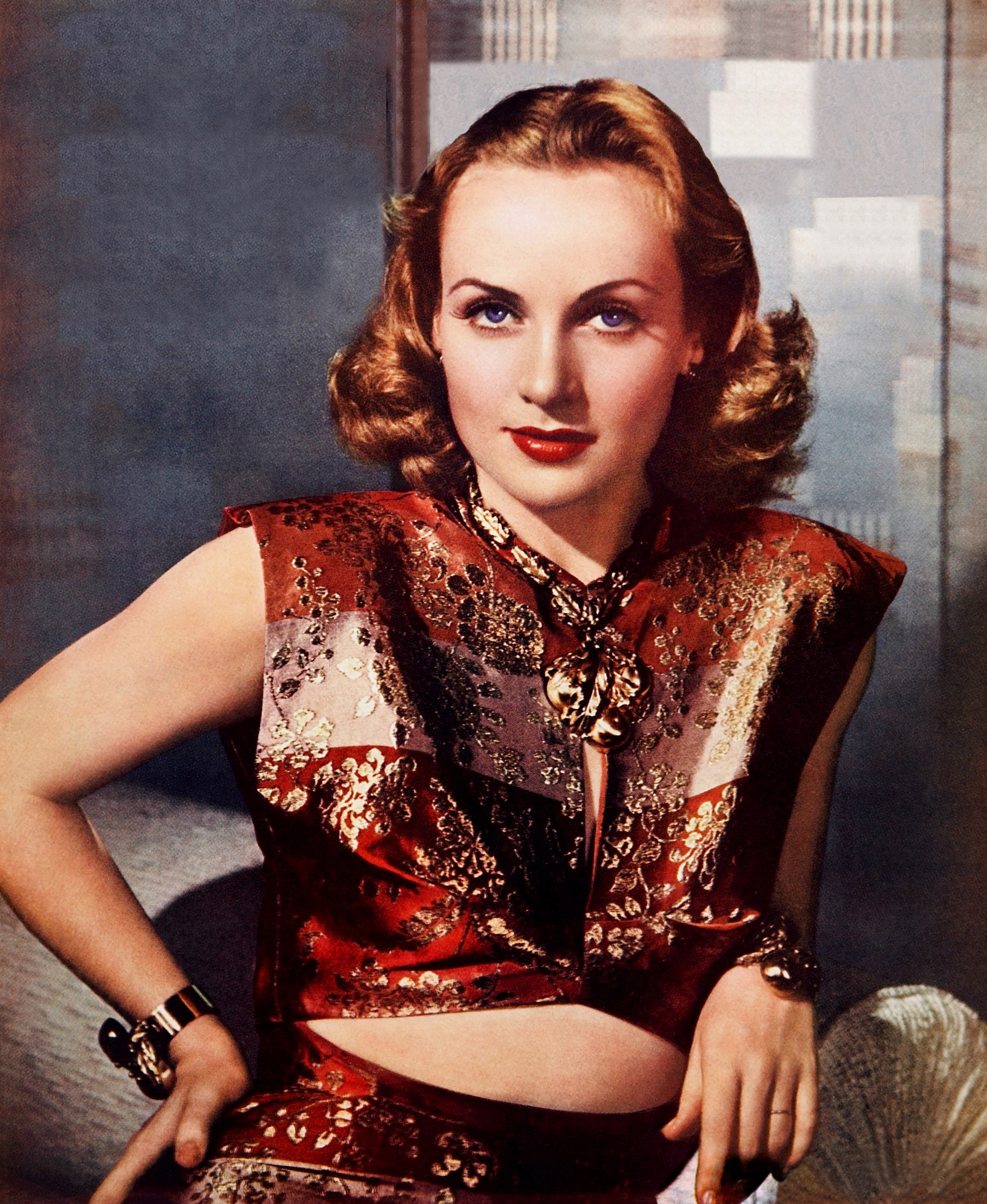
Carole Lombard

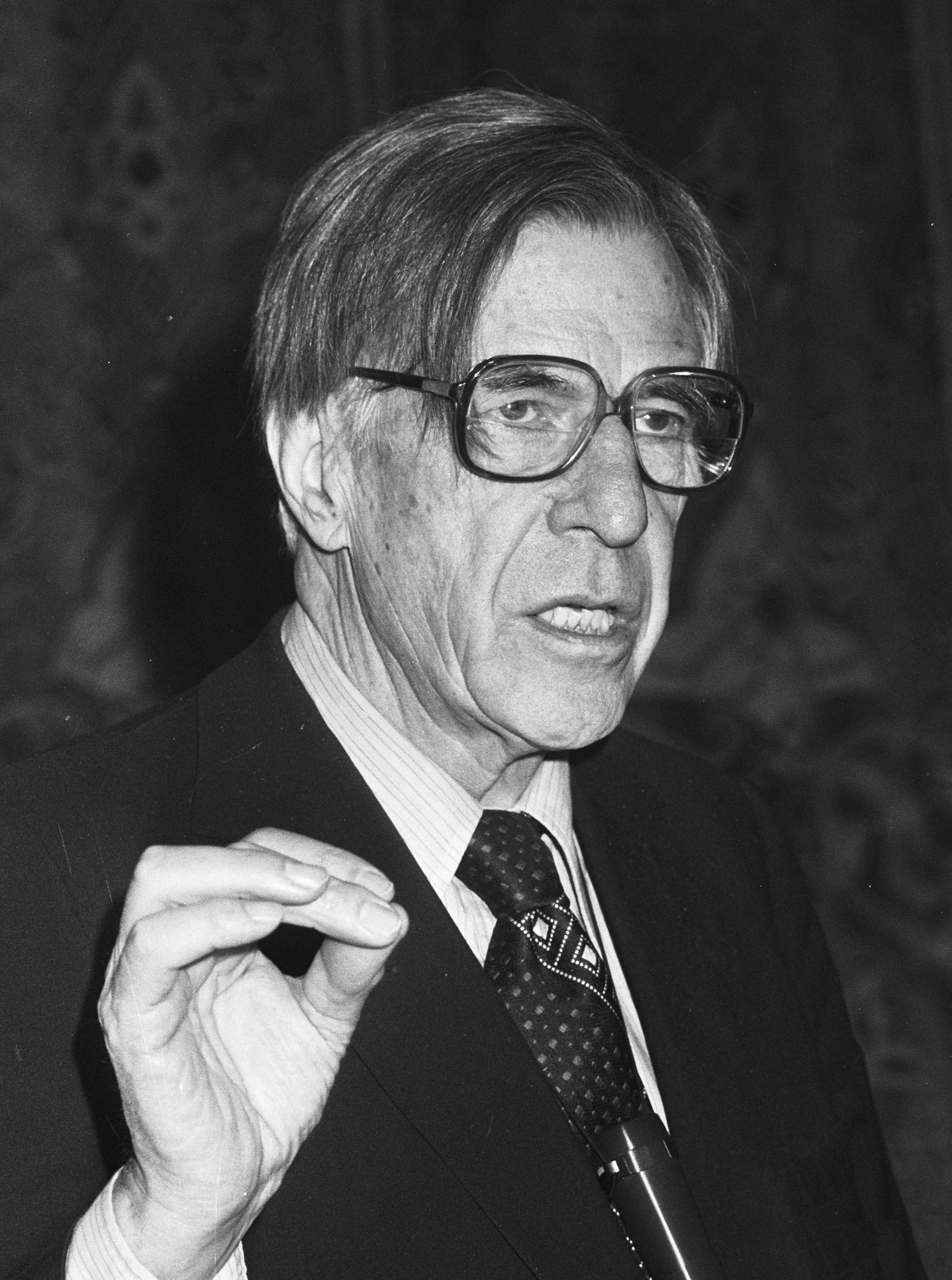
John Kenneth Galbraith

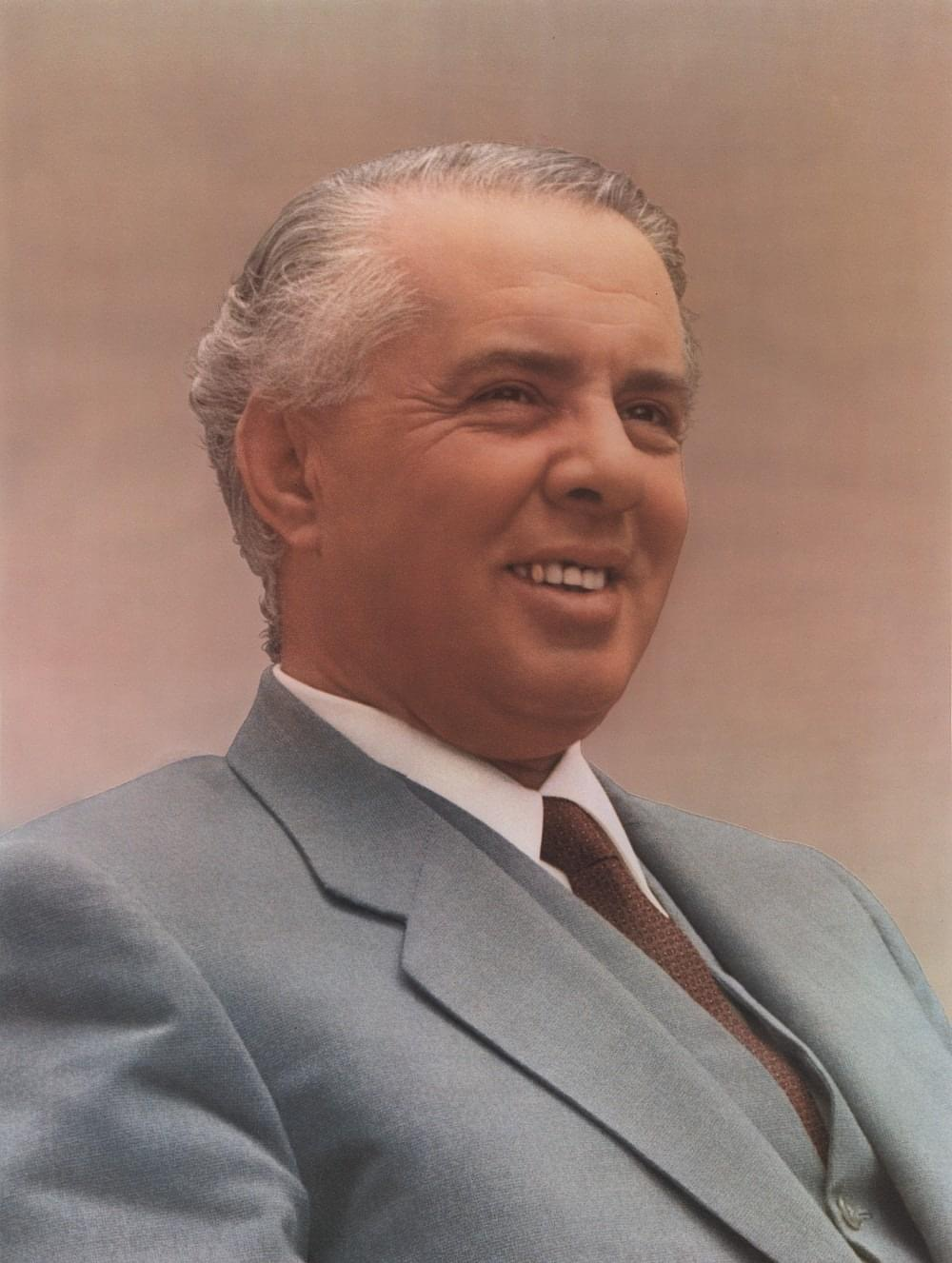
Enver Hoxha

- October 6 – Carole Lombard, American actress (d. 1942)
- October 7 – Baek Du-jin, Korean politician, 4th Prime Minister of the Republic of Korea (South Korea) (d. 1993)
- October 15 – John Kenneth Galbraith, Canadian economist (died 2006)
- October 16 – Enver Hoxha, Albanian communist dictator (d. 1985)
- October 23 – Ilya Frank, Russian physicist, Nobel Prize laureate (d. 1990)
- October 27 – Lee Krasner, American painter (d. 1984)
- October 28 – Arturo Frondizi, 35th President of Argentina (d. 1995)
- October 30 – Dmitriy Ustinov, Soviet Army officer, Minister of Defense (d. 1984)

=== November ===
- November 3 – Giovanni Leone, 68th Prime Minister of Italy, 6th President of Italy (died 2001)
- November 4 – Joseph Rotblat, Polish physicist, Nobel Peace Prize laureate (died 2005)
- November 14 – Joseph McCarthy, American politician (died 1957)
- November 16 – Emmanuelle Cinquin, French religious sister (died 2008)
- November 18 – Imogene Coca, American actress (died 2001)
- November 20 – Alistair Cooke, English-born American journalist (died 2004)
- November 28 – Claude Lévi-Strauss, Belgian-born French anthropologist (died 2009)

=== December ===
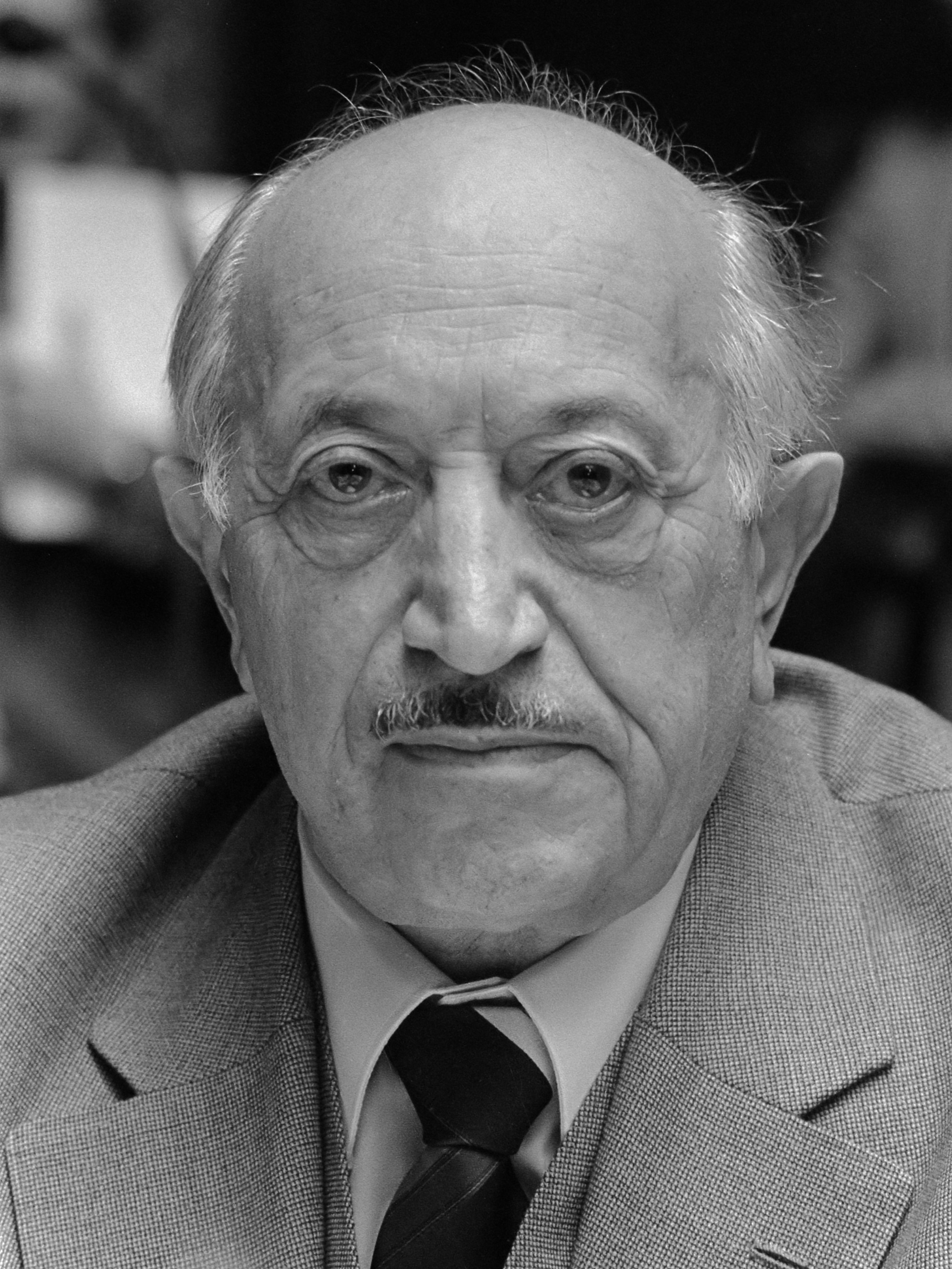
Simon Wiesenthal

- December 4 – Alfred Hershey, American bacteriologist, Nobel Prize laureate (died 1997)
- December 6 – Baby Face Nelson, American gangster (died 1934)
- December 9 – Aden Adde, 1st president of Somalia (died 2007)
- December 10 – Olivier Messiaen, French composer (died 1992)
- December 11
  - Carlos Arias Navarro, Spanish politician, President of Spain (died 1989)
  - Elliott Carter, American composer (died 2012)
  - Manoel de Oliveira, Portuguese film director and screenwriter (died 2015)
  - Hákun Djurhuus, 4th Prime Minister of the Faroe Islands (died 1987)
  - Alfred Proksch, Austrian Olympic athlete (died 2011)
- December 14
  - Doria Shafik, Egyptian feminist, poet, writer and editor (d. 1975)
  - Laurence Naismith, English actor (died 1992)
- December 16 – Hans Schaffner, 69th President of Switzerland (died 2004)
- December 17 – Willard Libby, American chemist, Nobel Prize laureate (died 1980)
- December 19 – Yvette Cauchois, French physicist (d. 1999)
- December 25 – Quentin Crisp, British actor (died 1999)
- December 28 – Lew Ayres, American actor (died 1996)
- December 31 – Simon Wiesenthal, Austrian Nazi-hunter (died 2005)

=== Date unknown ===
- Takieddin el-Solh, 2-Time Prime Minister of Lebanon (died 1988)
- Suleiman Nabulsi, 12th Prime Minister of Jordan (died 1976)

== Deaths ==
=== January–March ===
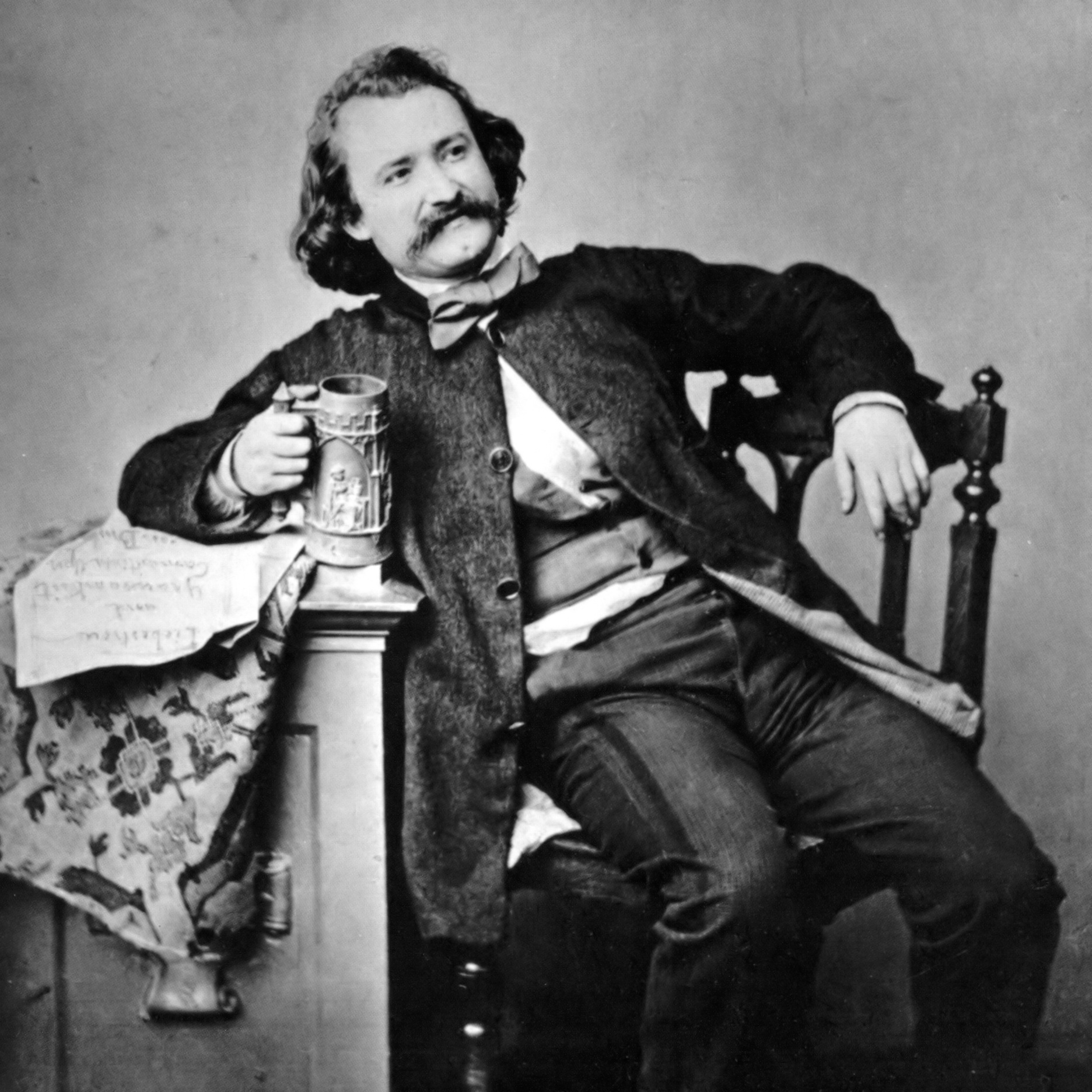
Wilhelm Busch

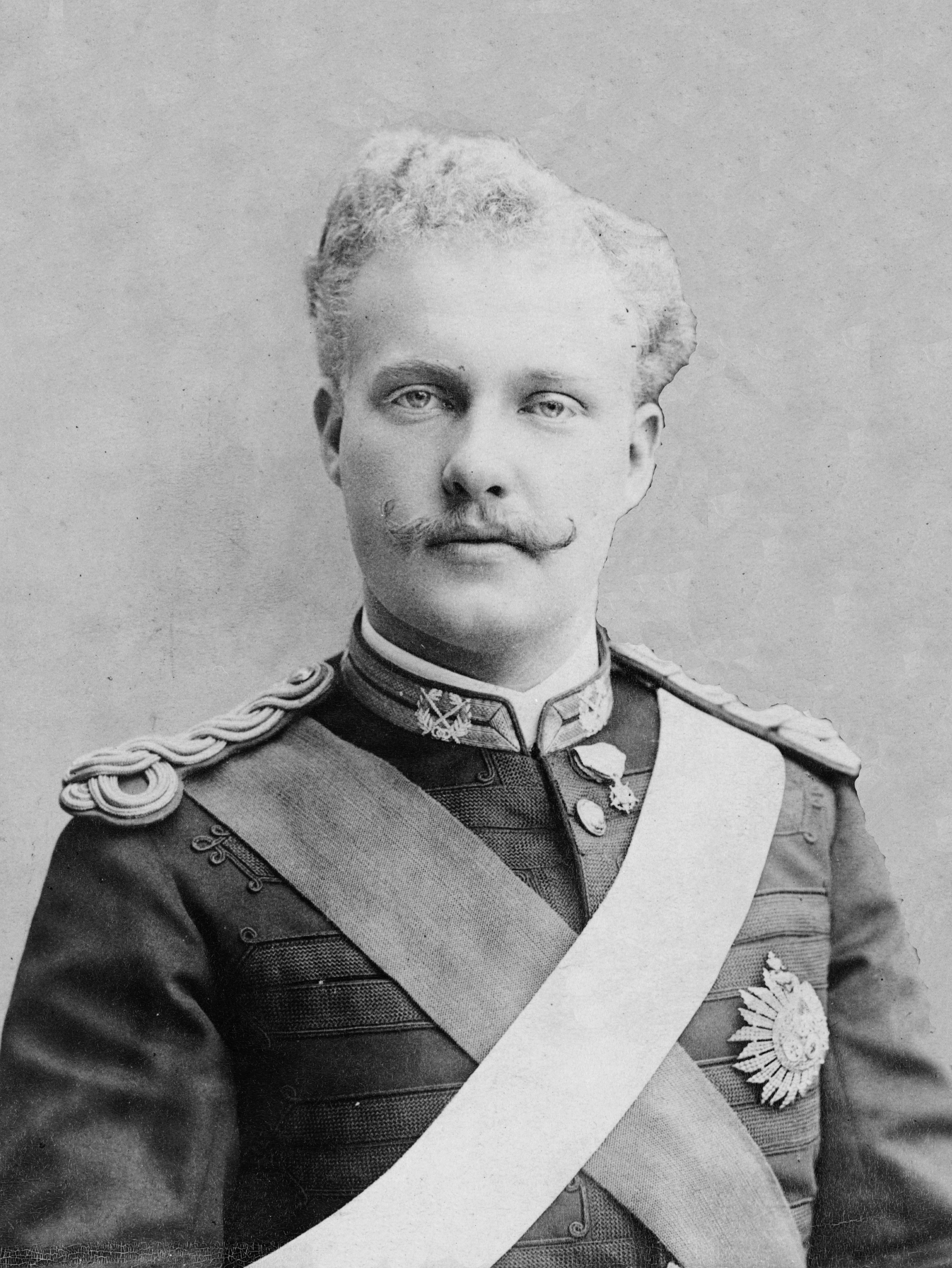
Carlos I of Portugal

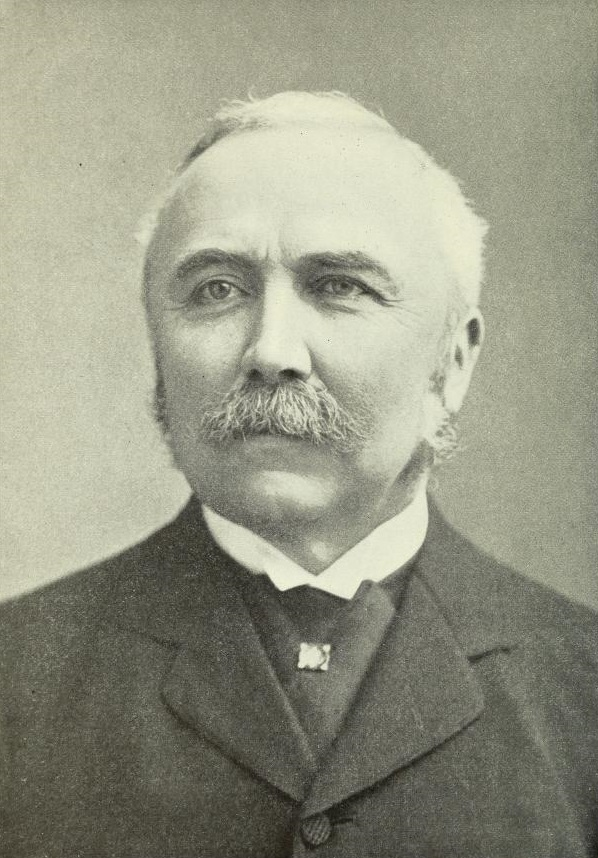
Henry Campbell-Bannerman

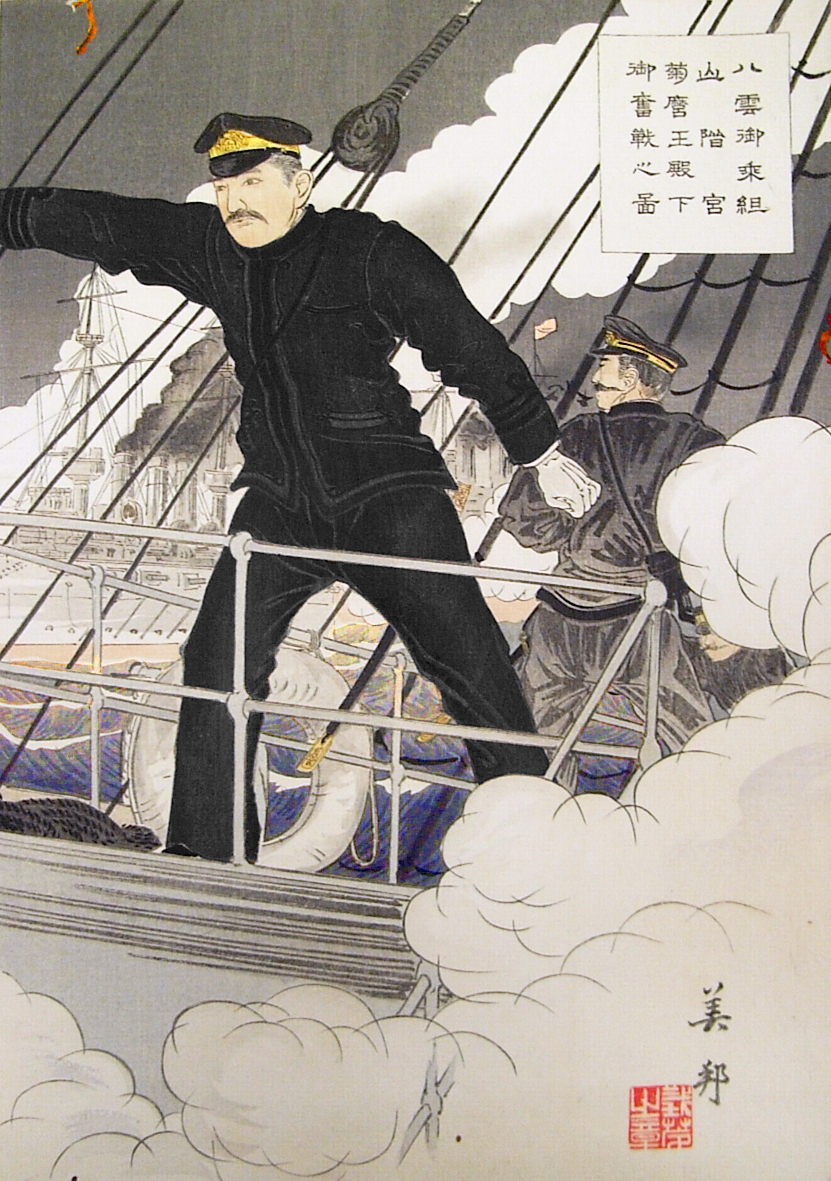
Prince Yamashina Kikumaro

Grover Cleveland

- January 9 – Wilhelm Busch, German painter, poet (born 1832)
- January 14 – Holger Drachmann, Danish poet (born 1846)
- January 17 – Ferdinand IV, Grand Duke of Tuscany (born 1835)
- January 20 – William Wood, American ventriloquist (born c. 1861)
- January 23 – Edward MacDowell, American composer (born 1860)
- January 25 – Ouida, English writer (born 1839)
- February 1
  - King Carlos I of Portugal (born 1863)
  - Luís Filipe, Prince Royal of Portugal (born 1887)
- February 17
  - Annie Ryder Gracey, American missionary (born 1836)
  - Baron Ignaz von Plener, 3rd Minister-President of Cisleithania (born 1810)
- February 22 – Eliza A. Pittsinger, "The California Poetess" (born 1837)
- February 29
  - John Hope, 1st Marquess of Linlithgow, 1st Governor-General of Australia (born 1860)
  - Pat Garrett, Sheriff in the Old West; shot Billy the Kid in 1881 (born 1850)
- March 3 – Sidney Hill, English philanthropist (born 1829)
- March 11 – Edmondo De Amicis, Italian novelist (born 1846)
- March 27 – Charles N. Sims, American Methodist preacher, third chancellor of Syracuse University (born 1835)
- March 29 – Esther Pugh, American temperance reformer (born 1834)
- March 30 – Chester Gillette, American murderer (executed) (born 1883)

=== April–June ===
- April 20 – Henry Chadwick, English-born American baseball writer (born 1824)
- April 22
  - Qasim Amin, Egyptian writer (born 1863)
  - Sir Henry Campbell-Bannerman, Prime Minister of the United Kingdom (born 1836)
- April 26 – Karl Möbius, German ecologist (born 1825)
- May 2 – Prince Yamashina Kikumaro, Japanese prince (born 1873)
- May 17 – Carl Koldewey, German explorer (born 1837)
- May 23 – François Coppée, French poet, playwright and novelist (born 1842)
- May 24 – Old Tom Morris, Scottish golfer (born 1821)
- May 26 – Mirza Ghulam Ahmad, Sikh Empire-born founder of the Ahmadiyya movement in Islam (born 1835)
- June 2 – Sir Redvers Buller, British general, Victoria Cross recipient (born 1839)
- June 5 – Jef Lambeaux, Belgian sculptor (born 1852)
- June 9 – Drusilla Wilson, American temperance leader and Quaker pastor (born 1815)
- June 14 – Frederick Stanley, 16th Earl of Derby, Governor-General of Canada, founder of the Stanley Cup (born 1841)
- June 20
  - Federico Chueca, Spanish composer (born 1846)
  - Eleanor Kirk, American publisher (born 1831)
- June 21 – Nikolai Rimsky-Korsakov, Russian composer (born 1844)
- June 24 – Grover Cleveland, 22nd and 24th President of the United States (born 1837)

=== July–September ===
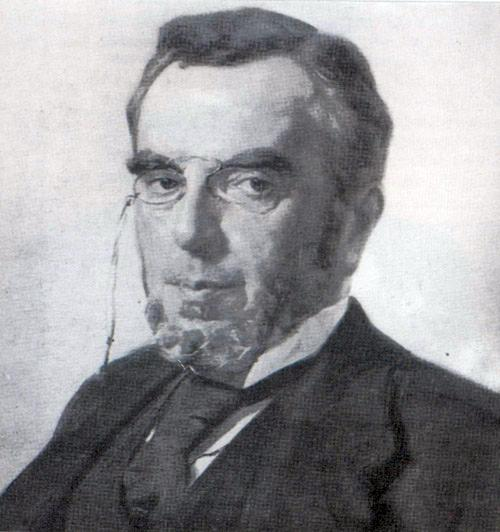
Demetrius Vikelas

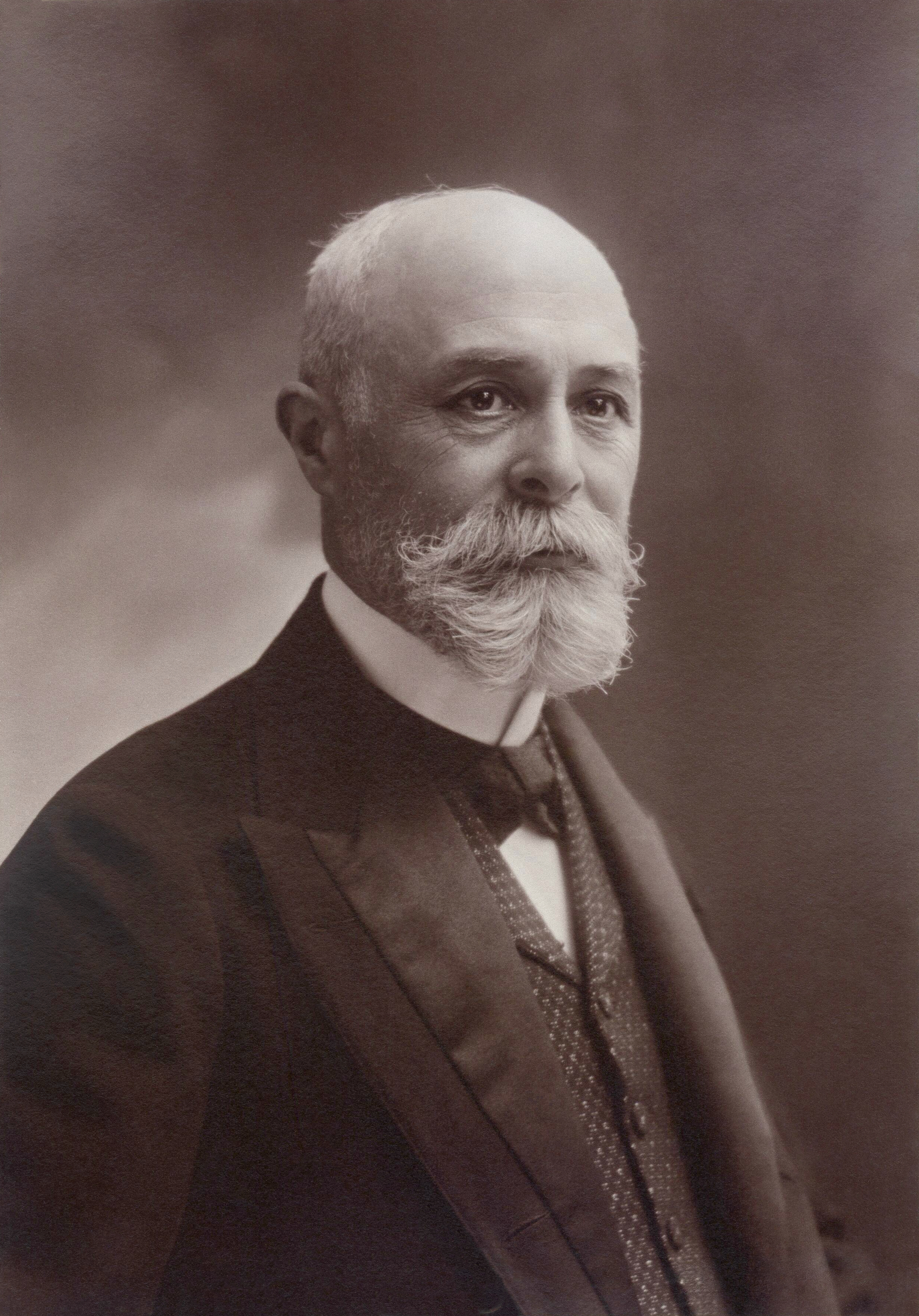
Henri Becquerel

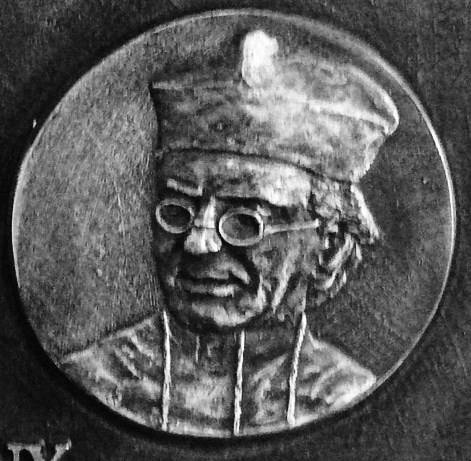
Servant of God John Berthier

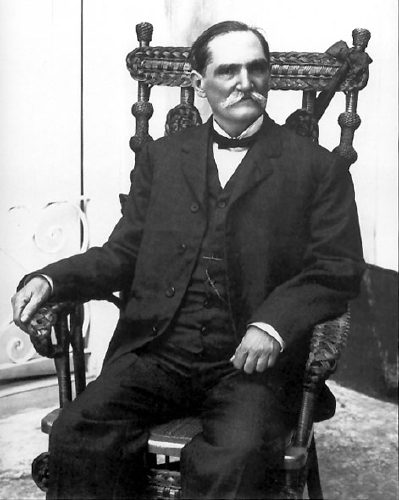
Tomás Estrada Palma

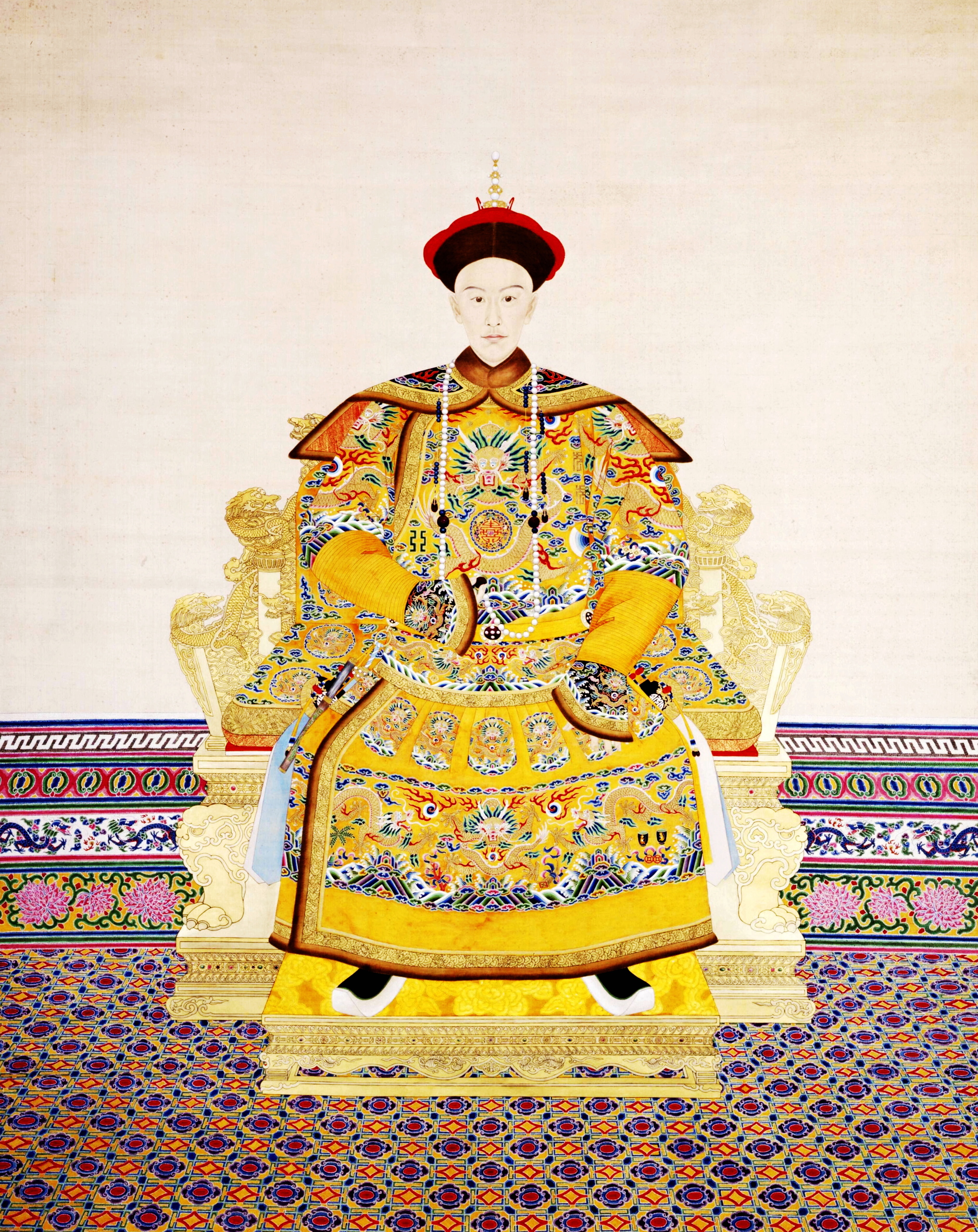
Emperor Guangxu of China

- July 3 – Joel Chandler Harris, American author (born 1848)
- July 5 – Jonas Lie, Norwegian writer (born 1833)
- July 6 – Felipe Calderón y Roca, Filipino politician (born 1868)
- July 12 – William D. Coleman, 13th President of Liberia (born 1842)
- July 12 - Robert Potter, author and minister (born 1831)
- July 19 – Ignacio de Veintemilla, 11th President of Ecuador (born 1828)
- July 20 – Demetrius Vikelas, 1st President of the International Olympic Committee (born 1835)
- July 22 – Sir Randal Cremer, English politician and pacifist, Nobel Prize laureate (born 1828)
- July 24 – Sigismondo Savona, Maltese educator and politician (born 1835)
- August 4 – Radoje Domanović, Serbian writer (born 1873)
- August 7 – Antonio Starabba, Marchese di Rudinì, 12th Prime Minister of Italy (born 1839)
- August 24 – Éleuthère Mascart, French physicist (born 1837)
- August 25 – Henri Becquerel, French physicist, Nobel Prize laureate (born 1852)
- August 26 – Tony Pastor, American theater impresario (born 1837)
- August 31 – Leslie Green, British architect (born 1875)
- September 17 – Thomas Selfridge, United States Army officer, first person killed in an airplane crash (born 1882)
- September 20 – Pablo de Sarasate, Spanish violinist, composer (born 1844)
- September 21
  - Ernest Fenollosa, Spanish-born American art historian and philosopher (born 1853)
  - Sir Arnold Kemball, British army officer and diplomat (born 1820)
  - Nicolás Salmerón y Alonso, 3rd President of Spain (born 1838)
- September 25 – Frank Robison, American baseball executive, early owner of the St. Louis Cardinals (born 1852)
- September 29 – Machado de Assis, Brazilian author (born 1839)

=== October–December ===
- October 11 – Rita Cetina Gutiérrez, Mexican educator, poet and activist (born 1846)
- October 16 – John Berthier, French Roman Catholic priest, missionary and servant of God (born 1840)
- October 18 – Nozu Michitsura, Japanese general (born 1840)
- October 26 – Enomoto Takeaki, Japanese samurai, admiral (born 1836)
- October 30 – Caroline Schermerhorn Astor, American socialite (born 1830)
- October – Gus Rogers, American vaudevillian (born 1869)
- November 1 – Mary F. Eastman, American educator, lecturer, writer and suffragist (born 1833)
- November 4
  - Richard Gerstl, Austrian artist (born 1883)
  - Tomás Estrada Palma, 1st President of Cuba (born 1832)
- November 7
  - Butch Cassidy, American outlaw (born 1866)
  - Sundance Kid, American outlaw (born 1867)
- November 8
  - Josephine E. Keating, American literary critic and musician (born 1838)
  - Victorien Sardou, French dramatist (born 1831)
- November 14 – Emperor Guangxu of China (born 1871)
- November 15 – Empress Dowager Cixi of China (born 1835)
- November 17 – Lydia Thompson, English dancer, actress (born 1838)
- November 22 – Paul Taffanel, French flautist, composer (born 1844)
- December 13 – Augustus Le Plongeon, American archaeologist (born 1825)
- December 22 – Jacob Parrott, the first person to receive the American Medal of Honor, one of six presented on March 25, 1863, to the heroes of the Great Locomotive Chase during the American Civil War (born 1843)

=== Date unknown ===
- Jacob W. Davis, Latvian American tailor, inventor of jeans (born 1831)

== Nobel Prizes ==

- Physics – Gabriel Lippmann
- Chemistry – Ernest Rutherford
- Medicine – Élie Metchnikoff, Paul Ehrlich
- Literature – Rudolf Christoph Eucken
- Peace – Klas Pontus Arnoldson, Fredrik Bajer
