= Fétigny =

Fétigny may refer to:

- Fétigny, Jura, a commune in the region of Franche-Comté, France
- Fétigny, Switzerland, a municipality in the canton of Fribourg, Switzerland
