= Angola–Liechtenstein relations =

Angolan–Liechtensteiner relations

- Angola: Liechtenstein

Foreign relations between Angola and its predecessors with Liechtenstein date back to missionary missions from 1946. Both countries established formal diplomatic relations on 23 June 2021. Since then, relations between the two countries have been stable.

Angola does not have an embassy in Liechtenstein, but the Angolan ambassador to Switzerland, located in Bern, is also accredited to Liechtenstein. Similarly, the Swiss embassy in Luanda also represents Liechtenstein.

== History ==
Between 1940 and 1960, five Liechtensteiners joined the Missionaries of La Salette. Starting from 1946, three of which spent several decades as missionaries in Angola, then under Portuguese rule, as part of wider work by the congregation in the country. The primary source of funds for the missionaries were private donations by the Liechtenstein population and parishes until 1965 when the Liechtenstein Development Service was founded and began state-funding the missionaries.

During the Angolan Civil War, the mission was heavily disrupted, but remains active. Liechtenstein volunteers in Angola also provide vocational education and assistance in construction.
