= John Berthier =

French priest and missionary (1840–1908)

Venerable Jean-Baptiste Berthier M.S.

Priest
- Born: 24 February 1840; Châtonnay, Isère, Kingdom of France
- Died: 16 October 1908 (aged 68); Grave, Noord-Brabant, Netherlands
- Venerated in: Roman Catholic Church
- Attributes: Priest's cassock
- Patronage: Missionaries of the Holy Family

John Baptiste Berthier (February 24, 1840 – October 16, 1908) was a Catholic missionary and educator. He founded a Catholic religious institute, the Congregation of the Missionaries of the Holy Family (formerly the Institute for Late Vocations) in Grave, the Netherlands in 1895 - organized to meet the needs of men who desired to become priests later in their life.

== Life ==
Berthier was born February 24, 1840, in Chatonnay in southern France. On October 23, 1858, at the age of 18, he entered the seminary in Grenoble. In July 1862, he joined the Missionaries of La Salette. He was ordained a priest in September 1862. Berthier was first assigned to the Minor Seminary of Saint Joseph in Corps.

The organization received episcopal approval in 1904, and took the name Missionaries of the Holy Family. Berthier died October 16, 1908. Berthier was the author of 36 ascetical and theological works, largely relating to the diversity of ways to holiness through imitating the holy family.

The group expanded into Germany, Switzerland, Belgium, and Brazil by 1910. As of 2014 there were Holy Family priests and brothers serving in 22 countries around the world. its members cultivate a special devotion to Our Lady, Reconciler of Sinners, retaining thus a spiritual kinship with the Missionaries of La Salette, of which Berthier was a member.

The cause for beatification for John Berthier has been opened. On May 2018, Pope Francis authorized the promulgation of a decree recognizing his heroic virtues. Fr. Berthier was subsequently given the title Venerable. His cause for beatification remains in progress.

== Bibliography ==
- Thoughts of Father Berthier: A Treasure with Old and New Things, by Father Berthier - Congregazione dei Missionari della Sacra Famiglia, Editions du Signe, (c) 2011, ISBN 978-2-7468-2673-1, www.editionsdusigne.fr.
- Les merveilles de la Salette. Téqui, 1898.
