= Fétigny, Jura =

Fétigny
- Part of Valzin en Petite Montagne
- Coat of arms
- Location of Fétigny
- Location within France Location within Bourgogne-Franche-Comté
- Coordinates: 46°26′34″N 5°36′02″E
- Country: France
- Region: Bourgogne-Franche-Comté
- Department: Jura
- Arrondissement: Lons-le-Saunier
- Canton: Moirans-en-Montagne
- Commune: Valzin en Petite Montagne
- Area^{1}: 3.30 km^{2} (1.27 sq mi)
- Highest elevation: 731 m (2,398 ft)
- Lowest elevation: 390 m (1,280 ft)
- Population (2014): 85
  - Density: 26/km^{2} (67/sq mi)
- Time zone: UTC+01:00 (CET)
  - Summer (DST): UTC+02:00 (CEST)
- Postal code: 39240
- ^{1} French Land Register data, which excludes lakes, ponds, glaciers > 1 km^{2} (0.386 sq mi or 247 acres) and river estuaries.

Fétigny (French pronunciation: [fetiɲi]) is a former commune in the Jura department in Bourgogne-Franche-Comté in eastern France. On 1 January 2017, it was merged into the new commune Valzin en Petite Montagne.

== See also ==
- Communes of the Jura department
