= Valzin en Petite Montagne =

- Commune
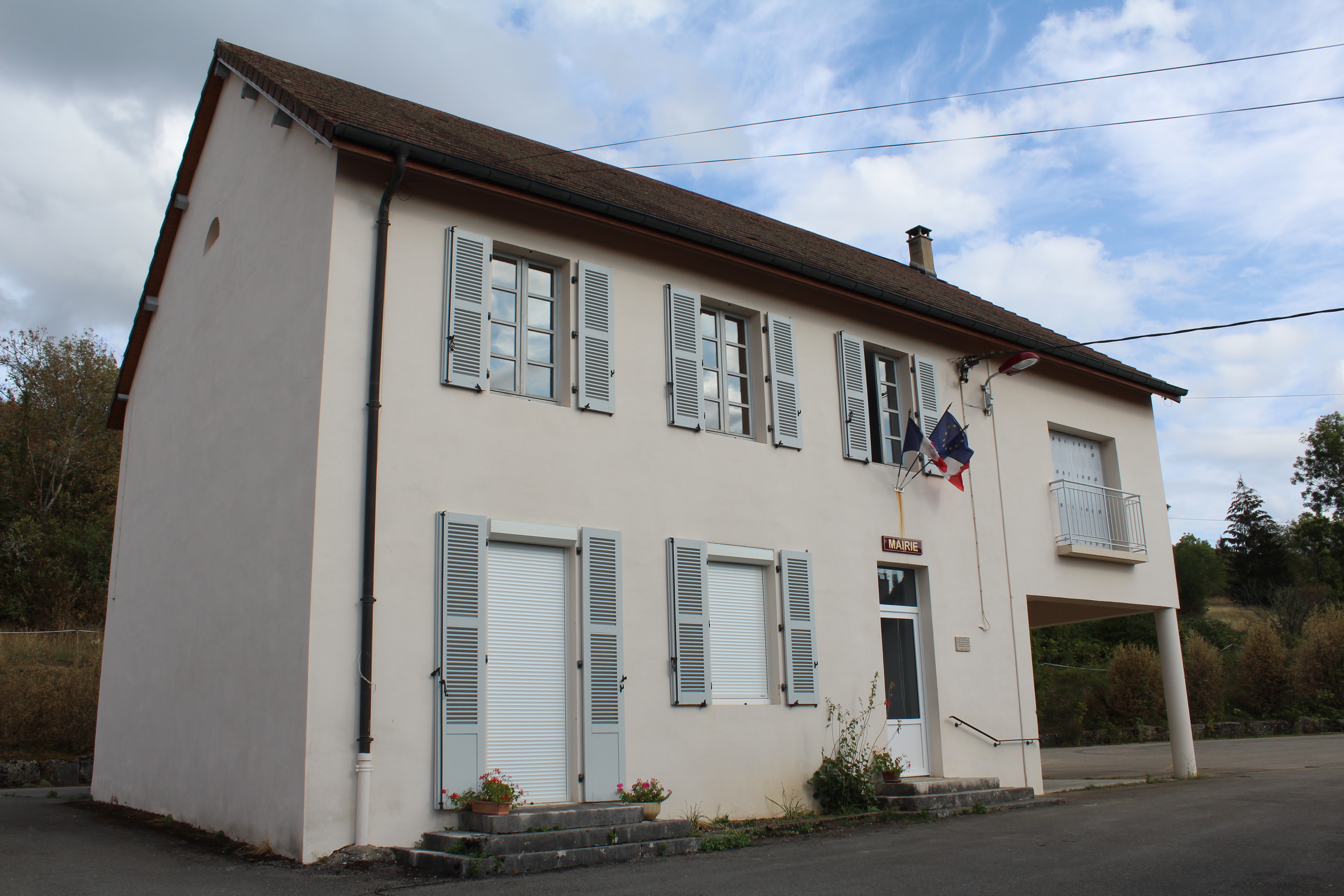
- The town hall in Valzin en Petite Montagne
- Location of Valzin en Petite Montagne
- Location within France Location within Bourgogne-Franche-Comté
- Coordinates: 46°25′41″N 5°35′42″E
- Country: France
- Region: Bourgogne-Franche-Comté
- Department: Jura
- Arrondissement: Lons-le-Saunier
- Canton: Moirans-en-Montagne
- Area^{1}: 26.38 km^{2} (10.19 sq mi)
- Population (2023): 445
  - Density: 16.9/km^{2} (43.7/sq mi)
- Time zone: UTC+01:00 (CET)
  - Summer (DST): UTC+02:00 (CEST)
- INSEE/Postal code: 39290 /39240
- ^{1} French Land Register data, which excludes lakes, ponds, glaciers > 1 km^{2} (0.386 sq mi or 247 acres) and river estuaries.

Valzin en Petite Montagne is a commune in the department of Jura, eastern France. The municipality was established on 1 January 2017 by merger of the former communes of Légna (the seat), Chatonnay, Fétigny and Savigna.

== See also ==
- Communes of the Jura department
