= Chatonnay =

- Part of Valzin en Petite Montagne
- Location of Chatonnay
- Location within France Location within Bourgogne-Franche-Comté
- Coordinates: 46°25′32″N 5°32′42″E
- Country: France
- Region: Bourgogne-Franche-Comté
- Department: Jura
- Arrondissement: Lons-le-Saunier
- Canton: Moirans-en-Montagne
- Commune: Valzin en Petite Montagne
- Area^{1}: 2.82 km^{2} (1.09 sq mi)
- Highest elevation: 440 m (1,440 ft)
- Lowest elevation: 345 m (1,132 ft)
- Population (2014): 65
  - Density: 23/km^{2} (60/sq mi)
- Time zone: UTC+01:00 (CET)
  - Summer (DST): UTC+02:00 (CEST)
- Postal code: 39240
- ^{1} French Land Register data, which excludes lakes, ponds, glaciers > 1 km^{2} (0.386 sq mi or 247 acres) and river estuaries.

Chatonnay (French pronunciation: [ʃatɔnɛ]) is a former commune in the Jura department in Bourgogne-Franche-Comté in eastern France. On 1 January 2017, it was merged into the new commune Valzin en Petite Montagne.

== See also ==
- Communes of the Jura department
