= Clemente Castor =

Mexican director and screenwriter

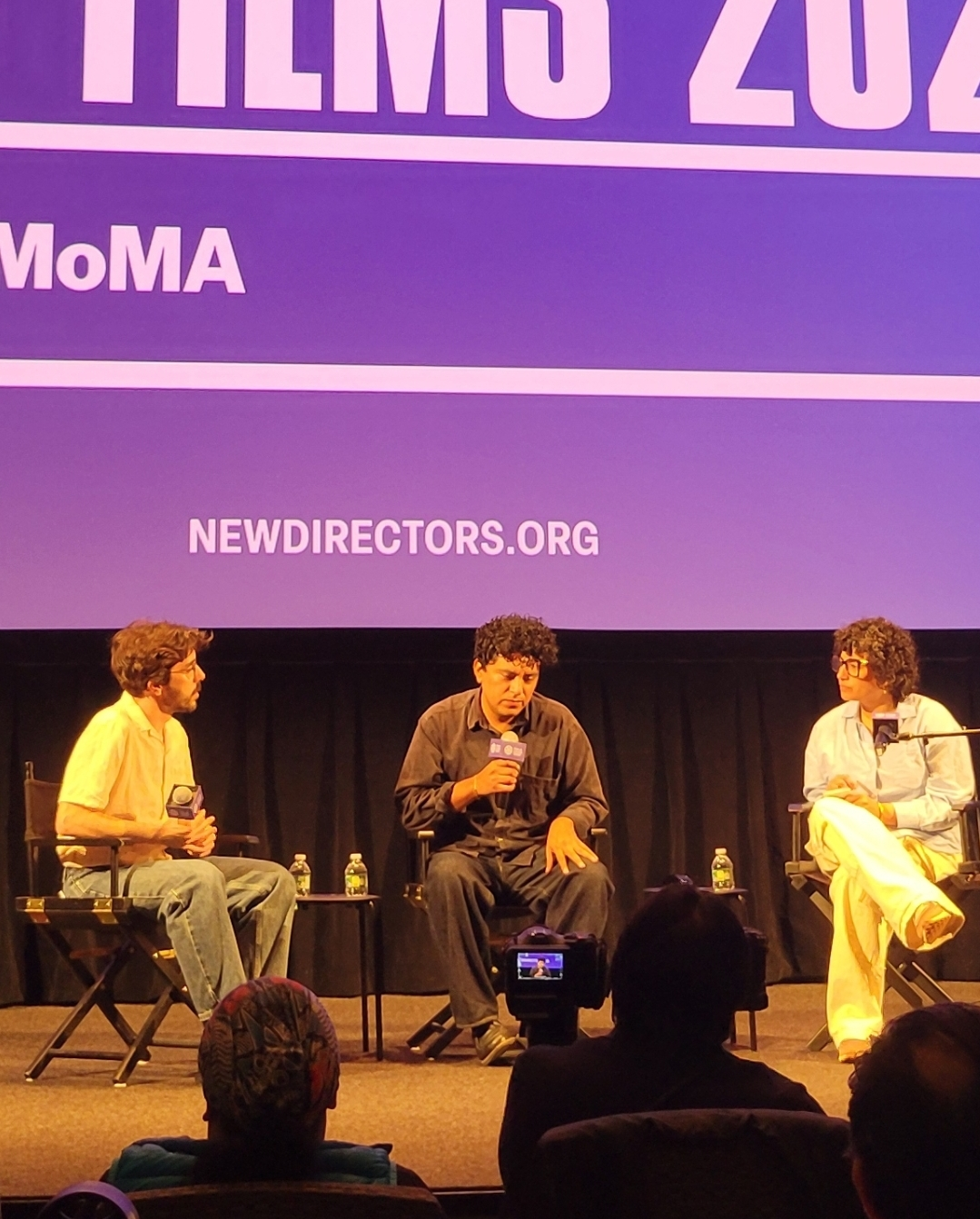
- Castor (middle) at 2026 New Directors/New Films Festival
- Born: Mexico
- Education: Sarajevo Film Academy
- Occupations: Film director, screenwriter, producer, artist

Clemente Castor is a Mexican director, screenwriter, producer, and visual artist.

== Education ==
He received a grant from UNESCO's National Fund for Culture and the Arts (FONCA) to study at the Sarajevo Film Academy's Béla Tarr film.factory in Bosnia and Herzegovina.

== Career ==
Castor directed a number of shorts before releasing his first feature film, Príncipe de Paz (Prince of Peace), in 2019, which won Best Mexican Movie at the 2019 edition of the Film Festival of the National Autonomous University of México (FICUNAM). His second feature, Frío Metal (Cold Metal), was released in 2025 and won the Prix Georges de Beauregard at FIDMarseille 2025. It had its US premiere at the 2026 New Directors/New Films Festival in New York City.

== Other work ==
Castor is also the co-founder of the company Salón de Belleza, which produces and distributes numerous Spanish language films in Mexico, including Albert Serra's Afternoons of Solitude. He has had his installation work exhibited in several contemporary art museums, including Biquini Wax EPS, Querétaro Contemporary Art Museum, and SOMA.

== Filmography ==
=== Film ===
Year	Title	Director	Writer	Producer	Notes
2016	Silencio: Silere	Yes	Yes	Yes	Short film
2017	Resplandece	Yes	Yes	Yes	Short film
2019	Príncipe de paz	Yes	Yes	Yes	Feature film
2020	Fantasma, animal	Yes	Yes	Yes	Short film
2022	Atados los años engullen la tierra	Yes	Yes	No	Short film
2025	Frío Metal	Yes	Yes	Yes	Feature film
