= Bullfighting =

Physical contest involving a matador and a bull

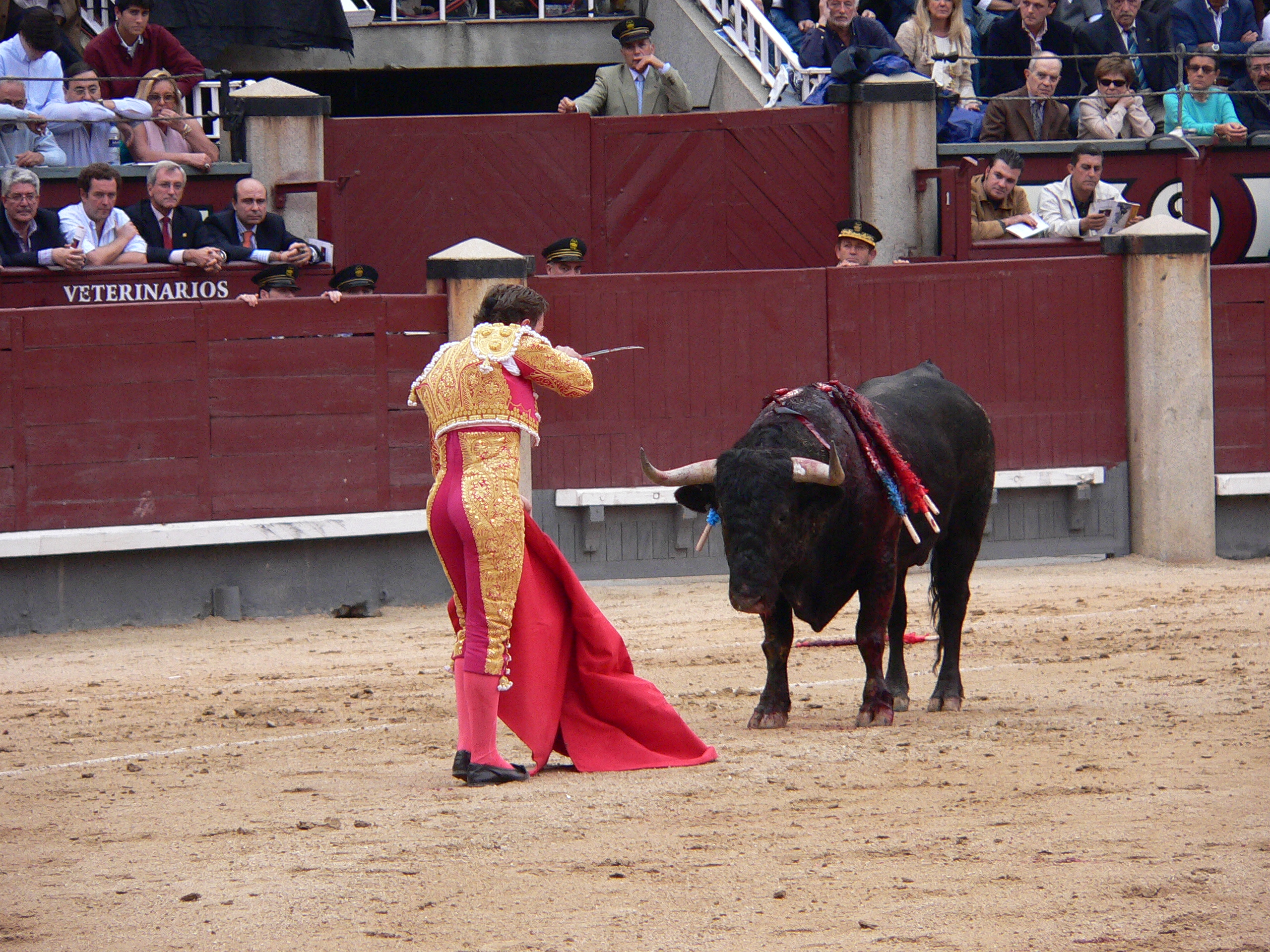
Spanish bullfight in Las Ventas in Madrid

Bullfighting is a physical contest that involves a bullfighter attempting to subdue, immobilize, or kill a bull, usually according to a set of rules, guidelines, or cultural expectations. Bullfighting can also loosely refer to other spectacles in which two bulls are pitted against each other, that is, bull wrestling.

There are several variations, including some forms which involve dancing around or leaping over a cow or bull or attempting to grasp an object tied to the animal's horns. The best-known form of bullfighting is Spanish-style bullfighting, practiced in Spain, and a few of its former American colonies, as well as parts of the Philippines, Portugal (see: Portuguese-style bullfighting) and Southern France. The Spanish Fighting Bull is bred for its aggression and physique, and is raised free-range with little human contact.

The practice of bullfighting is controversial because of a range of concerns including animal welfare, funding, and religion. While some forms are considered a blood sport, in some countries, for example Spain, it is defined as an art form or cultural event, and local regulations define it as a cultural event or heritage. Bullfighting is illegal in most countries, but remains legal in most areas of Spain and Portugal, as well as in some Latin American countries and some parts of southern France and the Philippines. In Colombia, it is being phased out with a full ban coming into effect in 2027.

== History ==
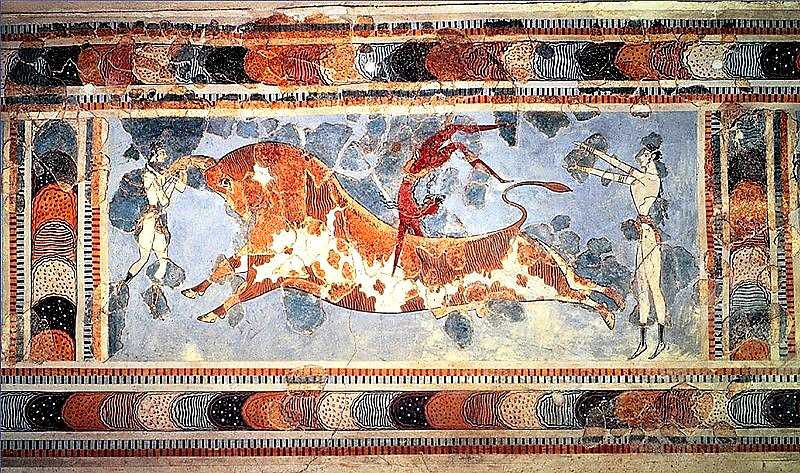
Bull-leaping: Fresco from Knossos, Crete

Bullfighting traces its roots to prehistoric bull worship and sacrifice in Mesopotamia and the Mediterranean region. The first recorded bullfight may be the Epic of Gilgamesh, which describes a scene in which Gilgamesh and Enkidu fought and killed the Bull of Heaven ("The Bull seemed indestructible, for hours they fought, till Gilgamesh dancing in front of the Bull, lured it with his tunic and bright weapons, and Enkidu thrust his sword, deep into the Bull's neck, and killed it"). Bull-leaping was portrayed in Crete and myths related to bulls throughout Greece.

The cosmic connotations of the ancient Iranian practice of bull sacrifice are reflected in Zoroaster's Gathas and the Avesta. The killing of the sacred bull (tauroctony) is the essential central iconic act of the Iranian Mithras, which was commemorated in the mithraeum wherever Roman soldiers were stationed. The oldest representation of what seems to be a man facing a bull is on the Celtiberian tombstone from Clunia and the cave painting El toro de hachos, both found in Spain.

Bullfighting is often linked to Rome, where many human-versus-animal events were held as competition and entertainment, the Venationes. These hunting games spread to Africa, Asia, and Europe during Roman times. There are also theories that it was introduced into Hispania by the Emperor Claudius, as a substitute for gladiators, when he instituted a short-lived ban on gladiatorial combat. The latter theory was supported by Robert Graves (picadors are related to warriors who wielded the javelin, but their role in the contest is now a minor one limited to "preparing" the bull for the matador.) Spanish colonists took the practice of breeding cattle and bullfighting to the American colonies, the Pacific, and Asia. In the 19th century, areas of southern and southwestern France adopted bullfighting, developing their distinctive form.

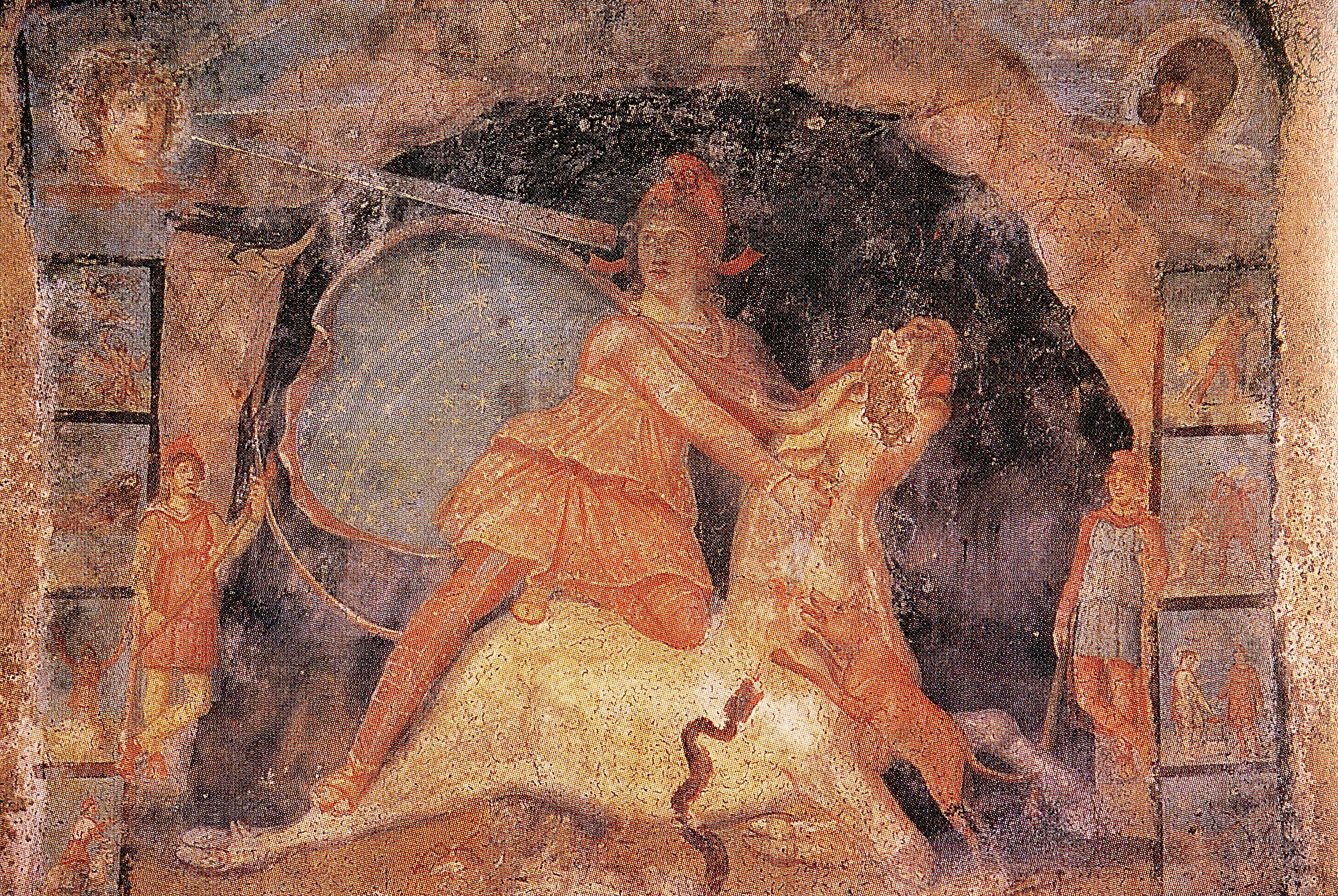
Mithras killing a bull

Religious festivities and royal weddings were celebrated by fights in the local plaza, where noblemen would ride competing for royal favor, and the populace enjoyed the excitement. In the Middle Ages across Europe, knights would joust in competitions on horseback. In Spain, they began to fight bulls.

In medieval Spain bullfighting was considered a noble sport and reserved for the rich, who could afford to supply and train their horses. The bull was released into a closed arena where a single fighter on horseback was armed with a lance. This spectacle was said to be enjoyed by Charlemagne, Alfonso X the Wise and the Almohad caliphs, among others. While a bullfighting monograph from 1777 asserts that El Cid had lanced bulls, it has not been proven from medieval sources. According to a chronicle of the time, in 1128 "... when Alfonso VII of León and Castile married Berengaria of Barcelona daughter of Ramon Berenguer III, Count of Barcelona at Saldaña among other celebrations, there were also bullfights."

In the time of Emperor Charles V, Pedro Ponce de Leon was the most famous bullfighter in Spain and a renovator of the technique of killing the bull on a horse with blindfolded eyes. Juan de Quirós, the best Sevillian poet of that time, dedicated to him a poem in Latin, of which Benito Arias Montano transmits some verses.

Francisco Romero, from Ronda, Spain, is generally regarded as having been the first to introduce the practice of fighting bulls on foot around 1726, using the muleta in the last stage of the fight and an estoc to kill the bull. This type of fighting drew more attention from the crowds. Thus the modern corrida, or fight, began to take form, as riding noblemen were replaced by commoners on foot. This new style prompted the construction of dedicated bullrings, initially square, like the Plaza de Armas, and later round, to discourage the cornering of the action.

The modern style of Spanish bullfighting is credited to Juan Belmonte, generally considered the greatest matador of all time. Belmonte introduced a daring and revolutionary style, in which he stayed within a few centimeters of the bull throughout the fight. Although extremely dangerous (Belmonte was gored on many occasions), his style is still seen by most matadors as the ideal to be emulated.

== Styles ==
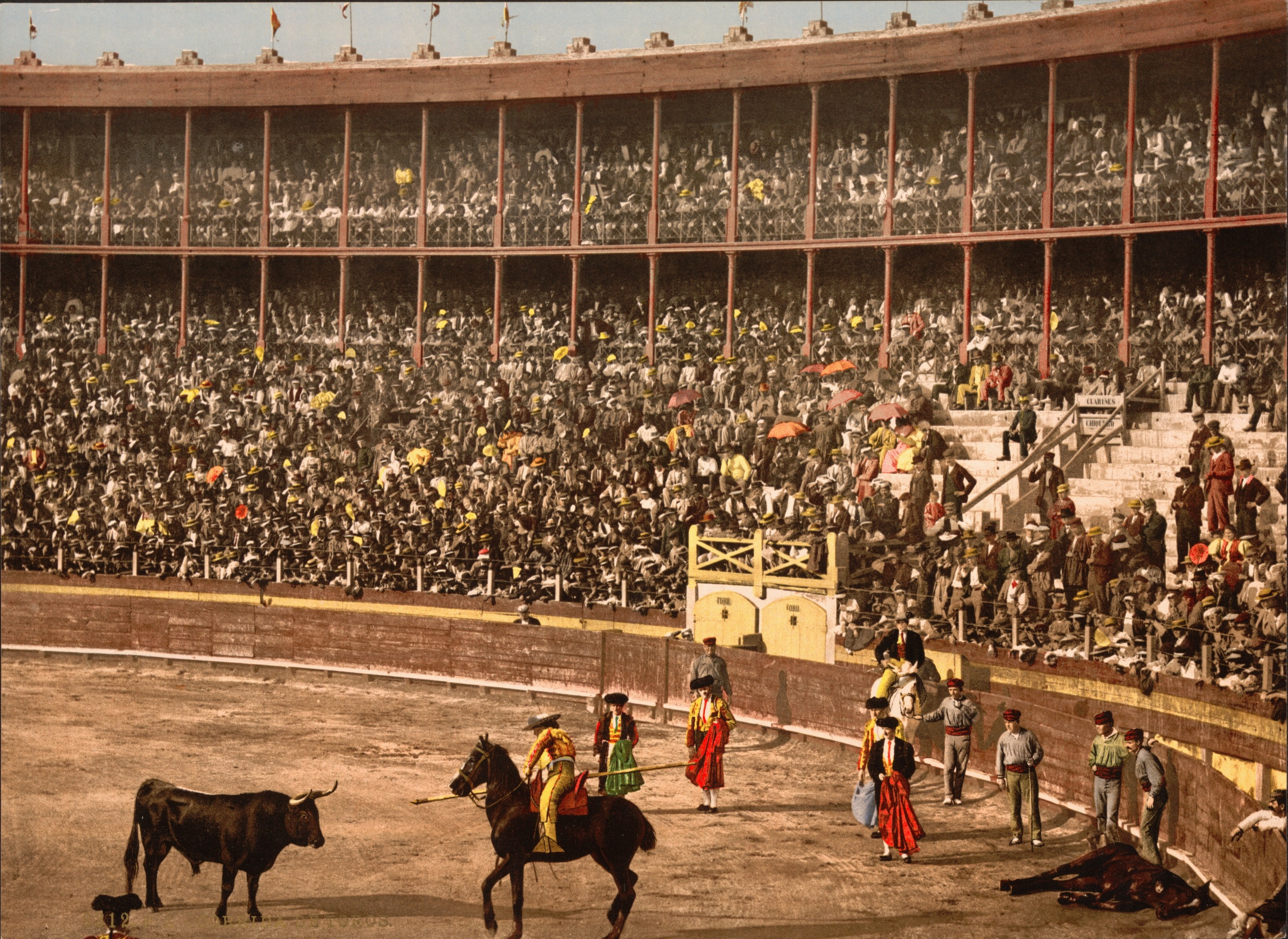
A bull fight in Barcelona, Spain, c. 1900

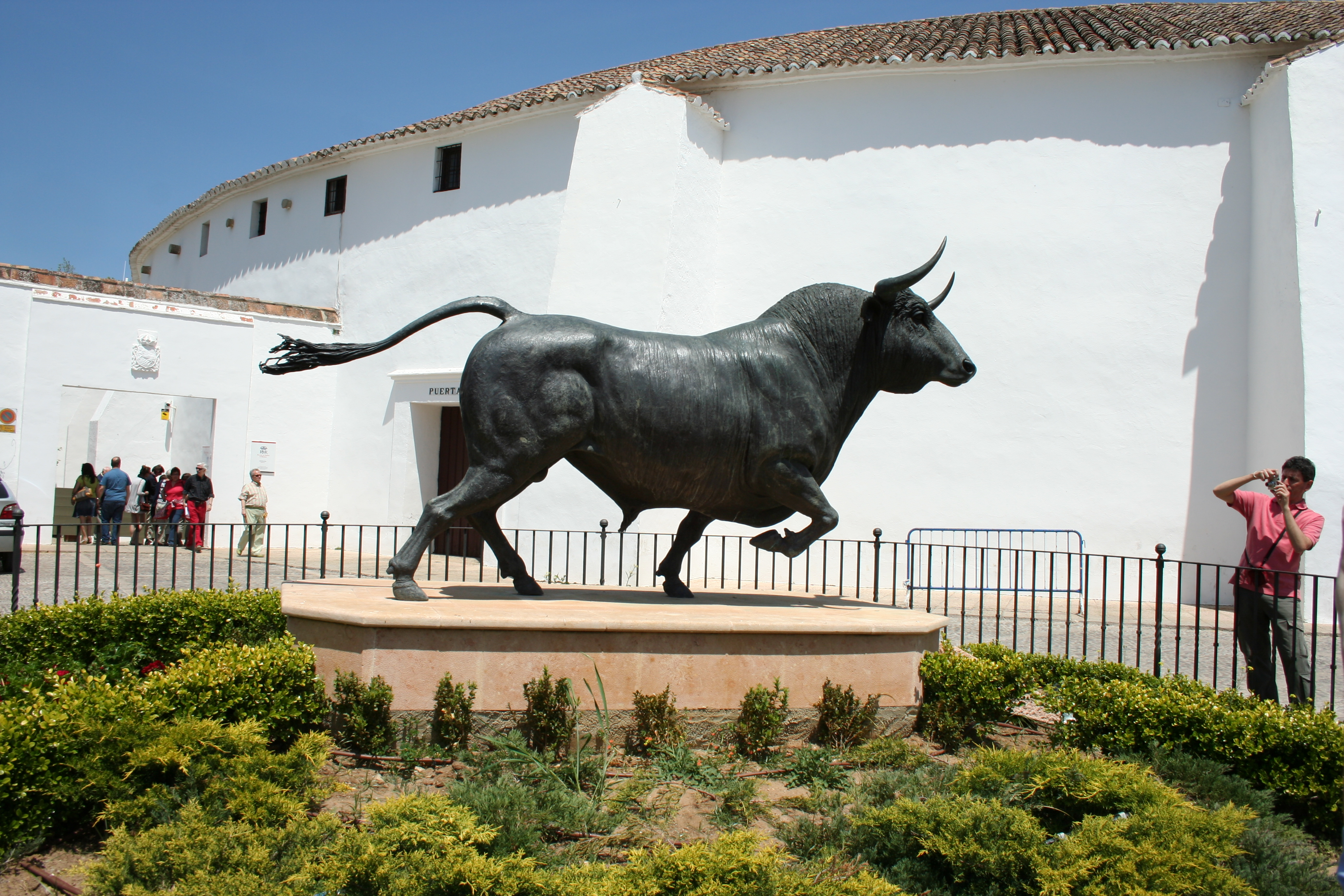
Monument to a bull, Plaza de Toros de Ronda (Ronda bullring), Spain

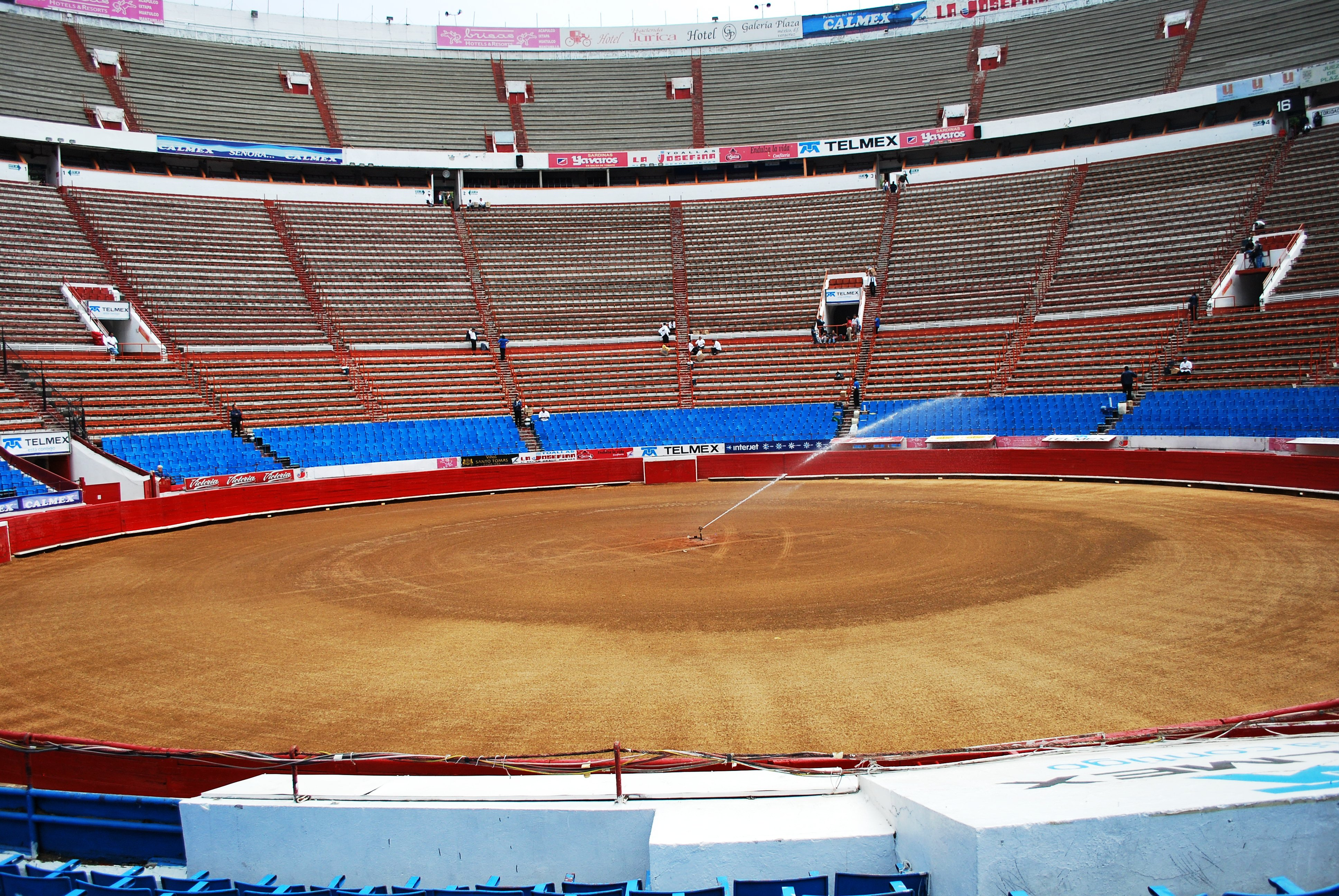
Plaza México, with a capacity of 41,000 seats, is the largest bullring in the world by seating capacity.

Originally, at least five distinct regional styles of bullfighting were practised in southwestern Europe: Andalusia, Aragon–Navarre, Alentejo, Camargue, Aquitaine. Over time, these have evolved more or less into standardized national forms mentioned below. The "classic" style of bullfighting, in which the rule is to kill the bull, is the style practiced in Spain and many Latin American countries.

Bullfighting stadia are named "bullrings". There are many historic bullrings; the oldest are the 1700s Spanish plazas of Sevilla and Ronda. The largest bullring is the Plaza México in Mexico City, which seats 41,000 people.

=== Spanish ===
Spanish-style bullfighting is called corrida de toros (literally "coursing of bulls") or la fiesta ("the festival"). In the traditional corrida, three matadores each fight two bulls, each of which is between four and six years old and weighs no less than 460 kg (1,014 lb). Each matador has six assistants: two picadores (lancers mounted on horseback), three banderilleros – who along with the matadors are collectively known as toreros (bullfighters) – and a mozo de espadas (sword page). Collectively they comprise a cuadrilla (entourage). In Spanish the more general torero or diestro (literally 'right-hander') is used for the lead fighter, and only when needed to distinguish a man is the full title matador de toros used; in English, "matador" is generally used for the bullfighter.

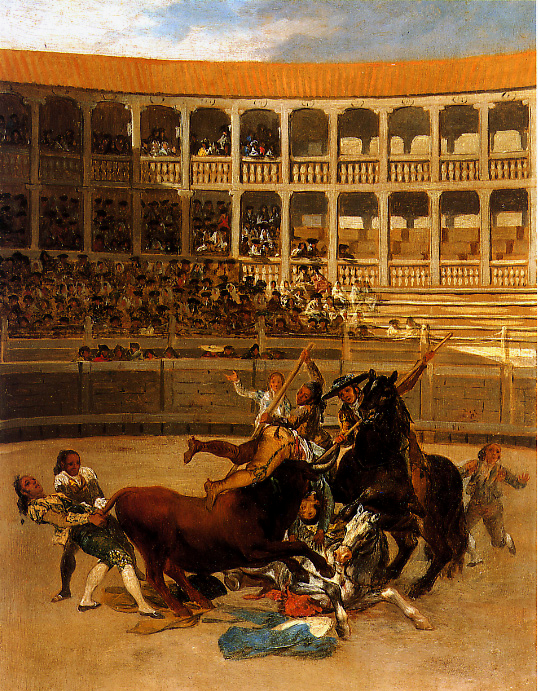
Death of the Picador – Francisco de Goya, c. 1793

Start of tercio de muerte: polished verónica and larga serpentina during a goyesca corrida.

Welcoming of a toro: a porta gayola and series of verónica, terminated by a semi-verónica.

==== Structure ====
The modern corrida is highly ritualized, with three distinct stages or tercios ("thirds"); the start of each being announced by a bugle sound. The participants enter the arena in a parade, called the paseíllo, to salute the presiding dignitary, accompanied by band music. Torero costumes are inspired by 17th-century Andalusian clothing, and matadores are easily distinguished by the gold of their traje de luces ("suit of lights"), as opposed to the lesser banderilleros, who are also known as toreros de plata ("bullfighters of silver").

==== Tercio de Varas ====
The bull is released into the ring, where he is tested for ferocity by the matador and banderilleros with the magenta and gold capote ("cape"). This is the first stage, the tercio de varas ("the lancing third"). The matador confronts the bull with the capote, performing a series of passes and observing the behavior and quirks of the bull.

Next, a picador enters the arena on horseback armed with a vara (lance). To protect the horse from the bull's horns, the animal wears a protective, padded covering called peto. Prior to 1930, the horses did not wear any protection. Often the bull would disembowel the horse during this stage. Until the use of protection was instituted, the number of horses killed during a fiesta generally exceeded the number of bulls killed.

At this point, the picador stabs just behind the morrillo, a mound of muscle on the fighting bull's neck, weakening the neck muscles and leading to the animal's first loss of blood. The manner in which the bull charges the horse provides important clues to the matador about the bull such as which horn the bull favors. As a result of the injury and also the fatigue of striving to injure the armoured heavy horse, the bull holds its head and horns slightly lower during the following stages of the fight. This ultimately enables the matador to perform the killing thrust later in the performance. The encounter with the picador often fundamentally changes the behavior of a bull; distracted and unengaging bulls will become more focused and stay on a single target instead of charging at everything that moves, conserving their diminished energy reserves.

==== Tercio de Banderillas ====
In the next stage, the tercio de banderillas ("the third of banderillas"), each of the three banderilleros attempts to plant two banderillas, sharp barbed sticks, into the bull's shoulders. These anger and agitate the bull reinvigorating him from the aplomado (literally "leadened") state his attacks on the horse and injuries from the lance left him in. Sometimes a matador will place his own banderillas. If so, he usually embellishes this part of his performance and employs more varied maneuvers than the standard al cuarteo method commonly used by banderilleros.

==== Tercio de Muerte ====
In the final stage, the tercio de muerte ("the third of death"), the matador re-enters the ring alone with a smaller red cloth, or muleta, and a sword. It is a common misconception that the color red is supposed to anger the bull; the animals are functionally colorblind in this respect: the bull is incited to charge by the movement of the muleta. The muleta is thought to be red to mask the bull's blood, although the color is now a matter of tradition. The matador uses his muleta to attract the bull in a series of passes, which serve the dual purpose of wearing the animal down for the kill and creating sculptural forms between man and animal that can fascinate or thrill the audience, and which when linked together in a rhythm create a dance of passes, or faena. The matador will often try to enhance the drama of the dance by bringing the bull's horns especially close to his body. The faena refers to the entire performance with the muleta.

The faena is usually broken down into tandas, or "series", of passes. The faena ends with a final series of passes in which the matador, using the cape, tries to maneuver the bull into a position to stab it between the shoulder blades going over the horns and thus exposing his own body to the bull. The sword is called estoque, and the act of thrusting the sword is called an estocada. During the initial series, while the matador in part is performing for the crowd, he uses a fake sword (estoque simulado). This is made of wood or aluminum, making it lighter and much easier to handle. The estoque de verdad (real sword) is made out of steel. At the end of the tercio de muerte, when the matador has finished his faena, he will change swords to take up the steel one. He performs the estocada with the intent of piercing the heart or aorta, or severing other major blood vessels to induce a quick death if all goes according to plan. Often this does not happen and repeated efforts must be made to bring the bull down, sometimes the matador changing to the 'descabello', which resembles a sword, but is actually a heavy dagger blade at the end of a steel rod which is thrust between the cervical vertebrae to sever the spinal column and induce instant death. Even if the descabello is not required and the bull falls quickly from the sword one of the banderilleros will perform this function with an actual dagger to ensure the bull is dead.

If the matador has performed particularly well, the crowd may petition the president by waving white handkerchiefs to award the matador an ear of the bull. If his performance was exceptional, the president will award two ears. In certain more rural rings, the practice includes an award of the bull's tail. Very rarely, if the public and the matador believe that the bull has fought extremely bravely – and the breeder of the bull agrees to have it return to the ranch – the event's president may grant a pardon (indulto). If the indulto is granted, the bull's life is spared; it leaves the ring alive and is returned to its home ranch for treatment and then to become a semental, or seed-bull, for the rest of its life.

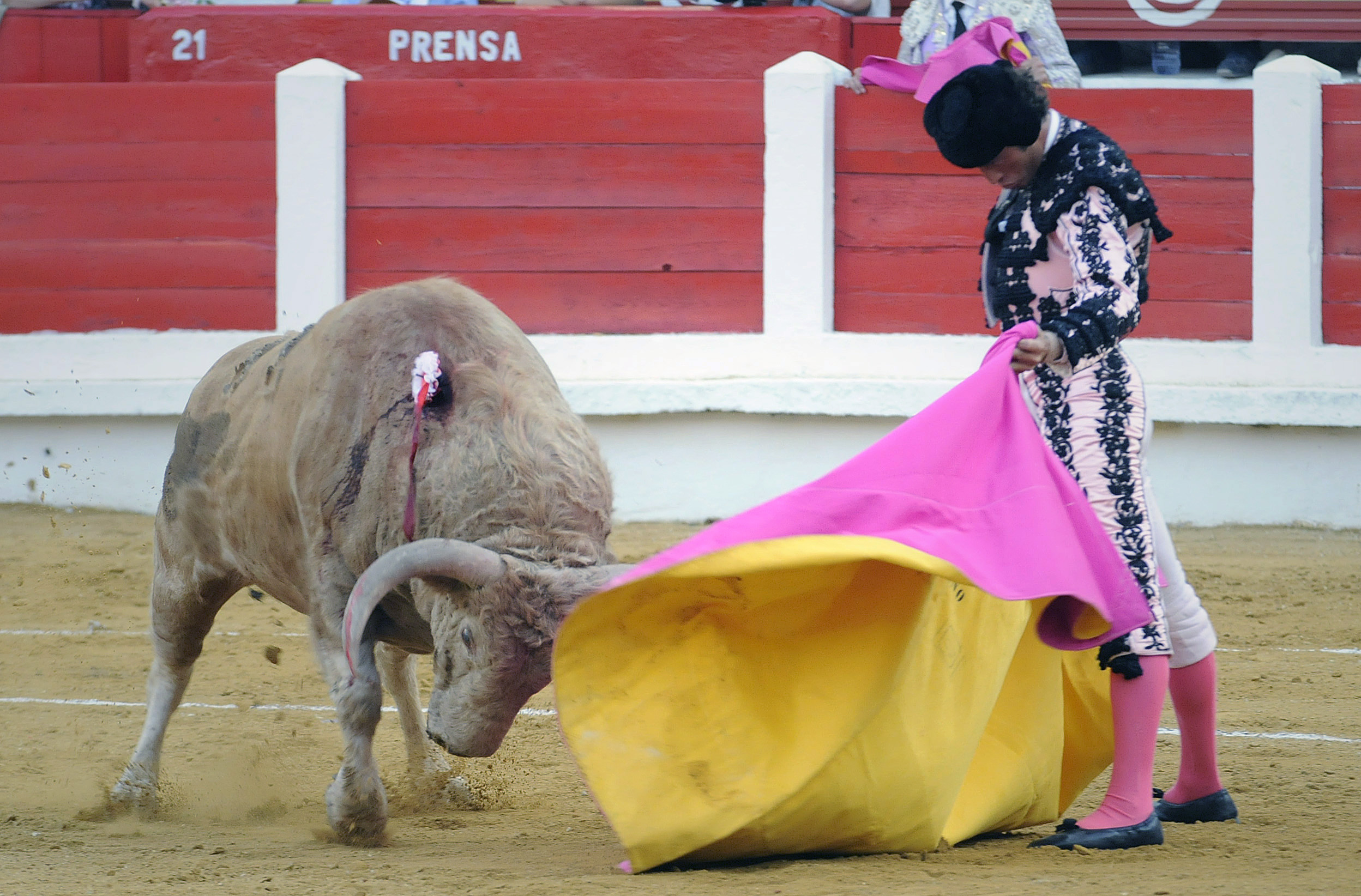
First tercio: torero drawing a Verónica.

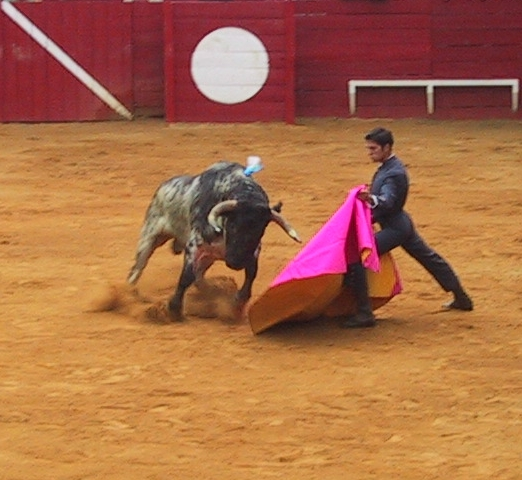
First tercio: matador making another kind of Verónica.

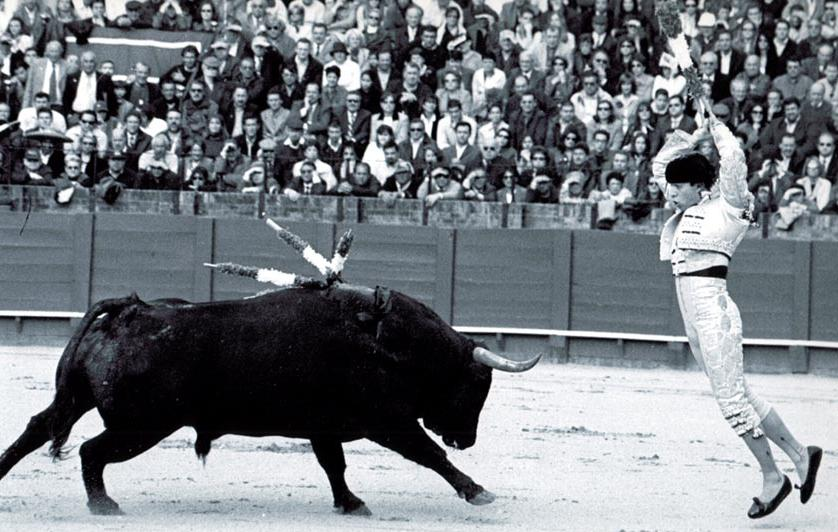
Second tercio: banderillero.

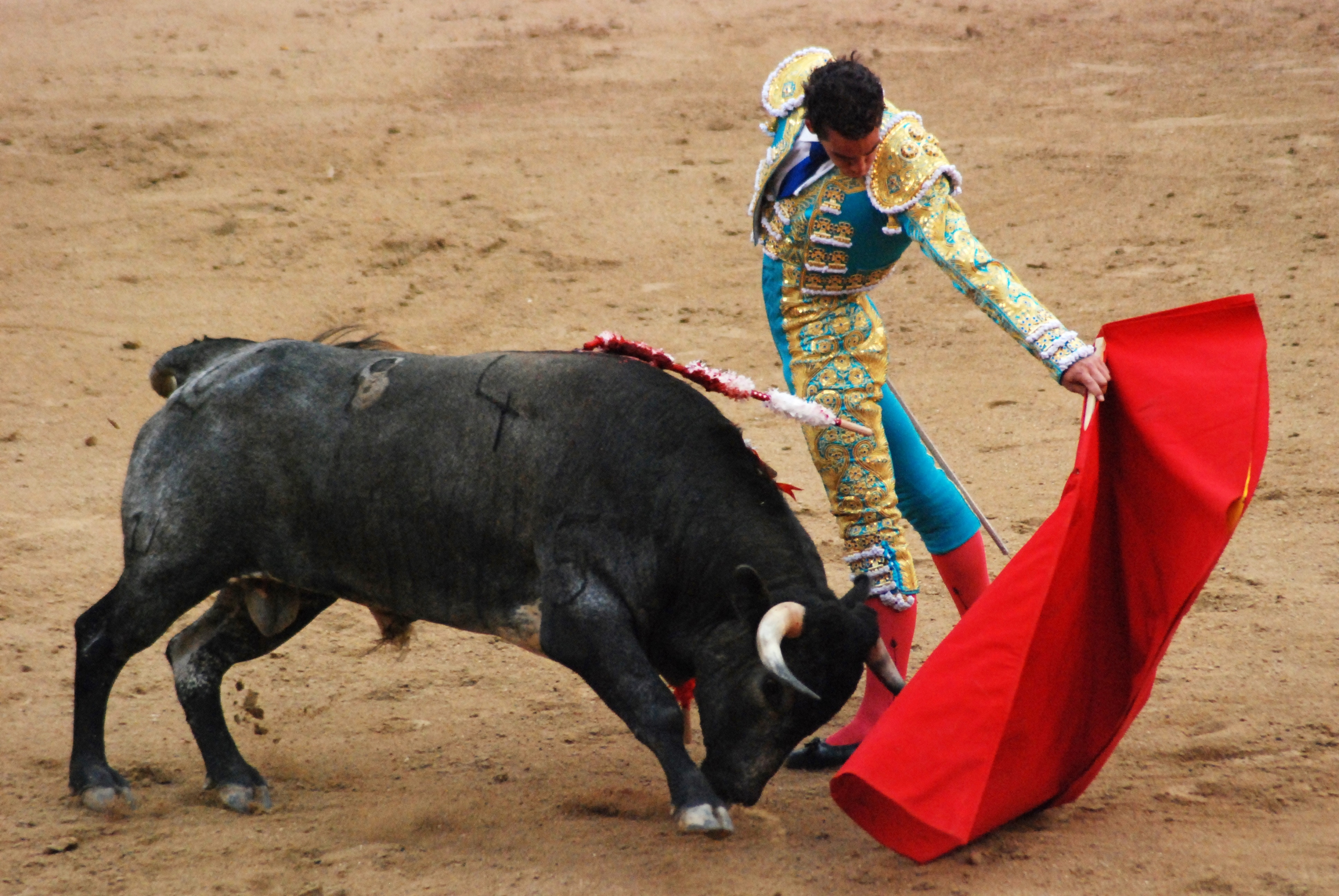
Third tercio: faena of muleta.

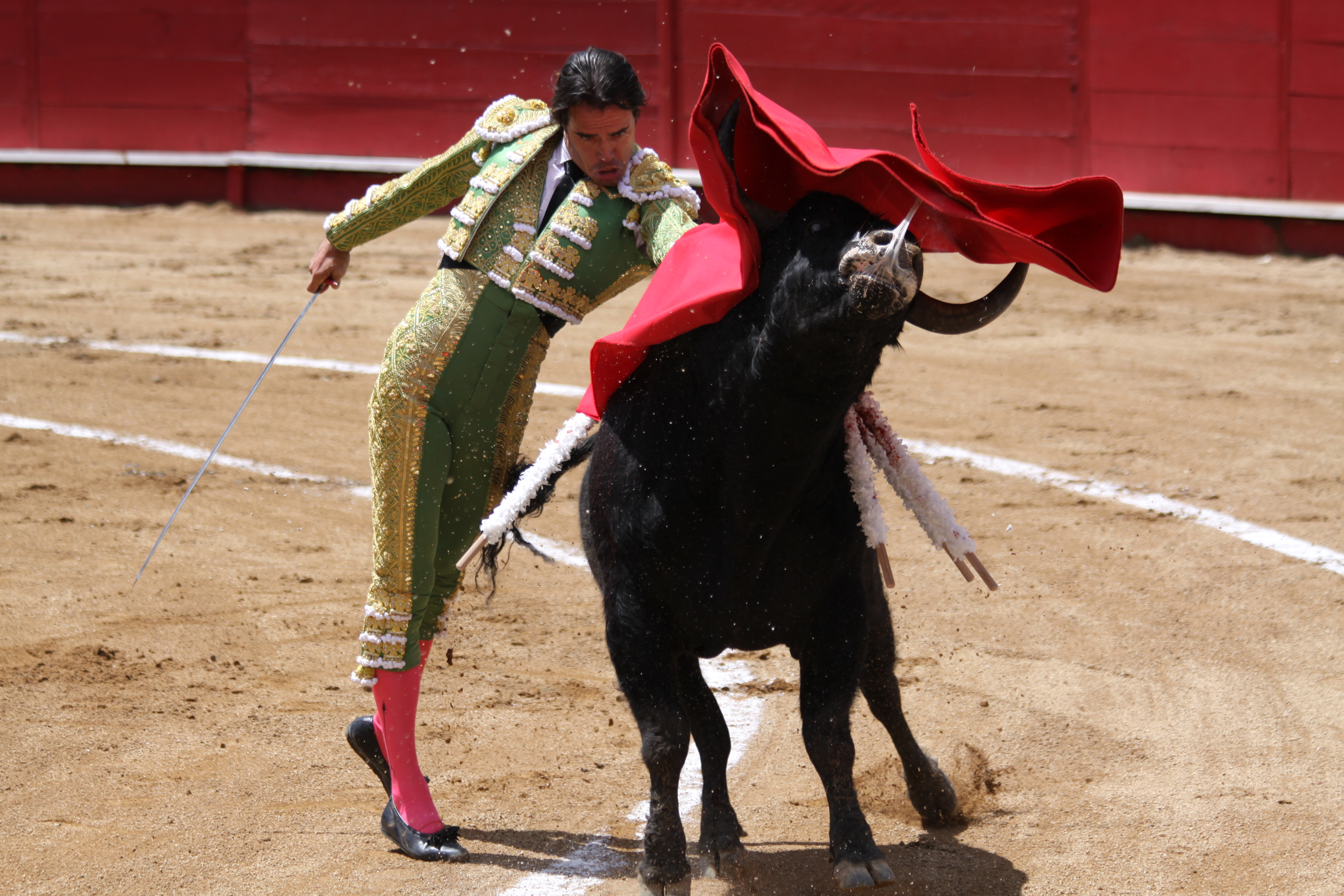
Third tercio: faena of muleta.

==== Recortes ====
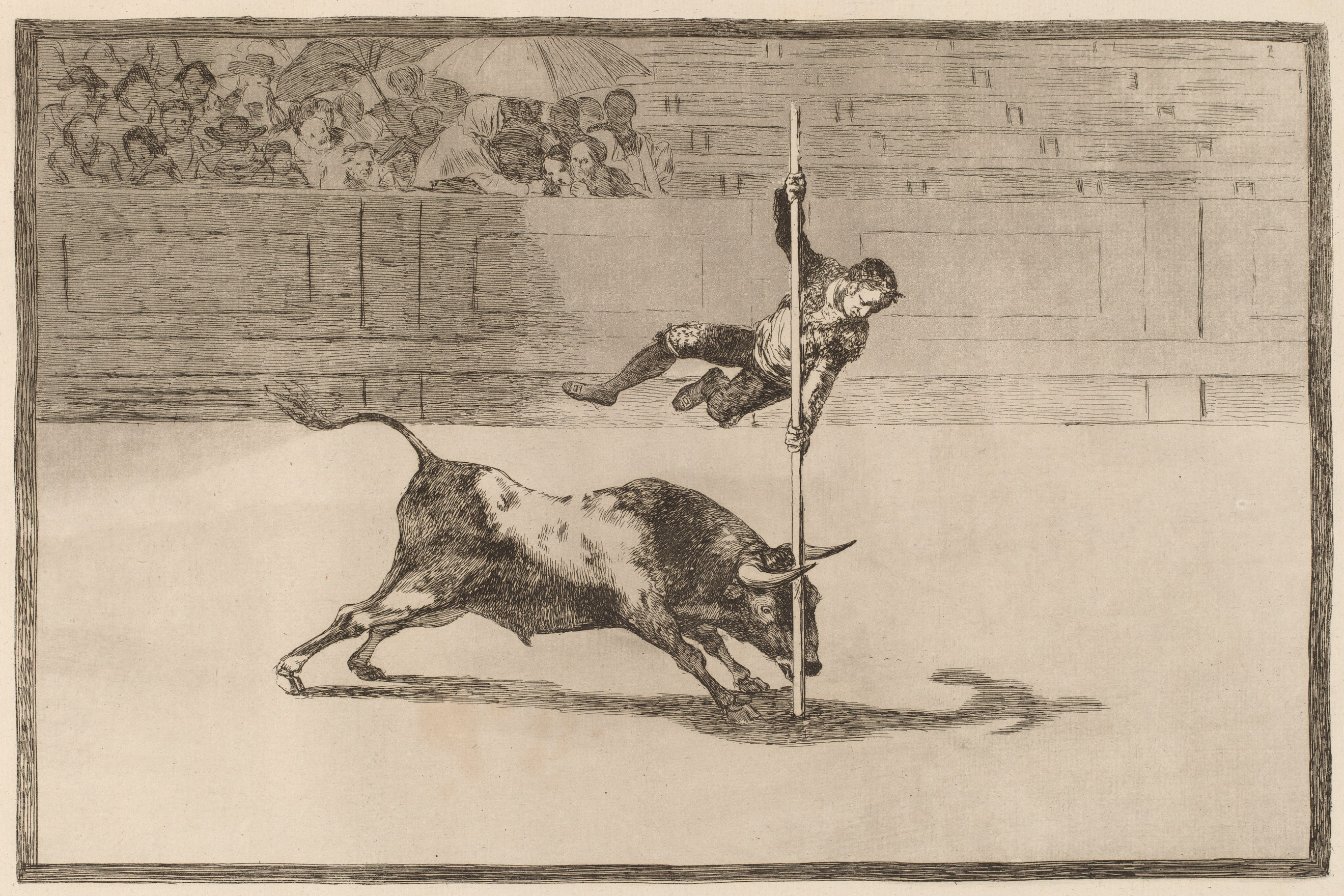
Goya: The Speed and Daring of Juanito Apiñani in the Ring of Madrid 1815–16 (Tauromaquia, Νο. 20). Etching and aquatint.

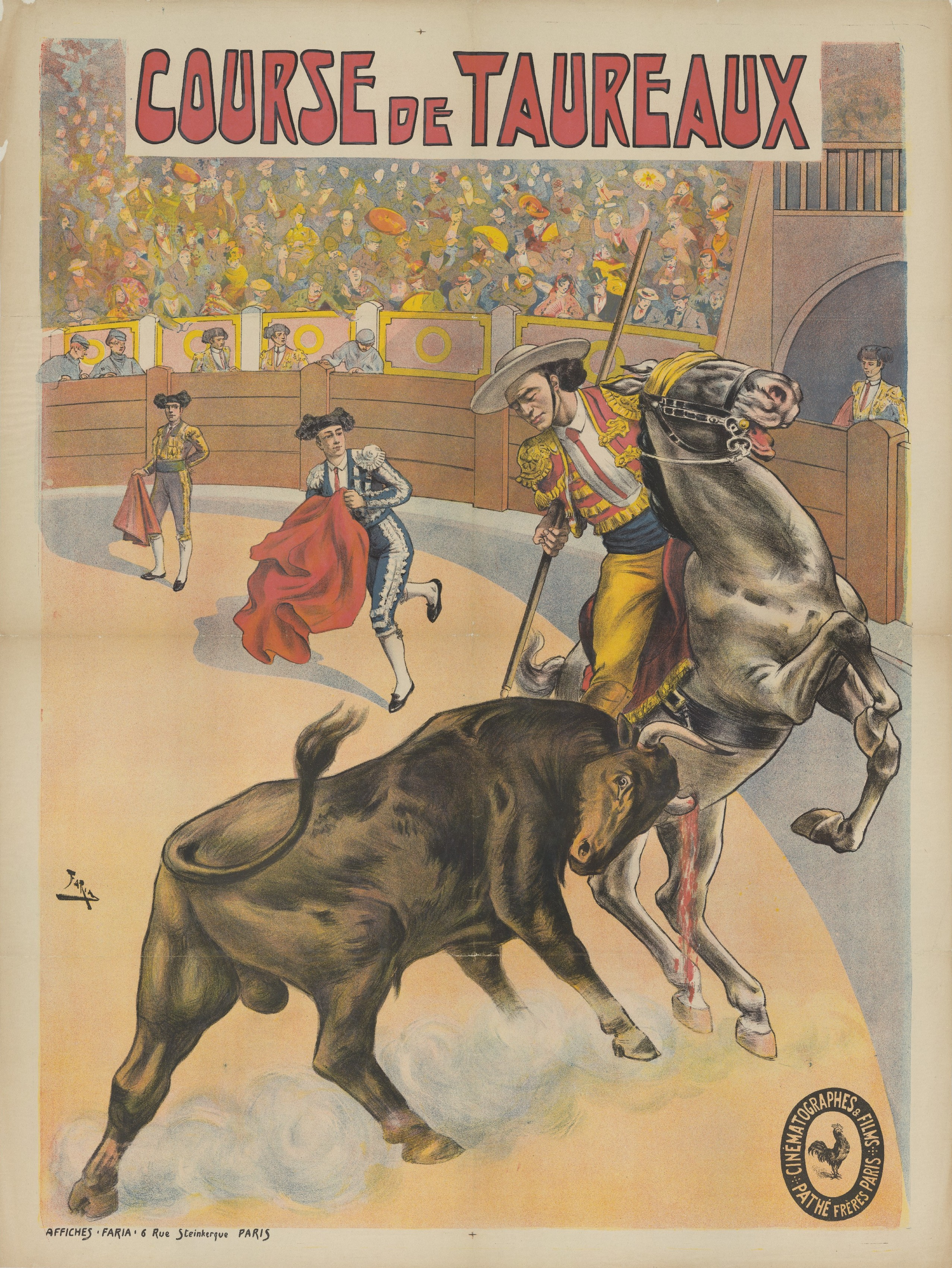
Poster by Cândido de Faria for the silent film Course de taureaux à Séville (1907, Pathé Frères). Chromolithograph. EYE Film Institute Netherlands.

Recortes, a style of bullfighting practiced in Navarre, La Rioja, north of Castile and Valencia, has been much less popular than the traditional corridas. But recortes have undergone a revival in Spain and are sometimes broadcast on TV.

This style was common in the early 19th century. Etchings by painter Francisco de Goya depict these events.

Recortes differ from corridas in the following manners:

- The bull is not physically injured. Drawing blood is rare, and the bull is allowed to return to his pen at the end of the performance.
- The men are dressed in common street clothes rather than traditional bullfighting dress.
- Acrobatics are performed often without the use of capes or other props. Performers attempt to evade the bull solely through the swiftness of their movements.
- Rituals are less strict, so the men have the freedom to perform stunts as they please.
- Men work in teams, but with less role distinction than with corridas.
- Teams compete for points awarded by a jury.

==== Comic bullfighting ====
Comical spectacles based on bullfighting, called espectáculos cómico-taurinos or charlotadas, are still popular in Spain and Mexico. Troupes include El empastre or El bombero torero.

==== Encierros ====
An encierro, or running of the bulls, is an activity related to a bullfighting fiesta. Before the events that are held in the ring, people (usually young men) run in front of a small group of bulls that have been let loose, on a course of a sectioned-off subset of a town's streets.

==== Toro embolado ====
A toro embolado (in Spanish), bou embolat (in Catalan), roughly meaning "bull with balls", is a festive activity held at night and typical of many towns in Spain (mainly in the Valencian Community and Southern Catalonia). Balls of flammable material are attached to a bull's horns. The balls are lit and the bull is set free in the streets at night; participants dodge the bull when it comes close. It can be considered a variant of an encierro (correbous in Catalan). This activity is held in a number of Spanish towns during their local festivals.

=== Portuguese ===
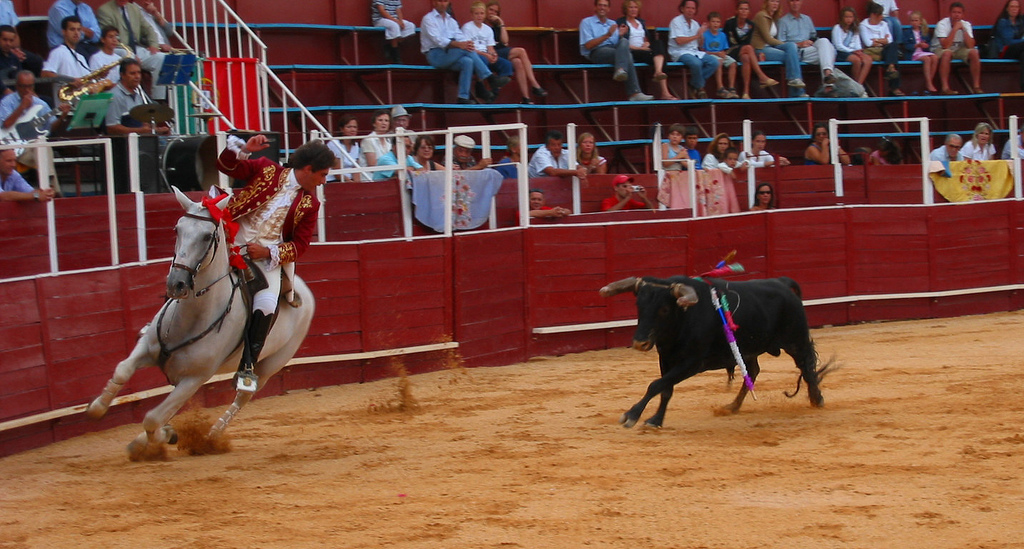
Cavaleiro and bull

Most Portuguese bullfights are held in two phases: the spectacle of the cavaleiro, and the pega. In the cavaleiro, a horseman on a Portuguese Lusitano horse (specially trained for the fights) fights the bull from horseback. The purpose of this fight is to stab three or four bandeiras (small javelins) into the back of the bull.

In the second stage, called the pega ("holding"), the forcados, a group of eight men, challenge the bull directly without any protection or weapon of defense. The frontman provokes the bull into a charge to perform a pega de cara or pega de caras (face grab). The frontman secures the animal's head and is quickly aided by his fellows who surround and secure the animal until he is subdued. Forcados are dressed in a traditional costume of damask or velvet, with long knitted hats as worn by the campinos (bull headers) from Ribatejo.

The bull is not killed in the ring and, at the end of the corrida, leading oxen are let into the arena, and two campinos on foot herd the bull among them back to its pen. The bull is usually killed out of sight of the audience by a professional butcher. Some bulls, after an exceptional performance, are healed, released to pasture and used for breeding.

In the Portuguese Azores islands, there is a form of bullfighting called tourada à corda, in which a bull is led on a rope along a street, while players taunt and dodge the bull, who is not killed during or after the fight, but returned to pasture and used in later events.

Rádio e Televisão de Portugal (RTP) ceased to broadcast bullfights in Portugal since 2021.

=== France ===
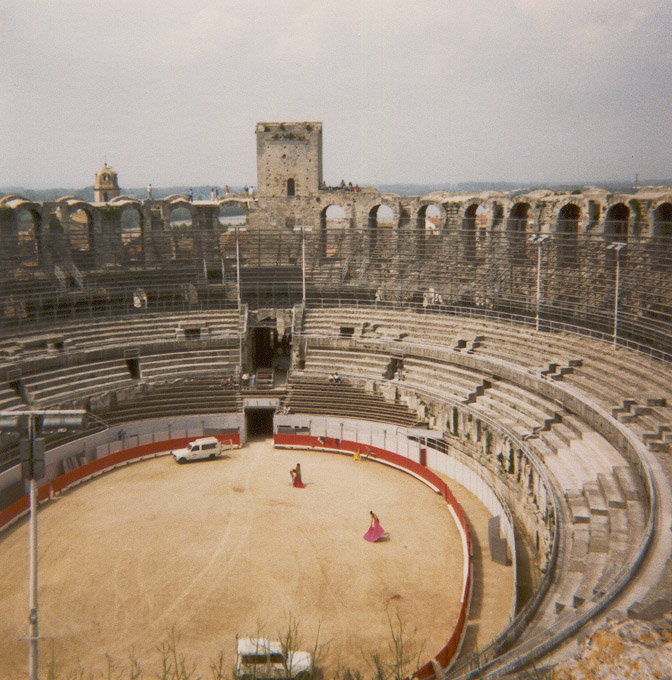
The Roman amphitheater at Arles being fitted for a corrida

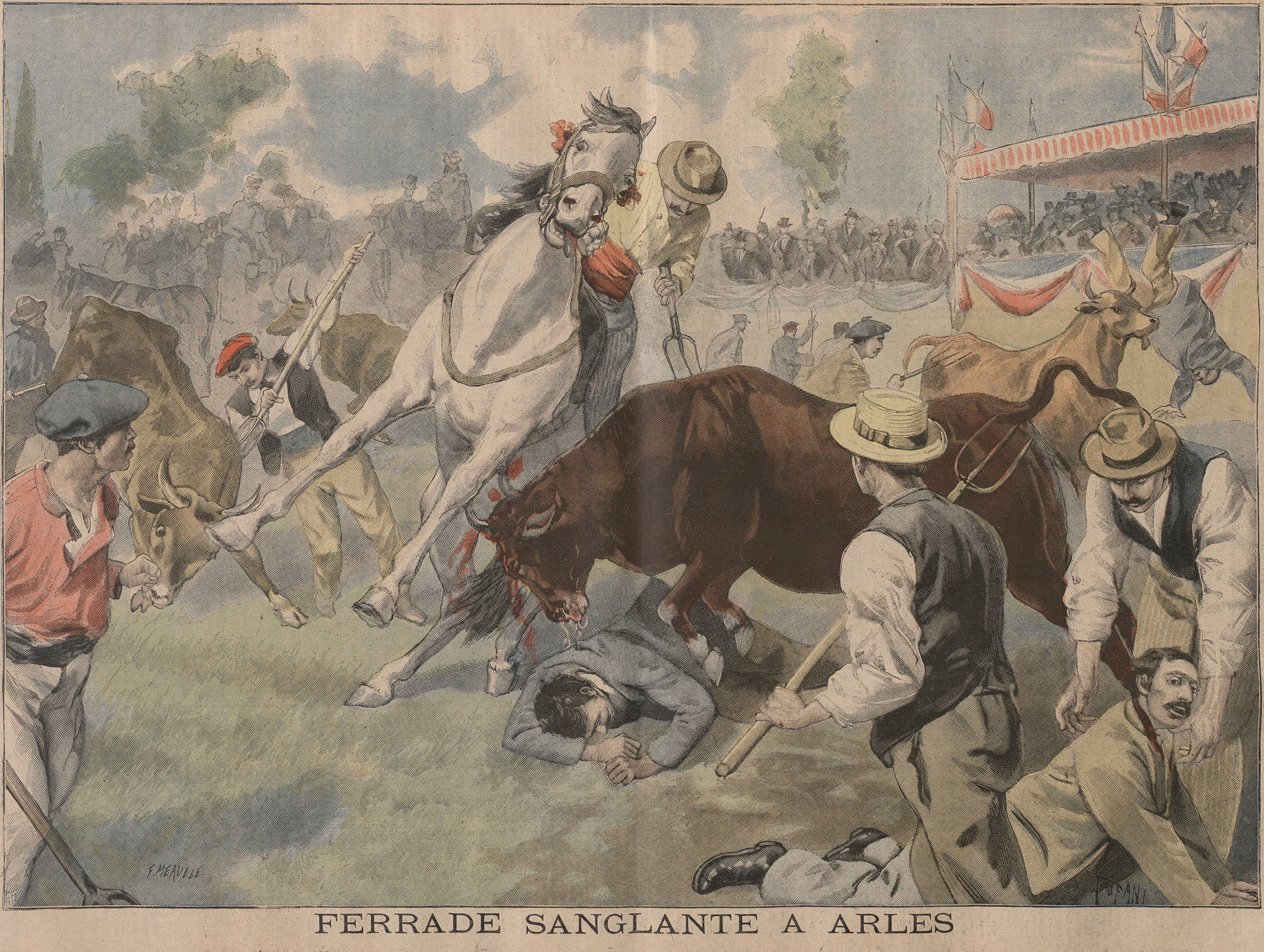
A bullfight in Arles in 1898

Since the 19th century, Spanish-style corridas have been increasingly popular in Southern France, where they enjoy legal protection in areas where there is an uninterrupted tradition of such bull fights, particularly during holidays such as Whitsun or Easter. Among France's most important venues for bullfighting are the ancient Roman arenas of Nîmes and Arles, although there are bull rings across the South from the Mediterranean to the Atlantic coasts. The Brava cattle are bred for bullfighting.

Bullfights of this kind follow the Spanish tradition and even Spanish words are used for all Bullfighting related terms. Minor cosmetic differences exist such as music. This is not to be confused with the bloodless bullfights referred to below which are indigenous to France.

==== Course camarguaise (course libre) ====
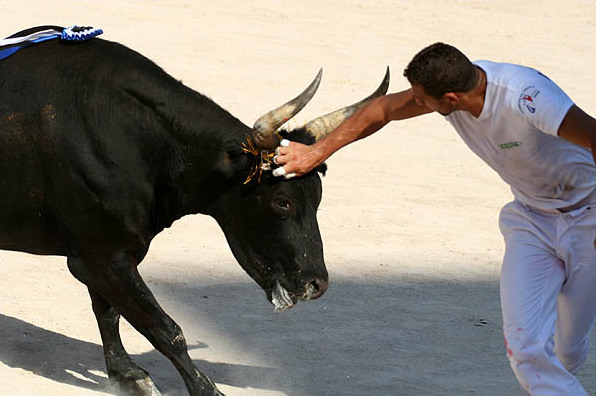
A raseteur takes a rosette.

A more indigenous genre of bullfighting is widely common in the Provence and Languedoc areas, and is known alternately as "course libre" or "course camarguaise" (Occitan: Curs Camarguesa, Curs liure). This is a bloodless spectacle (for the bulls) in which the objective is to snatch a rosette from the head of a young bull. The participants, or raseteurs, begin training in their early teens against young bulls from the Camargue region of Provence before graduating to regular contests held principally in Arles and Nîmes but also in other Provençal and Languedoc towns and villages. Before the course, an abrivado – a running of the bulls in the streets – takes place, in which young men compete to outrun the charging bulls. The course itself takes place in a small (often portable) arena erected in a town square. For a period of about 15–20 minutes, the raseteurs compete to snatch rosettes (cocarde) tied between the bulls' horns. They do not take the rosette with their bare hands but with a claw-shaped metal instrument called a raset or crochet (hook) in their hands, hence their name. Afterward, the bulls are herded back to their pen by gardians (Camarguais cowboys) in a bandido, amidst a great deal of ceremony. The stars of these spectacles are the bulls.

==== Course landaise ====
Another type of French 'bullfighting' is the "course landaise", in which cows are used instead of bulls. This is a competition between teams named cuadrillas, which belong to certain breeding estates. A cuadrilla is made up of a teneur de corde, an entraîneur, a sauteur, and six écarteurs. The cows are brought to the arena in crates and then taken out in order. The teneur de corde controls the dangling rope attached to the cow's horns and the entraîneur positions the cow to face and attack the player. The écarteurs will try, at the last possible moment, to dodge around the cow and the sauteur will leap over it. Each team aims to complete a set of at least one hundred dodges and eight leaps. This is the main scheme of the "classic" form, the course landaise formelle. However, different rules may be applied in some competitions. For example, competitions for Coupe Jeannot Lafittau are arranged with cows without ropes.

At one point, it resulted in so many fatalities that the French government tried to ban it but had to back down in the face of local opposition. The bulls themselves are generally fairly small, much less imposing than the adult bulls employed in the corrida. Nonetheless, the bulls remain dangerous due to their mobility and vertically formed horns. Participants and spectators share the risk; it is not unknown for angry bulls to smash their way through barriers and charge the surrounding crowd of spectators. The course landaise is not seen as a dangerous sport by many, but écarteur Jean-Pierre Rachou died in 2003 when a bull's horn tore his femoral artery.

== Non-bloodsport variations ==
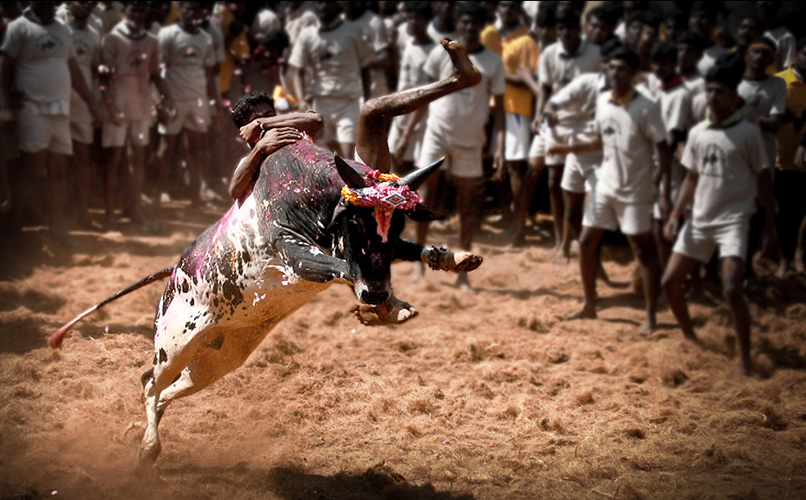
A youth trying to take control of a bull at a Jallikattu in Tamil Nadu, India

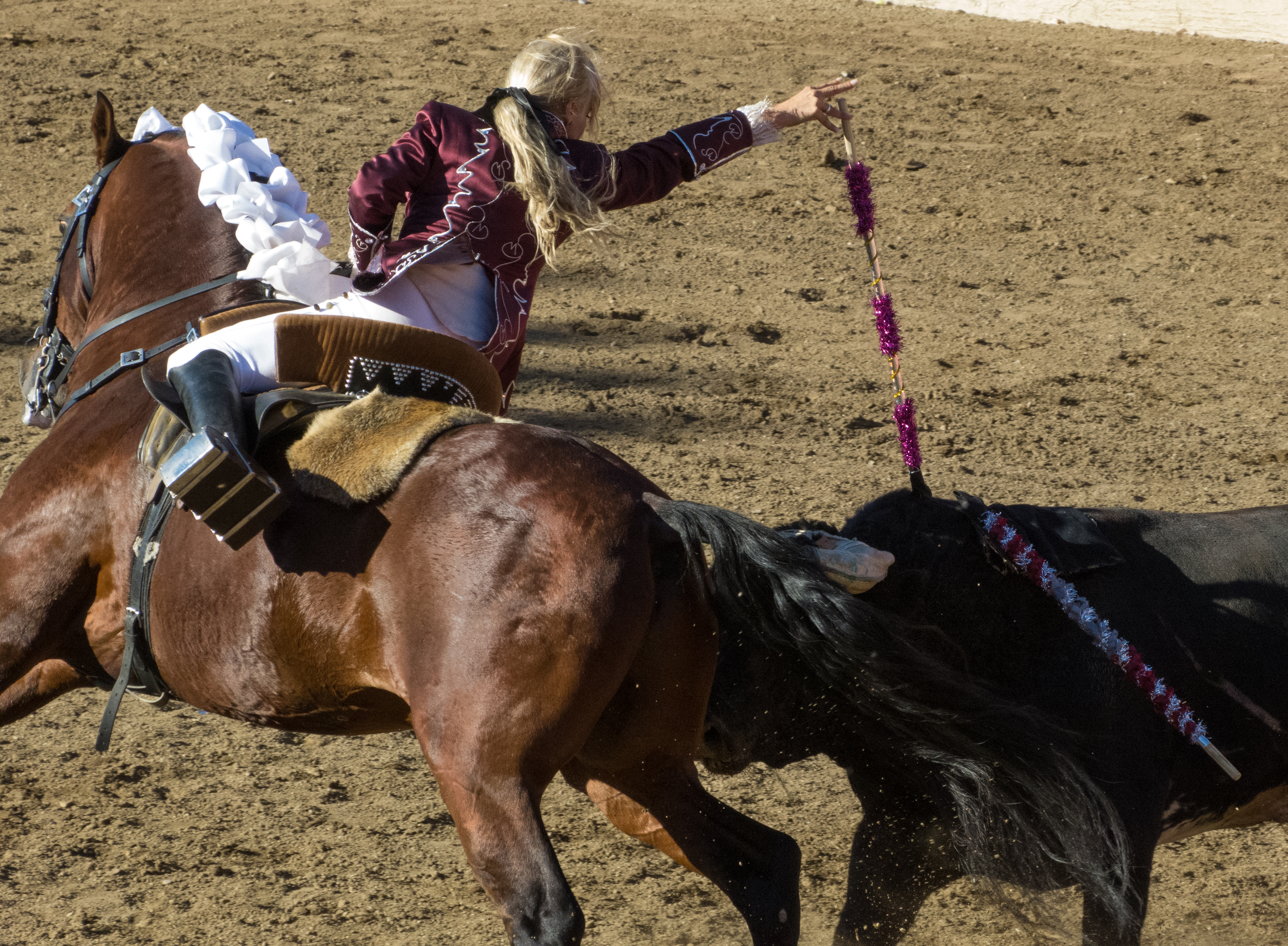
In California, the lances are tipped with hook and loop fasteners (e.g. Velcro) and aimed at pads on the bull.

- In Bolivia, bulls are not killed nor injured with any sticks. The goal of Bolivian toreros is to provoke the bull with taunts without getting harmed themselves.
- In El Seibo Province of the Dominican Republic bullfights are not about killing or harming the animal, but taunting and evading it until it is tired.
- In Canada, Portuguese-style bullfighting was introduced in 1989 by Portuguese immigrants in the town of Listowel in southern Ontario. Despite objections and concerns from local authorities and a humane society, the practice was allowed as the bulls were not killed or injured in this version. In the nearby city of Brampton, Portuguese immigrants from the Azores practice "tourada a corda" (bullfight by rope).
- Jallikattu is a traditional spectacle in Tamil Nadu, India, as a part of Pongal celebrations on Mattu Pongal day. A breed of bos indicus (humped) bulls, called "Jellicut" are used. During jallikattu, a bull is released into a group of people, and participants attempt to grab the bull's hump and hold onto it for a determined distance, length of time, or with the goal of taking a pack of money tied to the bull's horns. The goal of the activity is more similar to bull riding (staying on).
- Savika is a zebu-wrestling sport found in Madagascar, particularly among the Betsileo people.
- American freestyle bullfighting is a style of bullfighting developed in American rodeo. The style was developed by the rodeo clowns who protect bull riders from being trampled or gored by a loose bull. Freestyle bullfighting is a 70-second competition in which the bullfighter (rodeo clown) avoids the bull by means of dodging, jumping, and use of a barrel.
- In California's Central Valley, the historically Portuguese community has developed a form of bullfight in which the bull is taunted by a matador, but the lances are tipped with fabric hook and loop (e.g. Velcro) and they are aimed at hook-and-loop covered pads secured to the bull's shoulder. Fights occur from May through October around traditional Portuguese holidays. While California outlawed bullfighting in 1957, this type of bloodless bullfighting is still allowed if carried out during religious festivals or celebrations.
- In Tanzania, bullfighting was introduced by the Portuguese to Zanzibar and to Pemba Island, in modern Tanzania, where it is known as mchezo wa ng'ombe. Similar to the Portuguese Azorean tourada a corda, the bull is restrained by a rope, generally neither bull nor player is harmed, and the bull is not killed at the end of the fight.

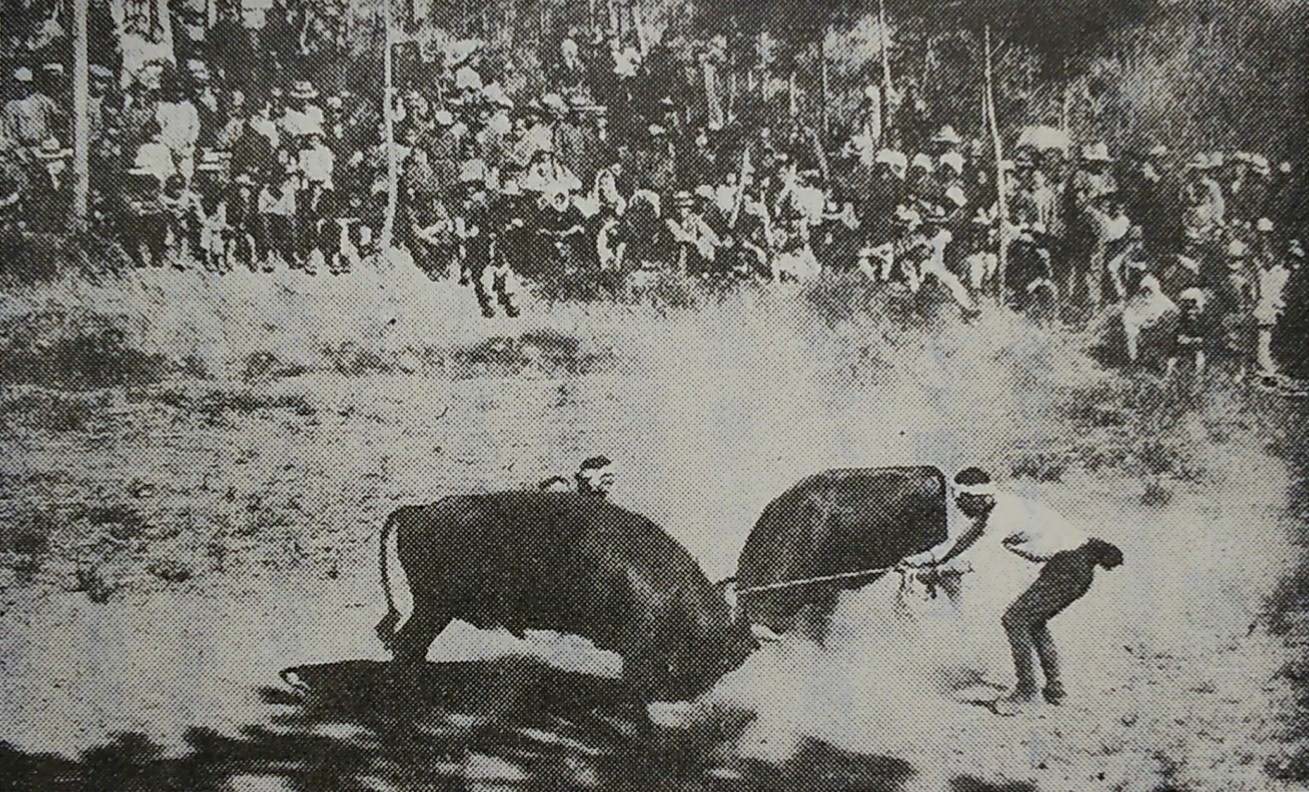
Bullpushing, the bullfight in Okinoshima, Shimane, Japan (1933)

- In Japan, bullfighting is Tōgyū, with a history of at least from the 12th century, as the Emperor Go-Toba was recorded to have been entertained by bullpushing when he was exiled to the Oki Islands. In Japanese bullfighting, during matches, the bulls lock horns and attempt to force each other to give up ground. Each bull has a coach who helps to keep the bulls locked in conflict and encourages their bull to win. The match is over when one of the bulls tires and withdraws, losing the match. The coaches take great care to prevent the bulls from harming each other and the fight is immediately over if one of them accidentally gores the other.
- In Zhejiang, China, guanniu is a traditional form of bullfighting in which contestants attempt to physically wrestle a bull to the ground.
- In Costa Rica, bullfighters attempt to subdue bulls by riding them to exhaustion. Unlike American bull riding, Costa Rican bullfighting is not timed and there are no standards to determine victory. Instead, victory is contingent on the quality of the performance, charisma, and showmanship. While bullfighting in countries such as Spain originated as entertainment for the elite classes, Costa Rican bullfighting originated among farmers who could not afford to kill their bulls.

== Hazards ==
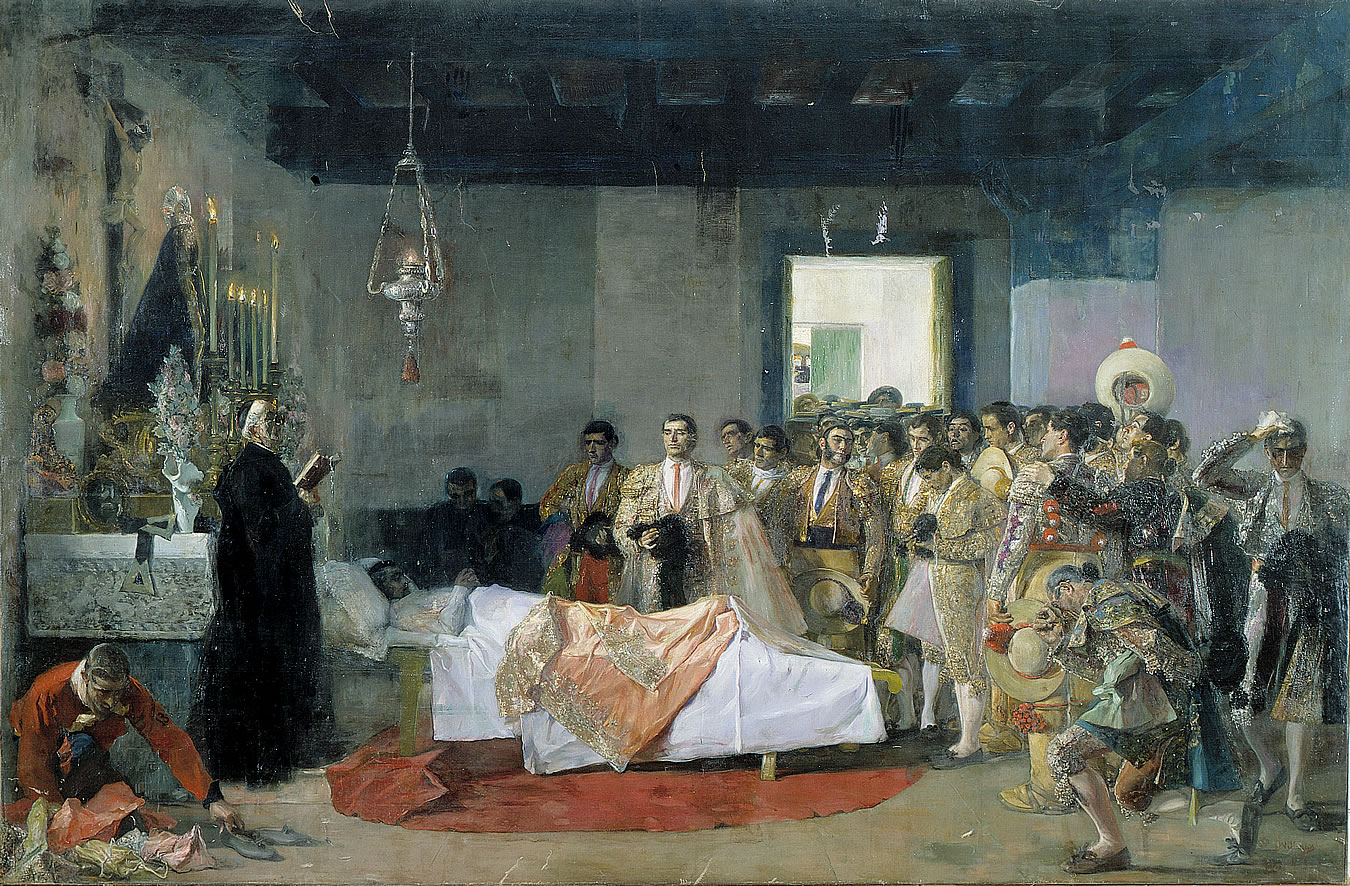
Muerte del Maestro (Death of the Master) – José Villegas Cordero, 1884

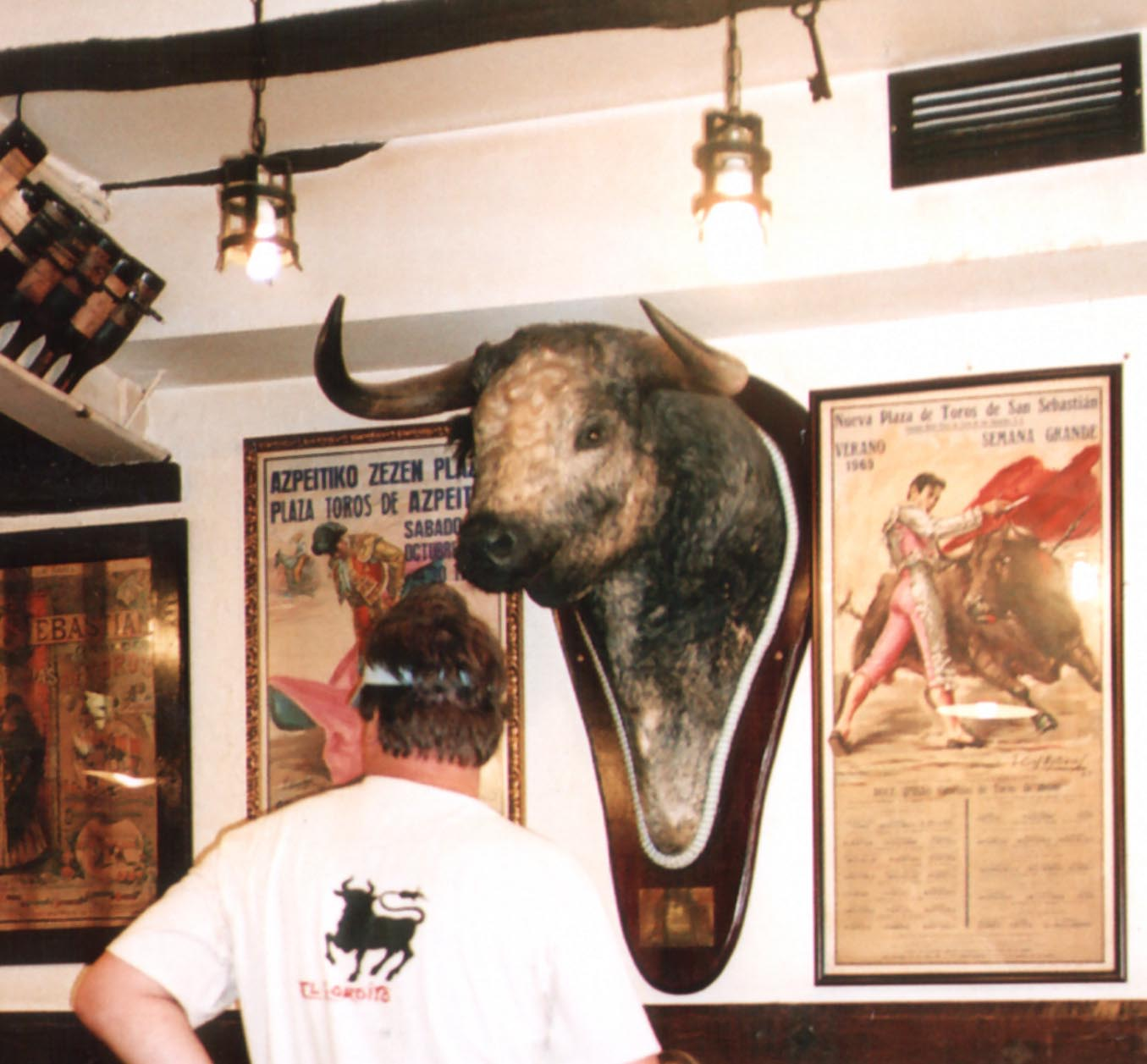
Stuffed bull head in a bar in San Sebastián

Spanish-style bullfighting is usually fatal for the bull, and it is also dangerous for the matador. Matadors are usually gored every season, with picadors and banderilleros being gored less often. With the discovery of antibiotics and advances in surgical techniques, fatalities are now rare, although over the past three centuries 534 professional bullfighters have died in the ring or from injuries sustained there. Most recently, Iván Fandiño died of injuries he sustained after being gored by a bull on 17 June 2017 in Aire-sur-l'Adour, France.

Some matadors, notably Juan Belmonte, have been seriously gored many times: according to Ernest Hemingway, Belmonte's legs were marred by many ugly scars. The Sanatorio de los Toreros in Madrid is a hospital that specialises in treating the cornadas, or horn-wounds, of matadors.

The bullring has a chapel where a matador can pray before the corrida, and where a priest can be found in case a sacrament is needed. The most relevant sacrament is now called "Anointing of the Sick"; it was formerly known as "Extreme Unction", or the "Last Rites".

The media often reports the more horrific of bullfighting injuries, such as the September 2011 goring of matador Juan José Padilla's head by a bull in Zaragoza, resulting in the loss of his left eye, use of his right ear, and facial paralysis. He returned to bullfighting five months later with an eyepatch, multiple titanium plates in his skull, and the nickname 'The Pirate'.

Until the early twentieth century, the horses were unprotected and were commonly gored and killed, or left close to death (intestines destroyed, for example). The horses used were old and worn-out, with little value. Starting in the twentieth-century horses were protected by thick blankets and wounds, though not unknown, were less common and less serious.

However, the danger lurks not only from a bull, but also from other causes, such as too weak infrastructure. One of such cases happened in 2022 in Colombia, when several people were killed and more than 300 were injured after a stand collapsed during the bullfight. The incident happened in El Espinal, Tolima, in central Colombia.

== Cultural aspects ==
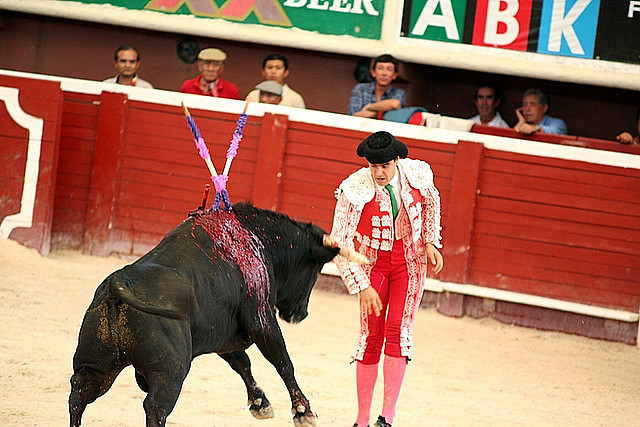
A matador evading a bull in Cancún, Mexico, 2012

Many supporters of bullfighting regard it as a deeply ingrained, integral part of their national cultures; in Spain, bullfighting is nicknamed la fiesta nacional ("the national fiesta"). (Note: Notice that "fiesta" can be translated as celebration, festival, party, among other words.) The aesthetic of bullfighting is based on the interaction of the man and the bull. Rather than a competitive sport, the bullfight is more of a ritual of ancient origin, which is judged by aficionados based on artistic impression and command.

American author Ernest Hemingway wrote of it in his 1932 non-fiction book Death in the Afternoon: "Bullfighting is the only art in which the artist is in danger of death and in which the degree of brilliance in the performance is left to the fighter's honor." Bullfighting is seen by some as a symbol of Spanish national culture.

The bullfight is regarded as a demonstration of style, technique, and courage by its participants and as a demonstration of cruelty and cowardice by its critics. While there is usually no doubt about the outcome, the bull is not viewed by bullfighting supporters as a sacrificial victim — it is instead seen by the audience as a worthy adversary, deserving of respect in its own right.

Those who oppose bullfighting maintain that the practice is a sadistic tradition of torturing and killing a bull amidst pomp and pageantry. Supporters of bullfights, called "aficionados", claim to respect the bulls, that the bulls live better than other cattle, and that bullfighting is a grand tradition, a form of art important to their culture.

== Women in bullfighting ==
In nineteenth-century Spain, Martina García stood out among female bullfighters as one of the few who sometimes fought bulls alongside men. One of the most notable toreras of the early 20th century was La Reverte. After Spanish government banned women in bullfighting in 1908, La Reverte claimed to have been assigned male at birth, and fought alongside men as one of them.

Conchita Cintrón was a Peruvian female bullfighter who began her career in Portugal before being active in Mexican and South American bullfights. Patricia McCormick began bullfighting as a professional Matadora in January 1952, and was the first American to do so. Bette Ford was the first American woman to fight on foot in the Plaza México, the world's largest bullfight arena.

In 1974, Ángela Hernández (also known as Ángela Hernández Gómez and just Ángela), of Spain, won a case in the Spanish Supreme Court allowing women to be bullfighters in Spain; a prohibition against women doing so was put in place in Spain in 1908. Cristina Sánchez de Pablos, of Spain, gained prominence during the 1990s for being one of the first female bullfighters.

In 2018, Japanese bullfighting organizers lifted a ban on women entering the bullfighting ring.

== Popularity, controversy, and criticism ==
=== Popularity ===
In Spain and Latin America, opposition to bullfighting is referred to as the antitaurino movement. In a 2012 poll, 70% of Mexican respondents wanted bullfighting to be prohibited.

==== France ====
Are you in favour of banning bullfighting in France or not?
% response	Sep 2007	Aug 2010	Feb 2018
In favour	50	66	74
Not in favour	50	34	26

A February 2018 study commissioned by the 30 millions d'amis foundation and conducted by the Institut français d'opinion publique (IFOP) found that 74% of the French wanted to prohibit bullfighting in France, with 26% opposed. In September 2007, these percentages were still 50-50, with those favouring a ban growing to 66% in August 2010 and those opposed shrinking to 34%. The survey found a correlation between age and opinion; younger survey participants were more likely to support a ban.

==== Spain ====
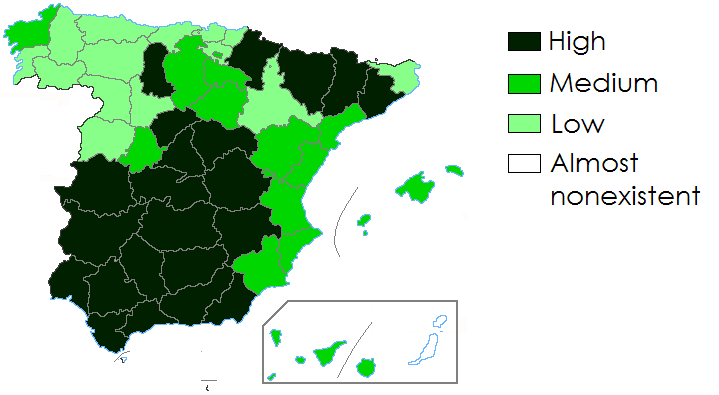
Prevalence of bullfighting across Spanish provinces during the 19th century

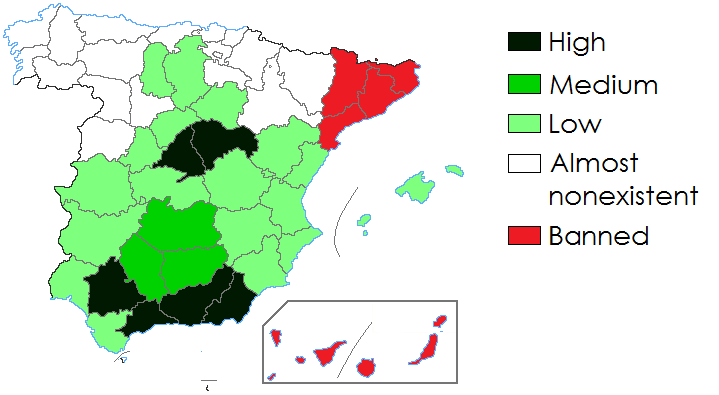
Prevalence of bullfighting across Spanish provinces as of 2012

Despite its slow decrease in popularity among younger generations, bullfighting remains a widespread cultural activity throughout Spain. A 2016 poll reported that 58% of Spaniards aged 16 to 65 opposed bullfighting against 19% who supported it. The support was lower among the younger population, with only 7% of respondents aged 16 to 24 supporting bullfighting, vs. 29% support within 55 to 65 age group. According to the same poll 67% of respondents felt "little to not at all" proud to live in a country where bullfighting was a cultural tradition (84% among 16 to 24 age group).

Between 2007 and 2014, the number of corridas held in Spain decreased by 60%. In 2007 there were 3,651 bullfighting and bull-related events in Spain but by 2018, the number of bullfights had decreased to 1,521, a historic low. A September 2019 Spanish government report showed that only 8% of the population had attended a bull-related event in 2018; of this percentage, 5.9% attended a bullfight while the remainder attended other bull-related events, such as the running of the bulls. When asked to gauge their interest in bullfighting on a scale of 0 through 10, only 5.9% responded with 9–10. A majority of 65% of responded with 0–2; among those aged 15–19, this figure was 72.1%, and for those aged 20–24, it reached 76.4%. With a fall in attendance, the bullfighting sector has come under financial stress, as many local authorities have reduced subsidies because of public criticism.

Should bullfighting be banned [in Spain]?
% response	May 2020
Yes	52
No	35
Don't know / Refused answer	10 / 2

When the COVID-19 pandemic hit Spain and the country entered into lockdown in March 2020, all bullfighting events were cancelled indefinitely. In mid-May 2020, the bullfighting industry, like other sectors of Spanish economy, demanded that the government compensate them for their losses, estimated at €700 million. This prompted outrage, and more than 100,000 people signed a petition launched by AnimaNaturalis urging the government not to rescue "spectacles based on the abuse and mistreatment of animals" with taxpayer money at a time when people were struggling to survive and public finances were already heavily strained. A 29–31 May 2020 YouGov survey commissioned by HuffPost showed that 52% of the 1,001 Spaniards questioned wanted to ban bullfighting, 35% were opposed, 10% did not know and 2% refused to answer. A strong majority of 78% answered that corridas should no longer be partially subsidised by the government, with 12% favoring subsidies and 10% undecided. When asked whether bullfighting was culture or mistreatment, 40% replied that it is mistreatment alone, 18% replied that it is culture alone and 37% replied that it is both. Of the respondents, 53% had never attended a corrida.

==== Peru ====
Outside of Spain, the country in which bullfighting has enjoyed the most popularity today is Peru. The Plaza de toros de Acho, the oldest bullring in the Americas and second oldest in the world after La Maestranza in Spain (not counting the Roman Empire-era Arles Amphitheatre in France), serves as the premier bullring in the country and is classified as a national historic monument. The bullfighting fair held in honor of the annual Señor de los Milagros festival takes place at the plaza on Sundays through October and November. During the fair, Lima brings in some of the world's most lauded talent (the bill for 2019 included Andrés Roca Rey, Sebastian Castella, and José Mari Manzanares) The best bullfighter of the year is awarded the Escapulario de Oro (Golden Scapular), while the Escapulario de Plata (Silver Scapular) goes to the provider of the best bull. Sometimes either or both scapulars may go not awarded.

==== Costa Rica ====
The most famous bull in Costa Rica was named Malacrianza, and he was responsible for the deaths of two riders; he killed one in 2005 and another in 2006. Malacrianza was credited with revitalizing the popularity of bullfighting in Costa Rica, as the sport was declining in popularity prior to his debut, but the widespread media coverage of the deaths he caused generated nationwide interest.

=== Animal welfare ===
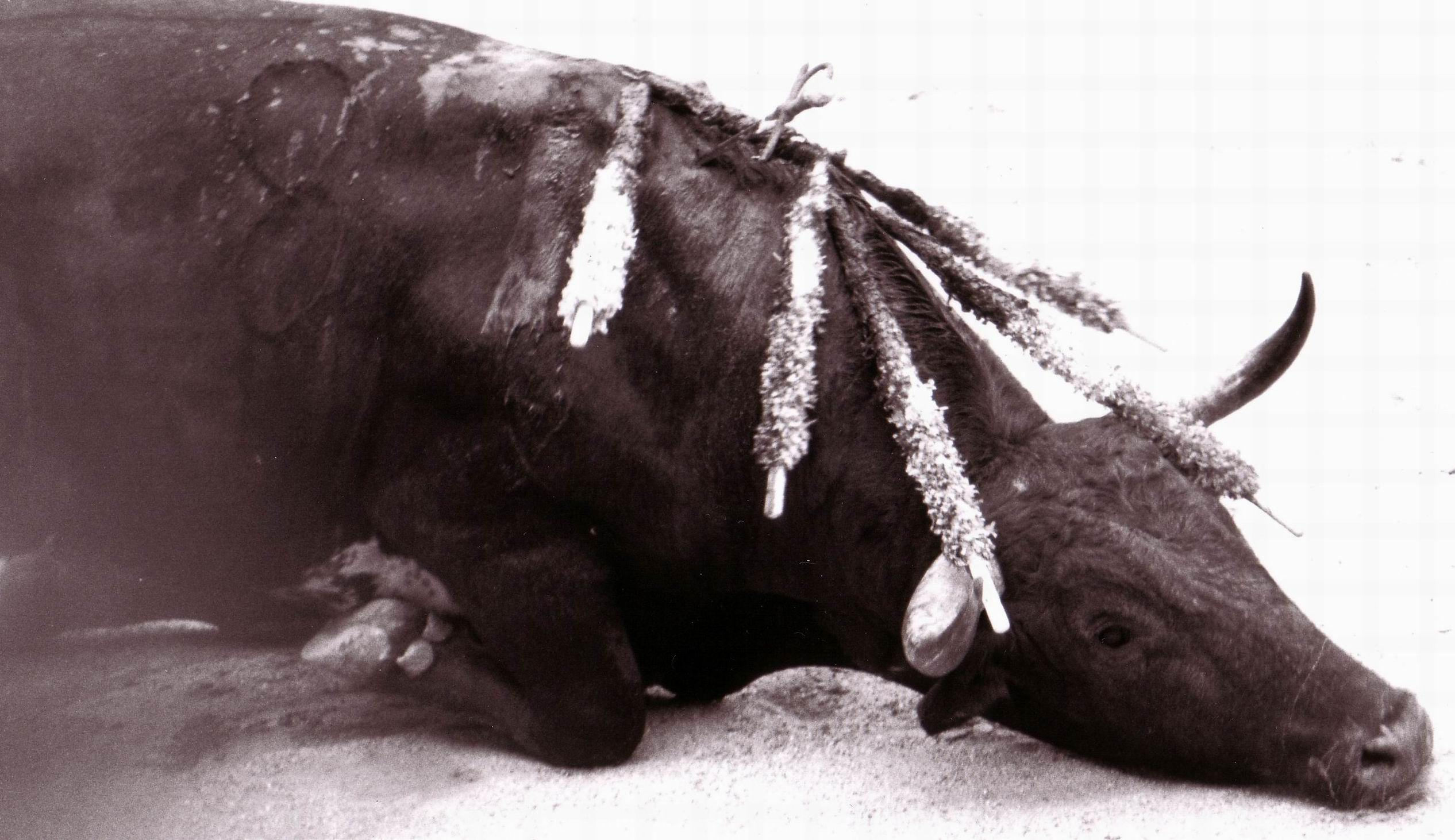
Bull dying in a bullfight

RSPCA assistant director for public affairs David Bowles said: "The RSPCA is strongly opposed to bullfighting. It is an inhumane and outdated practice that continues to lose support, including from those living in the countries where this takes place such as Spain, Portugal and France."

The bullfighting guide The Bulletpoint Bullfight warns that bullfighting is "not for the squeamish," advising spectators to "be prepared for blood." The guide details prolonged and profuse bleeding caused by horse-mounted lancers, the charging by the bull of a blindfolded, armored horse who is "sometimes doped up, and unaware of the proximity of the bull", the placing of barbed darts by banderilleros and the matador's fatal sword thrust. The guide stresses that these procedures are a normal part of bullfighting and that death is rarely instantaneous. The guide further warns those attending bullfights to "Be prepared to witness various failed attempts at killing the animal before it lies down."

Alexander Fiske-Harrison, who trained as a bullfighter to research for his book on the topic, has pointed out that some bulls live three times longer than do cattle reared exclusively for meat, and live wild during that period in meadows and forests that are funded by the premium the bullfight's box office adds on to the price of their meat. This should be taken into account when weighing concerns about both animal welfare and the environment. He also speculated that the adrenalizing nature of the 30-minute spectacle possibly may reduce the bull's suffering even below that of the stress and anxiety of queueing in the abattoir. However, zoologist and animal rights activist Jordi Casamitjana argues that the bulls do experience a high degree of suffering and "all aspects of any bullfight, from the transport to the death, are in themselves causes of suffering."

=== Funding ===
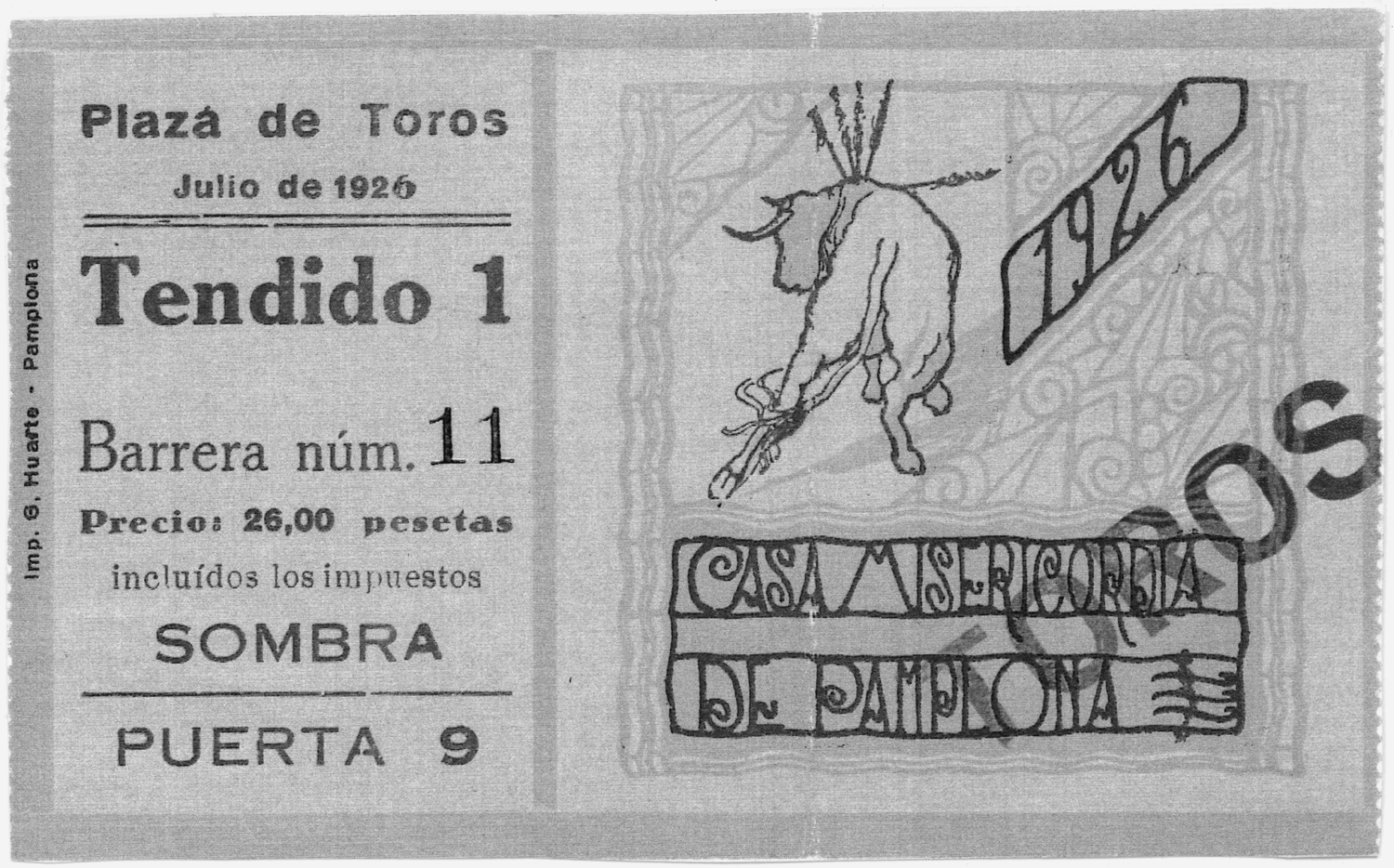
A ticket stub from 1926

The question of public funding is particularly controversial in Spain, since widely disparaged claims have been made by supporters and opponents of bullfighting. According to government figures, bullfighting in Spain generates €1.6 billion a year and 200,000 jobs, 57,000 of which are directly linked to the industry. Furthermore, bullfighting is the cultural activity that generates the most tax revenue for the Spanish state (€45 million in VAT and over €12 million in social security).

Critics often claim that bullfighting is financed with public money. However, though bullfighting attracts 25 million spectators annually, it represents just 0.01% of state subsidies allocated to cultural activities, and less than 3% of the cultural budget of regional, provincial and local authorities. The bulk of subsidies is paid by town halls in localities where there is a historical tradition and support for bullfighting and related events, which are often held free of charge to participants and spectators. The European Union does not subsidize bullfighting but it does subsidize cattle farming in general, which also benefits those who rear Spanish fighting bulls.

In 2015, 438 of 687 members of the European Parliament voted in favour of amending the 2016 E.U. budget to indicate that the "Common Agricultural Policy (CAP) appropriations or any other appropriations from the budget should not be used for the financing of lethal bullfighting activities."

=== Politics ===
In the late 19th and early 20th century, some Spanish regeneracionista intellectuals protested against what they called the policy of pan y toros ("bread and bulls"), an analogue of Roman panem et circenses. Such belief was part of the wider current of thought known as anti-flamenquismo, a campaign against the popularity of both bullfighting and flamenco music, which were believed to be "oriental" elements of Spanish culture that were responsible for Spain's perceived culture gap compared to the rest of Europe. In Francoist Spain, bullfights received great governmental support, as they were considered a demonstration of greatness of the Spanish nation and received the name of fiesta nacional. Bullfighting was therefore highly associated with the regime. After Spain's transition to democracy, popular support for bullfighting declined.

Opposition to bullfighting from Spain's political parties is typically highest among those on the left. PSOE, the main left-wing political party, has distanced itself from bullfighting but refuses to ban it, while Spain's far-left political party Podemos has repeatedly called for referendums on the matter and has shown disapproval of the practise. PP, the largest conservative party, strongly supports bullfighting and has requested large public subsidies for it. The government of José Luis Rodríguez Zapatero was the first to oppose bullfighting, prohibiting children under 14 from attending events and imposing a six-year ban on live bullfights broadcast on state-run national television, although the latter measure was reversed after Zapatero's party lost in the 2011 elections.

Despite its long history in Barcelona, bullfighting was outlawed across the Catalonia region in 2010 following a campaign led by an animal-rights civic platform called "Prou!" ("Enough!" in Catalan). Critics have argued that the ban was motivated by issues of Catalan separatism and identity politics. In October 2016, the Constitutional Court ruled that the regional Catalan Parliament did not have the authority to ban events that are legal in Spain.

The Spanish Royal Family is divided on the issue. Former queen consort Sofía of Spain disapproves of bullfights, but former king Juan Carlos I occasionally presided over bullfights from the royal box. Their daughter Princess Elena is well-known for her support of the practice and often attends bullfights.

Pro-bullfighting supporters include former prime minister Mariano Rajoy and his party (Partido Popular), as well as most leaders of the opposition PSOE party, including former prime minister Felipe Gonzalez and the current presidents of Andalusia, Extremadura and Castilla–La Mancha.

As of 2025, the Congress of Mexico City voted to ban traditional bullfighting and replace it with a new form of entertainment involving bulls that does not result in their death. This decision followed a citizen-led initiative calling for a ban on bullfighting in the city.

=== Religion ===
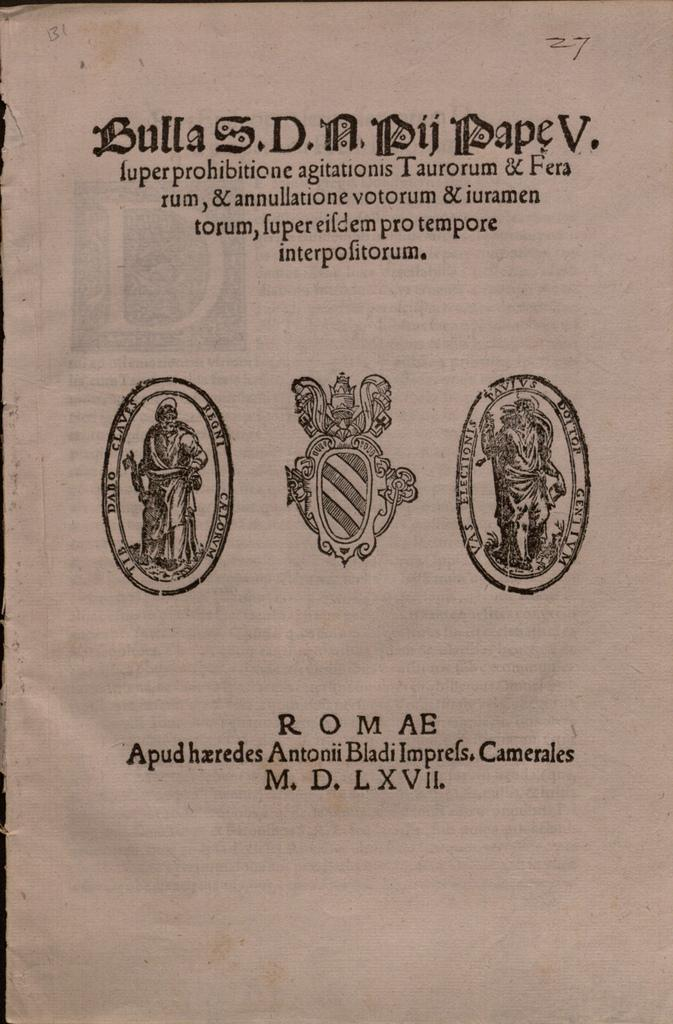
Pope Pius V's bull against bullfighting and other blood sports involving wild animals (1567)

Bullfighting is thought to have been practised since prehistoric times throughout the entire Mediterranean coast, but it survives only in Iberia and in part of France. During the Muslim rule of Iberia, the ruling class tried to ban bullfighting, considering it a pagan celebration and heresy. In the 16th century, Pope Pius V banned bullfighting for its ties to paganism and for the danger that it posed to the participants. Anyone who would sponsor, watch or participate in a bullfight was to be excommunicated by the church. Spanish and Portuguese bullfighters kept the tradition alive covertly, and Pius's successor Pope Gregory XIII relaxed the church's position. However, Pope Gregory advised bullfighters to not use the sport as means of honoring Jesus Christ or the saints, as was typical in Spain and Portugal. For example, in Braga, one of the most important religious cities in Portugal, bullfighting was so common to celebrate holy days that one of the main squares of the city, then named the Praça dos Arcebispos (Archbishop's Square), was nicknamed the Campo dos Touros (Field of Bulls). These events happened with the full support of both the city's elite and the populace, with the Archbishop of Braga presiding over the events.

Although Pope Francis's statement that "every act of cruelty towards any creature is 'contrary to human dignity'", in his 2015 encyclical letter, Laudato si', does not mention bullfighting as such, it has been taken as supporting religious opposition to bullfighting.

Bullfighting has been intertwined with religion and religious folklore in Spain at a popular level, particularly in the areas in which it has been most popular. Bullfighting events are celebrated during festivities celebrating local patron saints, along with other activities, games and sports. The bullfighting world is also inextricably linked to iconography related to religious devotion in Spain, with bullfighters seeking the protection of Mary and often becoming members of religious brotherhoods.

=== Media prohibitions ===
State-run Spanish TVE had cancelled live coverage of bullfights in August 2007 until September 2012, claiming that the coverage was too violent for children and that live coverage violated a voluntary, industry-wide code attempting to limit "sequences that are particularly crude or brutal." In an October 2008 statement to Congress, Luis Fernández, the president of Spanish state broadcaster TVE, confirmed that the station would no longer broadcast live bullfights because of high production costs and a lack of advertiser support. However, the station continued to broadcast Tendido Cero, a bullfighting magazine programme. Other regional and private channels kept broadcasting it with good audiences. Prime Minister Mariano Rajoy's government lifted the ban, and live bullfights were shown at the traditional 6:00 p.m. time on TVE in the early 2010s. Since the 2020s, TVE has broadcast live bullfights only infrequently, and it is transmitted regularly by broadcasters in only five autonomous communities.

A television station in Costa Rica stopped the broadcast of bullfights in January 2008 over concerns that they were too violent for minors.

=== Declaration as cultural patrimony ===
A growing list of Spanish, Portuguese and South American cities and regions have formally declared their bullfighting celebrations as part of their protected cultural patrimony or heritage. Most of these declarations have been enacted in reaction to the 2010 ban in Catalonia. In April 2012, the Andalusian city of Seville declared bullfighting to be part of the city's cultural heritage.

== Laws ==
=== Pre-20th century ===
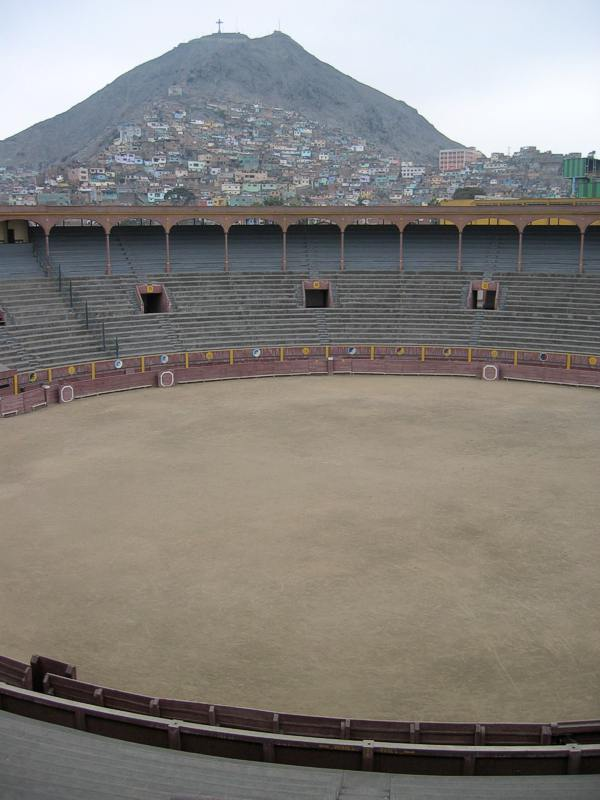
Plaza de toros de Acho in Lima, Peru—the oldest bullring in South America, dating back to 1766

In November 1567, Pope Pius V issued a papal bull titled De Salute Gregis forbidding the fighting of bulls and other beasts as a voluntary risk to life which endangered the soul of the combatants. However it was rescinded eight years later by his successor, Pope Gregory XIII, at the request of King Philip II.

Chile banned bullfighting shortly after gaining independence in 1818, but the Chilean rodeo (which involves horseriders in an oval arena blocking a female cow against the wall without killing it) is still legal and has even been declared a national sport.

Bullfighting was introduced in Uruguay in 1776 by Spain and abolished by Uruguayan law in February 1912; thus the Plaza de toros Real de San Carlos, built in 1910, only operated for two years. Bullfighting was also introduced in Argentina by Spain, but after Argentina's independence, the event drastically diminished in popularity and was abolished in 1899 under law 2786.

Bullfighting was present in Cuba during its colonial period from 1514 to 1898, but was abolished by the United States military under the pressure of civic associations in 1899, right after the Spanish–American War of 1898. The prohibition was maintained after Cuba gained independence in 1902. Bullfighting was also banned for a period in Mexico in 1890; consequently some Spanish bullfighters moved to the United States to transfer their skills to the American rodeos.

During the 18th and 19th centuries, bullfighting in Spain was banned at several occasions (for instance by Philip V), but always reinstituted later by other governments.

In Portugal, bullfighting was prohibited in several occasions with the tendency of following catholic religious law and, therefore, the Pope's legislative view of the issue. In 1779, King Joseph I of Portugal, presiding at an event in Salvaterra de Magos, attempted to ban the practice after having witnessed the tragic death of the son of Pedro José de Meneses, IV Marquis of Marialva, during a bullfight. Instead, the practice of dulling or trimming the bull's horns was introduced.

Bullfighting had some popularity in the Philippines during Spanish rule, though foreign commentators derided the quality of local bulls and toreros. Bullfighting was noted in the Philippines as early as 1619, when it was among the festivities in celebration of Pope Urban III's authorisation of the Feast of the Immaculate Conception. Following the Spanish–American War, the Americans suppressed the custom in the Philippines under the tenure of Governor General Leonard Wood, and it was replaced with a now-popular Filipino sport, basketball.

=== 20th century onwards ===
Which countries have banned bullfighting

Bullfighting is now banned in many countries; people taking part in such activity would be liable for terms of imprisonment for animal cruelty. "Bloodless" variations, though, are often permitted and have attracted a following in California, Texas, and France. In southern France, however, the traditional form of the corrida still exists and it is protected by French law. However, in June 2015 the Paris Court of Appeals removed bullfighting/"la corrida" from France's cultural heritage list. While it is not very popular in Texas, bloodless forms of bullfighting occur at rodeos in small Texas towns.

Several cities around the world (especially in Catalonia) have symbolically declared themselves to be Anti-Bullfighting Cities, including Barcelona in 2006.

=== Colombia ===
The issue of bullfighting has been controversial and problematic in Colombia in recent years. Bullfighting with killing bulls in the ring is legal in Colombia. In 2013, Gustavo Petro, then mayor of the Colombian capital city of Bogotá, had de facto prohibited bullfighting by refusing to lease out bullrings to bullfighting organisers. But the Constitutional Court of Colombia ruled that this violated the right to expression of the bullfighters, and ordered the bullrings to be reopened. The first bullfight in Bogotá in four years happened on 22 January 2017 amid clashes between antitaurino protesters and police. Petro, who was elected as president of Colombia in 2022, promised in his campaign to end any show involving animals.

After a bullring collapse in June 2022 occurred in the municipality of El Espinal in the Tolima department, resulting in the deaths of four people and injured hundreds, opened a new debate on the legality and safety of the corralejas and bullfights throughout the country. A bill presented that year on 21 July by Deputy Juan Carlos Lozada, from the Liberal Party, was approved by the First Commission of the Chamber in the first debate, and is based on eliminating bullfighting practices in the national territory. However, the bill foundered when it was passed to Congress. Animalists questioned the lack of support from the progressive bench.

In the early hours of 15 December, after several hours of hard debate between the government and opposition benches, the Senate of the Republic approved in a second debate the project of Law 085 of 2022, proposed by Senator Andrea Padilla of the Alianza Verde, which seeks a ban on bullfights in Colombia. However, consensus was achieved by leaving out the prohibition of cockfighting and corralejas, key points of the initiative. As of 26 December 2022, the proposal goes to the third debate, which will take place in the House of Representatives. The law seeks to eventually weed out bullfighting in the country in the next three years, while it stamps out practices of killing the bulls in the arena, attacking them with pikes or handheld harpoons.

Supporters have stated that the measures would kill the tradition, which has existed in the country for generations, and that it is still a popular form of entertainment in rural areas and an art form.

In May 2024, the Congress of Colombia adopted a bill to ban bullfighting across the country from the year 2027 onwards.

=== Costa Rica ===
In Costa Rica the law prohibits the killing of bulls and other animals in public and private shows. However, there are still bullfights, called "Toros a la Tica", that are televised from Palmares and Zapote at the end and beginning of the year. Volunteer amateur bullfighters (improvisados) confront a bull in a ring and try to provoke him into charging and then run away. In a December 2016 survey, 46.4% of respondents wanted to outlaw bullfights while 50.1% thought they should continue. Costa Rican bullfights may also involve trying to subdue the bull by riding it to exhaustion.

=== Ecuador ===
Ecuador staged bullfights to the death for over three centuries as a Spanish colony. On 12 December 2010, Ecuador's president Rafael Correa announced that in an upcoming referendum, the country would be asked whether to ban bullfighting; in the referendum, held in May 2011, the Ecuadorians agreed on banning the final killing of the bull that happens in a corrida. This means the bull is no longer killed before the public, and is instead taken back inside the barn to be killed at the end of the event. The other parts of the corrida are still performed the same way as before in the cities that celebrate it. This part of the referendum is applied on a regional level, meaning that in regions where the population voted against the ban, which are the same regions where bullfighting is celebrated the most, killing the animal publicly in the bullfighting plaza is still performed. The main bullfighting celebration of the country, the Fiesta Brava in Quito was still allowed to take place in December 2011 after the referendum under these new rules.

=== France ===
In 1951, bullfighting in France was legalised by §7 of Article 521-1 of the French penal code in areas where there was an 'unbroken local tradition'. This exemption applies to Nîmes, Arles, Alès, Bayonne, Carcassonne, and Fréjus, amongst others. In 2011, the French Ministry of Culture added corrida to the list of 'intangible heritage' of France, but after much controversy silently removed it from its website again. Animal rights activists launched a lawsuit to make sure it was completely removed from the heritage list and thus not given extra legal protection; the Administrative Appeals Court of Paris ruled in their favour in June 2015. In a separate case, the Constitutional Council ruled on 21 September 2012 that bullfighting did not violate the French Constitution.

=== Honduras ===
In Honduras, under Article 11 of 'Decree no. 115-2015 ─ Animal Protection and Welfare Act' that went into effect in 2016, dog and cat fights and duck races are prohibited, while 'bullfighting shows and cockfights are part of the National Folklore and as such allowed'. However, 'in bullfighting shows, the use of spears, swords, fire or other objects that cause pain to the animal is prohibited.'

=== India ===
Jallikattu, a type of bull-taming or bull-riding event, is practiced in the Indian state of Tamil Nadu. A bull is released into a crowd of people. Participants attempt to grab the bull's hump and either hold on for a determined distance or length of time or attempt to liberate a packet of money tied to the bull's horns. The practice was banned in 2014 by India's Supreme Court over concerns that bulls are sometimes mistreated prior to jallikattu events. Animal welfare investigations into the practice revealed that some bulls are poked with sticks and scythes, some have their tails twisted, some are force-fed alcohol to disorient them, and in some cases chili powder and other irritants are applied to bulls' eyes and genitals to agitate the animals. The 2014 ban was suspended and reinstated several times over the years. In January 2017, the Supreme Court upheld their previous ban and various protests arose in response. Due to these protests, on 21 January 2017, the Governor of Tamil Nadu issued a new ordinance that authorized the continuation of jallikattu events. On 23 January 2017 the Tamil Nadu legislature passed a bi-partisan bill, with the accession of the Prime Minister, exempting jallikattu from the Prevention of Cruelty to Animals Act (1960). As of January 2017 Jallikattu is legal in Tamil Nadu, but another organization may challenge the mechanism by which it was legalized, as the Animal Welfare Board of India claims that the Tamil Nadu Legislative Assembly does not have the power to override Indian federal law, meaning that the state law could possibly once again be nullified and jallikattu banned.

=== Mexico ===
Bullfighting has been banned in 5 of the 31 states of Mexico: Sonora in 2013, Guerrero in 2014, Coahuila in 2015, Quintana Roo in 2019, and Sinaloa in 2022. It was also banned "indefinitely" in Mexico City in 2022, but resumed on 29 January 2024 after a series of legal challenges. In 2025 lawmakers in Mexico City voted overwhelmingly to prohibit the killing of bulls and the use of swords and other sharp objects that could injure them.

=== Panama ===
Law 308 on the Protection of Animals was approved by the National Assembly of Panama on 15 March 2012. Article 7 of the law states: 'Dog fights, animal races, bullfights – whether of the Spanish or Portuguese style – the breeding, entry, permanence and operation in the national territory of all kinds of circus or circus show that uses trained animals of any species, are prohibited.' Horse racing and cockfighting were exempt from the ban.

=== Nicaragua ===
Nicaragua prohibited bullfighting under a new Animal Welfare Law in December 2010, with 74 votes in favour and 5 votes against in Parliament.

=== Portugal ===
Queen Maria II of Portugal prohibited bullfighting in 1836 with the argument that it was unbefitting for a civilised nation. The ban was lifted in 1921, but in 1928 a law was passed that forbade the killing of the bull during a fight. In practice, bulls still frequently die after a fight from their injuries or by being slaughtered by a butcher.

In 2001, matador Pedrito de Portugal controversially killed a bull at the end of a fight after spectators encouraged him to do so by chanting "Kill the bull! Kill the bull!" The crowds gave Pedrito a standing ovation, hoisted him on their shoulders and paraded him through the streets. Hours later the police arrested him and charged him with a fine, but they released him after crowds of angry fans surrounded the police station. A long court case ensued, finally resulting in Pedrito's conviction in 2007 with a fine of €100,000. In 2002, the Portuguese government gave Barrancos, a village near the Spanish border where bullfighting fans stubbornly persisted in encouraging the killing of bulls during fights, a dispensation from the 1928 ban.

Various attempts have been made to ban bullfighting in Portugal, both nationally (in 2012 and 2018) and locally, but so far unsuccessful. In July 2018, animalist party PAN presented a proposal at the Portuguese Parliament to abolish all types of bullfighting in the country. Left-wing party Left Bloc voted in favour of the proposal but criticised its lack of solutions to the foreseen consequences of the abolition. The proposal was however categorically rejected by all other parties, that cited freedom of choice and respect for tradition as arguments against it.

=== Spain ===
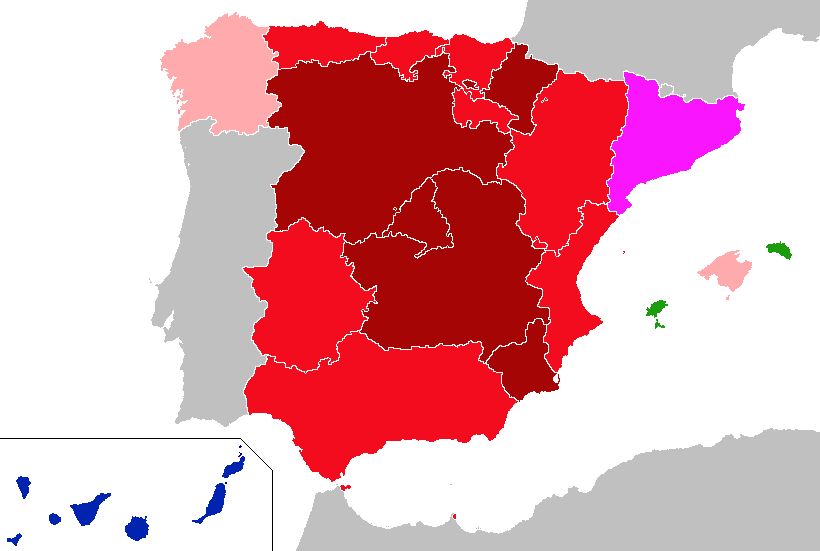
Legal situation of bullfighting in Spain in 2015 (overturned in 2016)ː Bullfighting banned. Bullfighting legal, but traditionally not practiced. Bullfighting banned, but other spectacles involving cattle protected by law. Bullfighting legal, but banned in some places. Bullfighting legal. Bullfighting legal and protected by law (declared as Cultural Interest or Intangible Cultural Heritage).

The parliament of the autonomous community of Catalonia voted in favour of a ban on bullfighting in 2009, which went into effect in 2012. The Spanish national parliament passed a law in 2013 stating that bullfighting is an 'indisputable' part of Spain's 'cultural heritage'; this law was used by the Spanish Constitutional Court in 2016 to overturn the Catalan ban of 2012. When the island of Mallorca adopted a law in 2017 that prohibited the killing of a bull during a fight, this law was also declared partially unconstitutional by the Spanish Constitutional Court in 2018, as the judges ruled that the death of the bull was part of the essence of a corrida.

==== Canary Islands ====
In 1991, the Canary Islands became the first Spanish Autonomous Community to ban bullfighting, when they legislated to ban spectacles that involve cruelty to animals, with the exception of cockfighting, which is traditional in some towns in the Islands; bullfighting was never popular in the Canary Islands. Some supporters of bullfighting and even Lorenzo Olarte Cullen, Canarian head of government at the time, have argued that the fighting bull is not a "domestic animal" and hence the law does not ban bullfighting. The absence of spectacles since 1984 would be due to lack of demand. In the rest of Spain, national laws against cruelty to animals have abolished most blood sports, but specifically exempt bullfighting.

==== Catalonia ====
On 18 December 2009, the parliament of Catalonia, one of Spain's seventeen Autonomous Communities, approved by majority the preparation of a law to ban bullfighting in Catalonia, as a response to a popular initiative against bullfighting that gathered more than 180,000 signatures. On 28 July 2010, with the two main parties allowing their members a free vote, the ban was passed 68 to 55, with 9 abstentions. This meant Catalonia became the second Community of Spain (first was Canary Islands in 1991), and the first on the mainland, to ban bullfighting. The ban took effect on 1 January 2012, and affected only the one remaining functioning Catalan bullring, the Plaza de toros Monumental de Barcelona. It did not affect the correbous, a traditional game of the Ebro area (south of Catalonia) where lighted flares are attached to a bull's horns. The correbous are seen mainly in the municipalities in the south of Tarragona, with the exceptions of a few other towns in other provinces of Catalonia. The name correbous is essentially Catalan and Valencian; in other parts of Spain they have other names.

A movement emerged to revoke the ban in the Spanish congress, citing the value of bullfighting as "cultural heritage". The proposal was backed by the majority of parliamentarians in 2013.

In October 2016 the Spanish Constitutional Court ruled that the regional Catalan Parliament had no competence to ban any kind of spectacle that is legal in Spain.

==== Galicia ====
In Galicia, bullfighting has never had an important following. Galicia, Better Without Bullfights is an anti-bullfighting organization founded in 2008, aiming to eliminate the few bullfights that still occur in the region. According to a Gallup poll, 86% of Galicians reject or dislike bullfighting, representing one of the highest rates of opposition to bullfighting in Spain. As of 2018, 19 Galician municipalities have joined the Rede de Municipios Galegos pola Abolición, while the provinces of A Coruña and Pontevedra (in total 155 municipalities) abolished subsidies for bullfighting activities.

=== United States ===
Bullfighting was outlawed in California in 1957, but the law was amended in response to protests from the Portuguese community in Gustine. Lawmakers determined that a form of "bloodless" bullfighting would be allowed to continue, in affiliation with certain Christian holidays. Though the bull is not killed as with traditional bullfighting, it is still intentionally irritated and provoked and its horns are shaved down to prevent injury to people and other animals present in the ring, but serious injuries still can and do occur and spectators are also at risk. The Humane Society of the United States has expressed opposition to bullfighting in all its forms since at least 1981.

Puerto Rico banned bullfighting and the breeding of bulls for fights by Law no. 176 of 25 July 1998.

== In literature, film, and the arts ==
- Ferdinand the Bull (film)

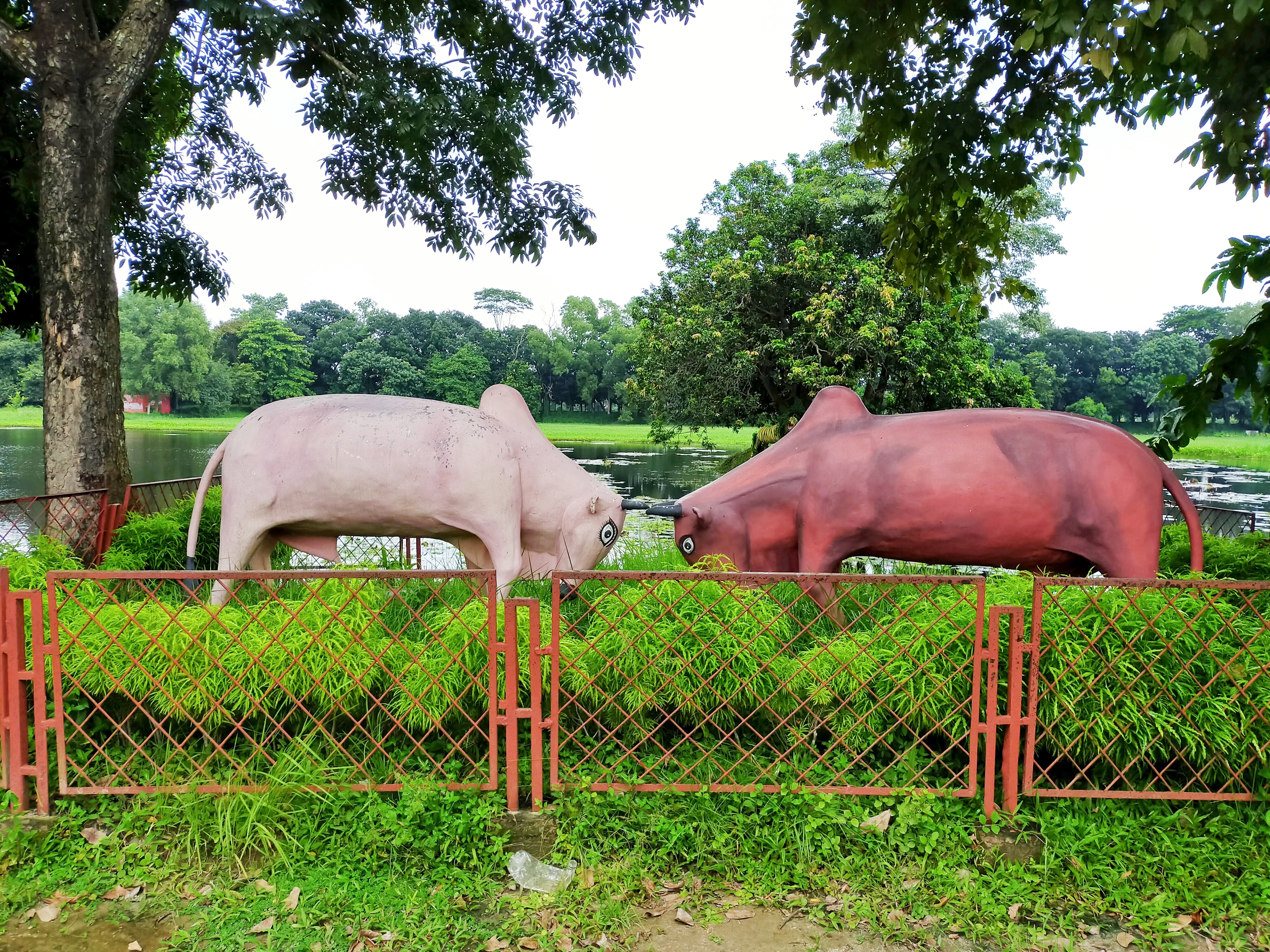
Bullfighting statue at Shilpacharya Zainul Abedin Folk Arts and Crafts Museum, Bangladesh

- The opera Carmen features a bullfighter as a major character, a well-known song about him, and a bullfight off-stage at the climax.
- The Sun Also Rises, a novel by Ernest Hemingway, includes many accounts of bullfighting.
- Death in the Afternoon, Ernest Hemingway's treatise on Spanish bullfighting.
- The Dangerous Summer, Ernest Hemingway's chronicle of the bullfighting rivalry between Luis Miguel Dominguín and his brother-in-law Antonio Ordóñez.
- Llanto por Ignacio Sánchez Mejías ("Lament for Ignacio Sánchez Mejías", 1935), a poem by Federico García Lorca.
- Blood and Sand, a movie starring Tyrone Power and Rita Hayworth.
- What's the Matador? (1941), a Three Stooges short set where Moe, Larry, and Curly travel to Mexico to perform their bullfighting-themed comedy routine. Later remade with Joe Besser as Sappy Bull Fighters (1959).
- Ricardo Montalbán portrayed bullfighters in Santa (1943), The Hour of Truth (1945), Fiesta (1947), and the Columbo episode "A Matter of Honor" (1976).
- The Bullfighters (1945), film starring the comedy duo Laurel and Hardy.
- Bullfighter from Brooklyn (1953), autobiography by matador Sidney Franklin.
- Bully for Bugs (1953), a Looney Tunes short featuring Bugs Bunny as a bullfighter.
- Bull Fever (1955), an account by Kenneth Tynan.
- Tommy the Toreador, 1959 musical film starring Tommy Steele.
- The Story of a Matador, David L. Wolper's 1962 documentary about the life of matador Jaime Bravo.
- Talk to Her, film by Pedro Almodóvar, contains subplot concerning female matador who is gored during a bullfight. The director was criticized for shooting footage of a bull being actually killed during a bullfight staged especially for the film.
- Shadow of a Bull (1964), novel by Maia Wojciechowska about a bullfighter's son, Manolo Olivar.
- Mexico (1992), historical novel by James Michener. The frame story is a group of American tourists who come to Mexico to watch a bullfight. Bullfighting tradition, bull breeding, and shaving of bull's horns to prevent injury are explained.
- Take a Bow, music video revolved around famous bullfighter played by Madonna (singer) (1994).
- The Wild Man (2001), novel by Patricia Nell Warren about a non-conformist gay torero, set in 1960s Fascist Spain.
- Into the Arena: The World of the Spanish Bullfight (2011), book by Alexander Fiske-Harrison about his time in Spain as an aficionado in 2009 and as a bullfighter in 2010. ISBN 1847654290.
- ¡Que viva México!, a film directed by Sergei Eisenstein, has a segment featuring a bullfight.
- The Book of Life, an animated movie about a bullfighter who wants to be a musician.
- Ferdinand, an animated film covering the adventures of Ferdinand the bull as he is raised and trained to become a bull in the ring.
- Afternoons of Solitude (2024), documentary film directed by Albert Serra following the Peruvian bullfighter Andrés Roca Rey over the course of several corridas.

== See also ==
- Bull wrestling
