= Andrés Roca Rey =

Peruvian bullfighter (born 1996)

- Andrés Roca Rey on the cover of Les Cahiers du Cinéma, March 6, 2025
- Born: Andrés Roca Rey Valdez; October 21, 1996 (age 29); Lima, Peru
- Occupation: Bullfighter
- Years active: 2008–present
- Website: https://rocarey.info/

Andrés Roca Rey, also known simply as Roca Rey, is a Peruvian matador.

He is the younger brother of Fernando Roca Rey, also a matador. His uncle, José Antonio, was a rejoneador, and his grandfather worked in bullfighting administration in Lima.

== Career and awards ==
Roca Rey's career began in 2008 in a bout against his first calf; he trained throughout Latin America and Europe before being "confirmed" as a full matador in 2016.

Throughout the 2010s and 2020s Roca Rey received many distinctions in bullfighting. He won the Fallas twice. He has several times won the "Golden Scapular" prize in the annual Lord of Miracles festival and bullfighting competition in his hometown of Lima. On Ash Wednesday 2026, he had an audience at the Vatican with Pope Leo XIV, who also similarly at one time in Peru.

== In media ==
Roca Rey was interviewed for The Critic magazine in 2021 by Christopher North, where he was called "arguably the best torero in the world, and unarguably the most popular." He received similar praise from North In 2022 and 2024. He has also garnered coverage in La Repubblica and Le Journal du Dimanche for bringing young people to bullfighting and defending the sport.

Roca Rey was the subject of a 2024 documentary film called Afternoons of Solitude (Tardes de soledad) by film director Albert Serra. Afternoons was awarded the Feroz Zinemaldia Award and the Golden Shell for best film at the San Sebastián International Film Festival in 2024.
