= Afternoons of Solitude =

2024 film directed by Albert Serra

- Theatrical release poster
- Spanish: Tardes de soledad
- Directed by: Albert Serra
- Starring: Andrés Roca Rey
- Cinematography: Artur Tort Pujol
- Edited by: Albert Serra; Artur Tort Pujol
- Production companies: Andergraun Films; Lacima Producciones; Idéale Audiences; Rosa Filmes
- Distributed by: A Contracorriente Films (Spain); Dulac Distribution (France)
- Release dates: 23 September 2024 (Zinemaldia); 7 March 2025 (Spain); 26 March 2025 (France)
- Running time: 125 minutes
- Countries: Spain; Portugal; France
- Language: Spanish
- Box office: $717,368

Afternoons of Solitude (Spanish: Tardes de soledad) is a 2024 documentary film directed by Albert Serra about the Peruvian bullfighter Andrés Roca Rey. Though Roca is on screen throughout, the film contains neither commentary nor interviews, and reveals very little about Roca's personality, motives, or his life outside bullfighting.

The film world premiered at the main competition of the 72nd San Sebastián International Film Festival on 23 September 2024, where it won the Golden Shell. It was theatrically released in Spain on 7 March 2025 by A Contracorriente Films.

It earned EFA Awards nominations for Best Film and Best Documentary.

== Plot ==
The film depicts matador Andrés Roca Rey and his entourage throughout fourteen corridas. There are long extended fight sequences filmed very close up, punctuated by torero Roca and his entourage, before or after these sometimes bloody sequences, traveling by car and talking about the performance of Roca. There are also scenes of Roca in his hotel room praying and dressing or undressing from his flamboyant traje de luces (suit of lights) costume before or after these corridas.

== Production ==
The film is a Spanish-French-Portuguese co-production by Andergraun Films alongside Lacima Producciones, Idéale Audiences, and Rosa Filmes. Production was extended by five years, three years for shooting footage and two for editing the material.

The color cinematography, by Artur Tort Pujol, is often very closely focused on Roca and his face, isolating him in a way similar to Douglas Gordon and Philippe Parreno's 2006 documentary of Zinedine Zidane called Zidane: A 21st Century Portrait. Extreme closeups sometimes isolate details in the ring: like the bull's hooves or its face during its death throes or the side of the picador's horse. The film makes however no overt comment about bullfighting.

== Music ==
The use of music contains that of Marc Verdaguer and Camille Saint-Saëns and Jorma Kaukonen of the Jefferson Airplane's "Embryonic Journey" Flamenco-style instrumental song from their 1967 Surrealistic Pillow LP.

== Release ==
The film world premiered in September 2024 at the 72nd San Sebastián International Film Festival, where it won the Golden Shell.

The film was scheduled to debut at the Kursaal on 23 September 2024, in competition for the Golden Shell of the 72nd San Sebastián International Film Festival. Ahead of the film's premiere, PACMA asked for its removal from the festival slate. It also made it to the slate of the 2024 New York Film Festival. The film was distributed in Spain by A Contracorriente Films, with an theatrical release in Spain set for 7 March 2025. Meanwhile, Dulac programmed a rollout in French theatres for 26 March 2025. Films Boutique acquired international sales rights.

== Reception ==
On the review aggregator website Rotten Tomatoes, 88% of 43 critics' reviews are positive. The website's consensus reads: "Afternoons of Solitude is a stark, ritualistic immersion into bullfighting whose open-ended editing and sensory repetition pursue an unflinching purity, marking it as one of Albert Serra's most mature and unexpectedly accessible works." Metacritic, which uses a weighted average, assigned the film a score of 85 out of 100, based on 12 critics, indicating "universal acclaim".

Luis Martínez of El Mundo gave the film 4 stars, declaring it as "a monumental, precious, precise, brutal, grief-stricken, tragic, beautiful and, from any point of view, unique film".

Jonathan Romney of ScreenDaily described the film as "a deeply immersive work and an unashamedly repetitive one".

Afternoons of Solitude topped Cahiers du Cinéma's annual top 10 films list for 2025.

=== Accolades ===
Year	Award	Category	Nominee(s)	Result	Ref.
2024	72nd San Sebastián International Film Festival	Feroz Zinemaldia Award		Won	
2024	72nd San Sebastián International Film Festival	Golden Shell for Best Film		Won	
2025	31st Forqué Awards	Best Documentary Film		Nominated	
2026	19th Cinema Eye Honors	Outstanding Non-Fiction Feature	Albert Serra, Montse Triola, Luis Ferrón, Pedro Palacios, Artur Tort, Mac Verdaguer, and Jordi Ribas	Nominated	
2026	19th Cinema Eye Honors	Outstanding Direction	Albert Serra	Nominated	
2026	19th Cinema Eye Honors	Outstanding Cinematography	Artur Tort	Nominated	
2026	38th European Film Awards	Best Documentary		Nominated	
2026	18th Gaudí Awards	Best Documentary Film		Won	
2026	18th Gaudí Awards	Best Director	Albert Serra	Nominated	
2026	18th Gaudí Awards	Best Cinematography	Artur Tort	Nominated	
2026	18th Gaudí Awards	Best Editing	Albert Serra, Artur Tort	Won	
2026	18th Gaudí Awards	Best Sound	Jordi Ribas, Bruno Tarrière	Nominated	
2026	18th Gaudí Awards	Best Visual Effects	Xavier Pérez, Arnaud Chelet	Nominated	
2026	81st CEC Medals	Best Documentary Film		Nominated	
2026	81st CEC Medals	Best Director	Albert Serra	Nominated	
2026	40th Goya Awards	Best Documentary		Won	
2026	40th Goya Awards	Best Director	Albert Serra	Nominated	

== See also ==
- List of Spanish films of 2025
- List of French films of 2025
