= Rosalie Varda =

French costume designer, producer, writer and actress

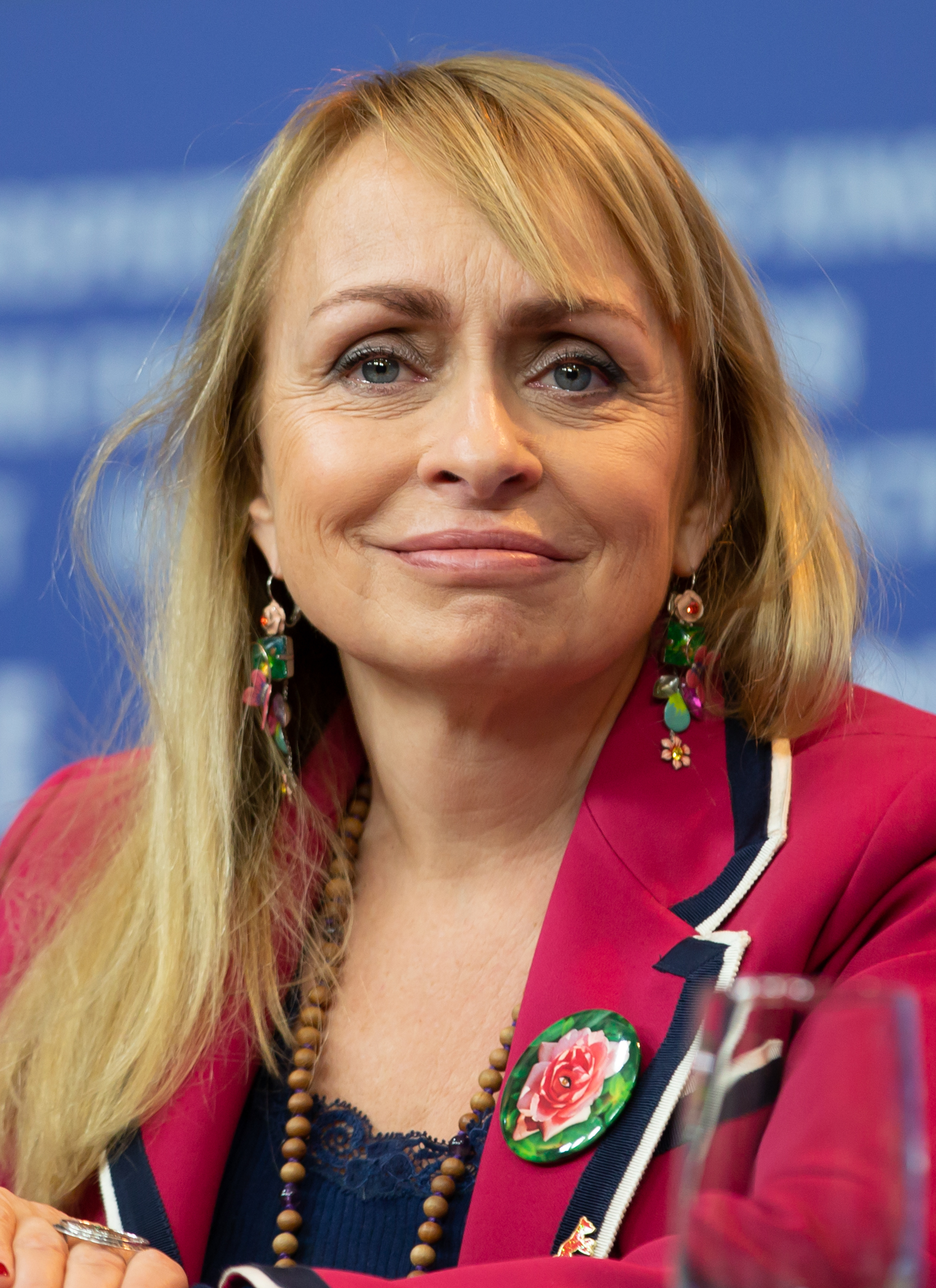
- Varda in 2019
- Born: 28 May 1958 (age 68); Paris, France
- Occupations: Director, screenwriter, editor, actor, producer, installation artist, photographer
- Years active: 1979–present
- Parent(s): Agnès Varda (mother); Antoine Bourseiller (father); Jacques Demy (step-father)
- Relatives: Mathieu Demy (half-brother); Marie Sara (half-sister); Christophe Bourseiller (step-brother)

Rosalie Varda (French pronunciation: [ʁozali vaʁda]; born 28 May 1958) is a French costume designer, producer, writer and actress. She is perhaps best known for producing the documentary Faces Places, directed by and starring her mother Agnès Varda, for which she received an Academy Award for Best Documentary Feature nomination at the 90th Academy Awards in 2018.

== Filmography ==
Costume Designer

- 1980: La naissance du jour
- 1982: Godard's Passion
- 1982: Une chambre en ville
- 1984: Thieves After Dark
- 1984: Le matelot 512
- 1985: Parking
- 1986: Bleu comme l'enfer
- 1988: Three Seats for the 26th
- 1995: One Hundred and One Nights
- 2001: Le plafond (Short)
- 2003: Le lion volatil (Short)
- 2011: Americano

Costume Department

- 1979: Lady Oscar (trainee costume designer)
- 1981: The Wings of the Dove (assistant costume designer)
- 1982: Le grand pardon (costumer)
- 2002: Love Street (costumer)

Actress

- 1964: The Umbrellas of Cherbourg as Françoise Cassard (cast)
- 1973: A Slightly Pregnant Man as Une spectatrice à Bobino
- 1977: One Sings, the Other Doesn't as Marie (final film role)

Producer

- 2011: Americano (co-producer)
- 2015: Les 3 boutons (short) (producer)
- 2017: Faces Places (documentary) (producer)
