= List of female bullfighters =

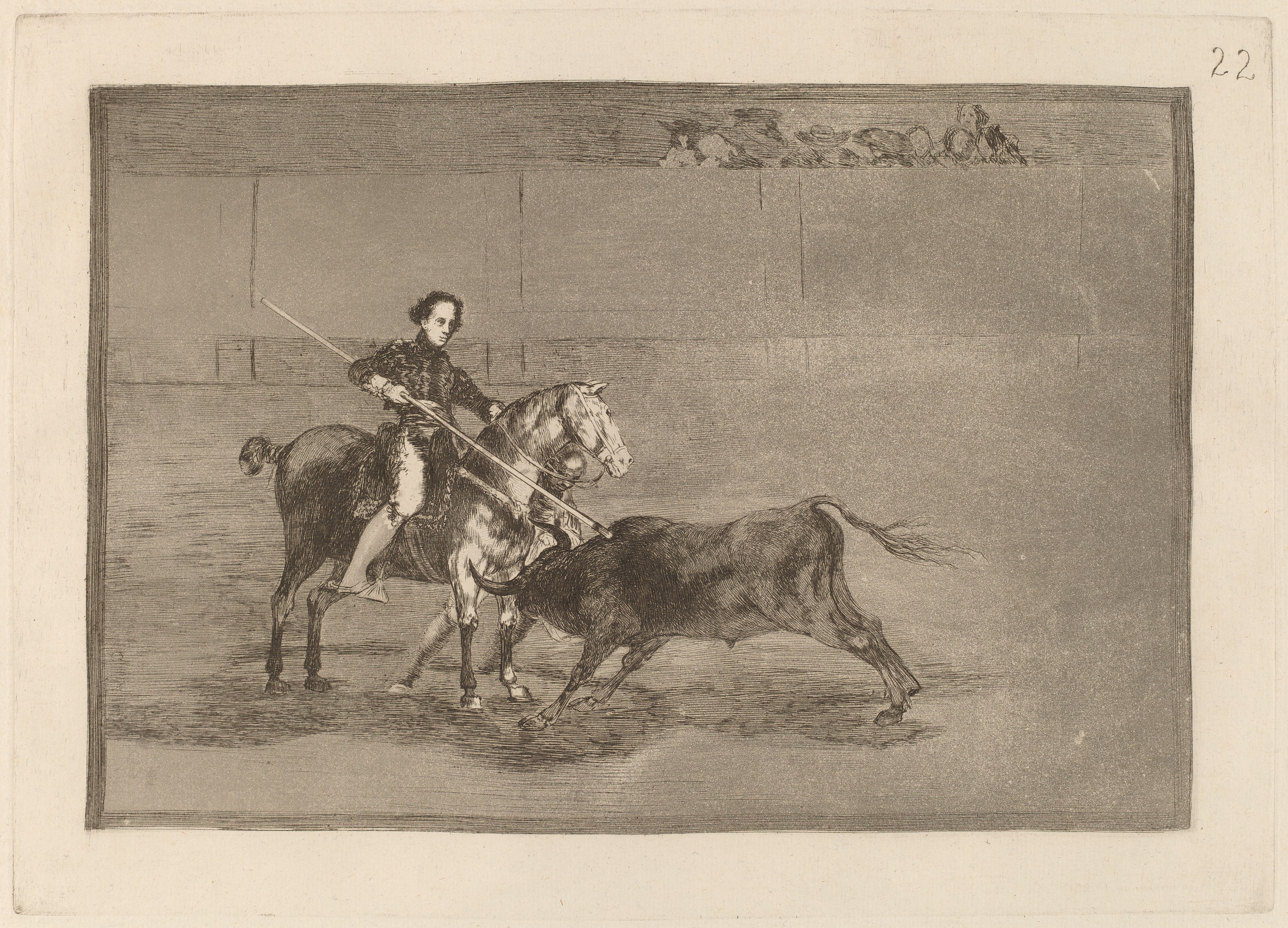
Nicolasa Escamilla, AKA La Pajuelera, depicted by Goya in his La Tauromaquia series

This is a list of female bullfighters who are notably participating, or have in the past participated, in bullfighting. Women in bullfighting has been traced to the sport's earliest renditions in Spain, namely during the late-1700s and early-1800s. Spanish painter Francisco Goya first depicted a female bullfighter in his etching work La Pajuelera, which featured a woman sparring with a bull on horseback in 1816. During the Spanish Civil War of the 1930s, women were forced to exile in other Spanish-speaking countries and the United States in order to continue bullfighting. In Spain – along with many countries in Latin America and Asia – women were banned from the sport. They were banned from bullfighting in Spain until 1974, and in Japan until 2018.

Women had difficulty completing their alternativa, a ceremony where a bullfighter becomes a matador, during the 1980s due to the social pressures of the decade. Spanish bullfighter Cristina Sánchez was the first woman matador in Europe, gaining full status in 1996.

== Female bullfighters ==
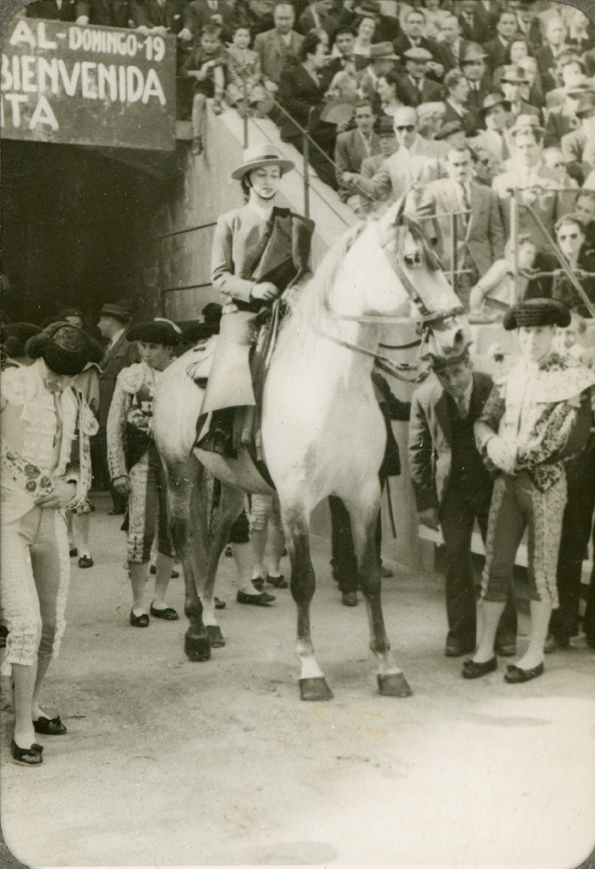
Conchita Cintrón

- Isabel Beniers
- Teresa Bolsi
- Conchita Cintrón
- Elena Gayral
- Angela Hernandez
- Blanca Inés Macías Monsalve (Rosarillo de Colombia)

=== American Female bullfighters ===
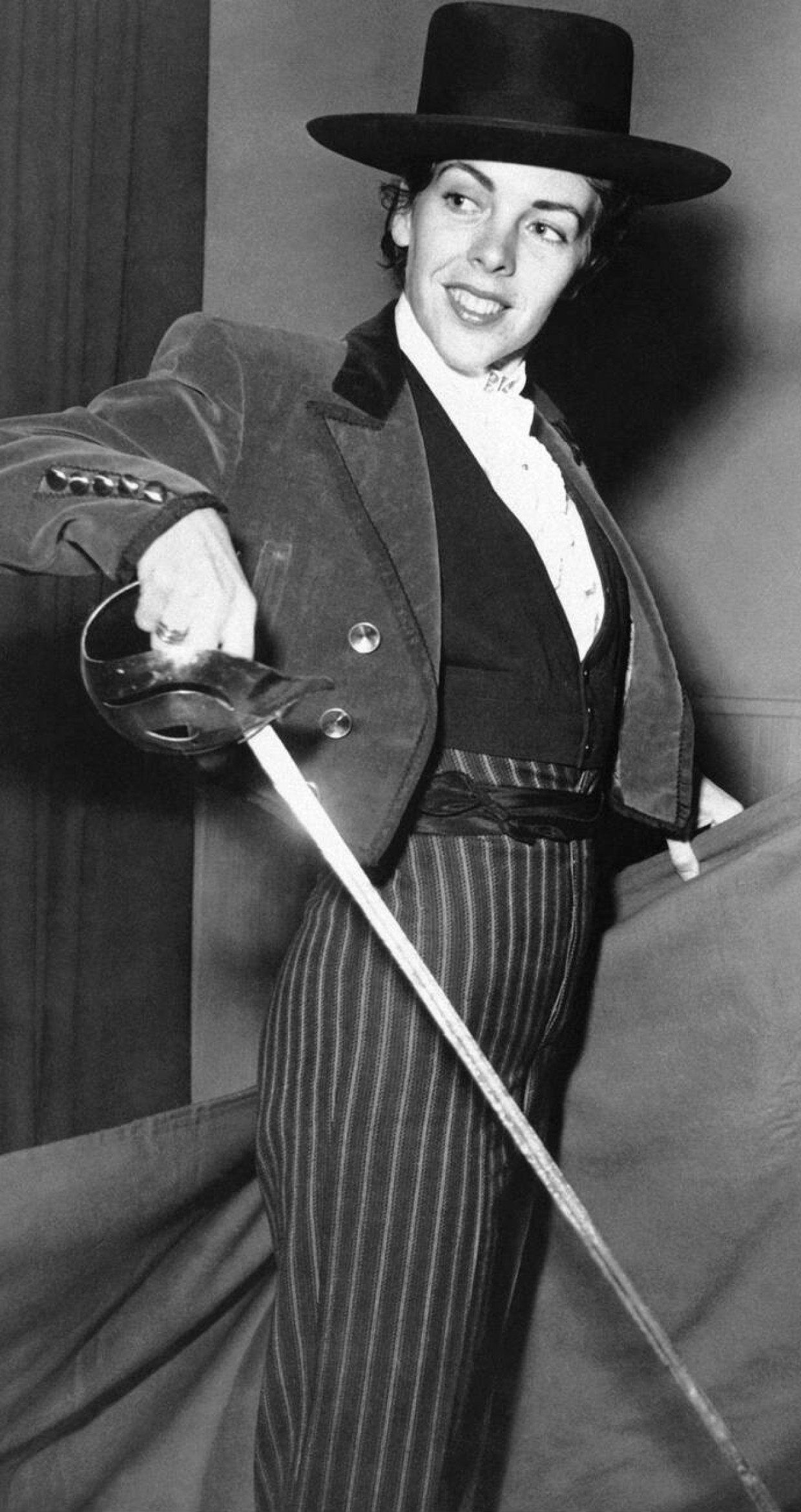
Patricia McCormick

- Bette Ford
- Patricia McCormick

=== French Female bullfighters ===
- Léa Vicens
- Marie Sara

=== Mexican Female bullfighters ===
- Lupita López
- Hilda Tenorio

=== Portuguese Female bullfighters ===
- Sónia Matias
- Isabel Ramos
- Ana Batista
- Ana Rita
- Joana Andrade

=== Spanish Female bullfighters ===
- Joaquina Ariza Geniz (La Algabeña)
- Maribel Atienzar
- Olga Casado Mendoza
- Juana Cruz
- Nicolasa Escamilla (La Pajuelera)
- Mari Fortes Roca
- Martina García
- Alicia Tomás Jiménez
- Conchi Ríos
- María Salomé Rodríguez (La Reverte, later transitioned to male)
- Cristina Sánchez
- Mari Paz Vega

=== Swedish Female bullfighters ===
- Agnes von Rosen

== Gallery ==
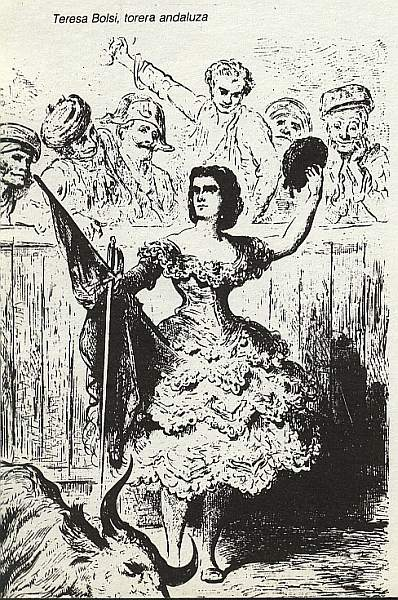
Teresa Bolsi

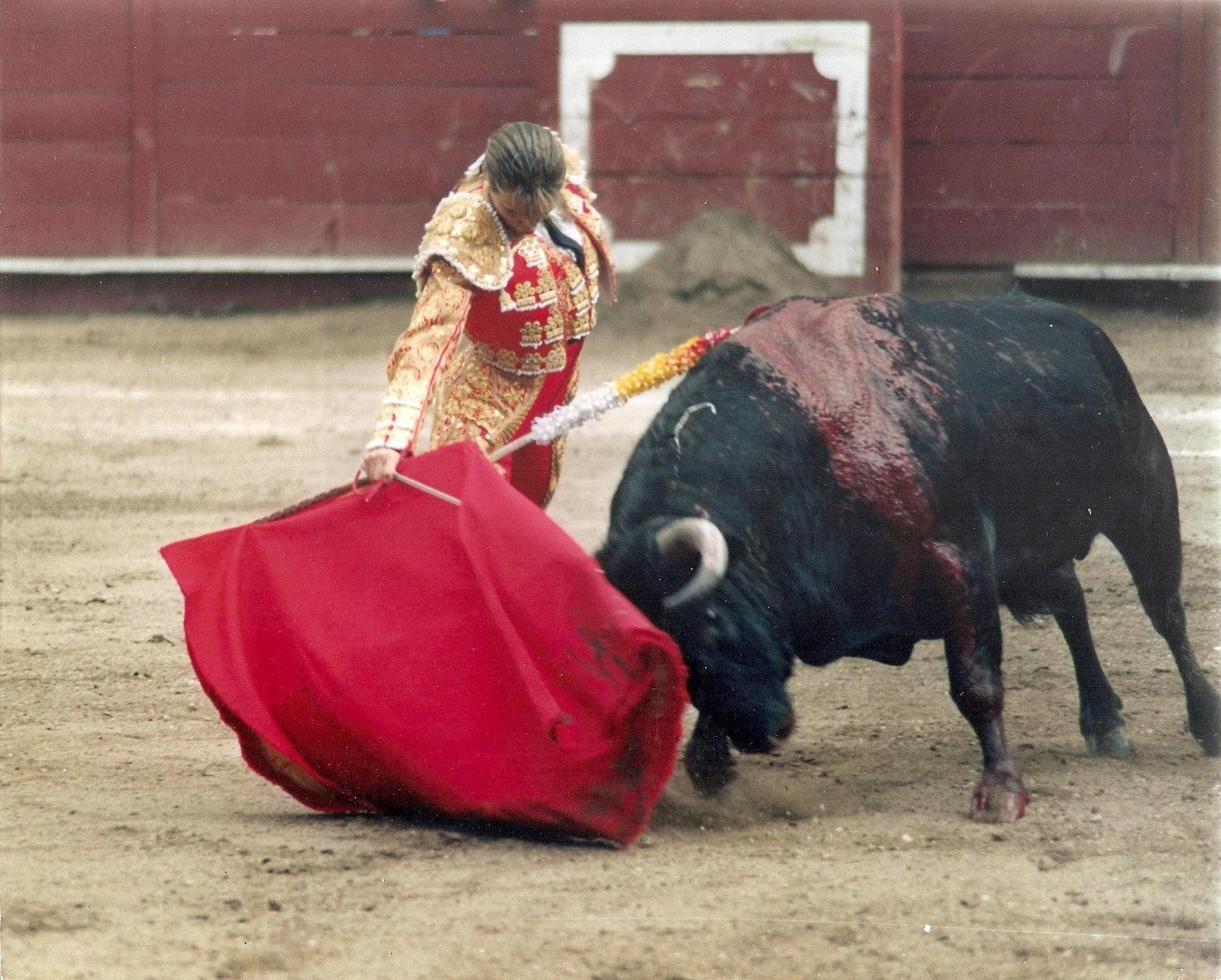
Cristina Sánchez

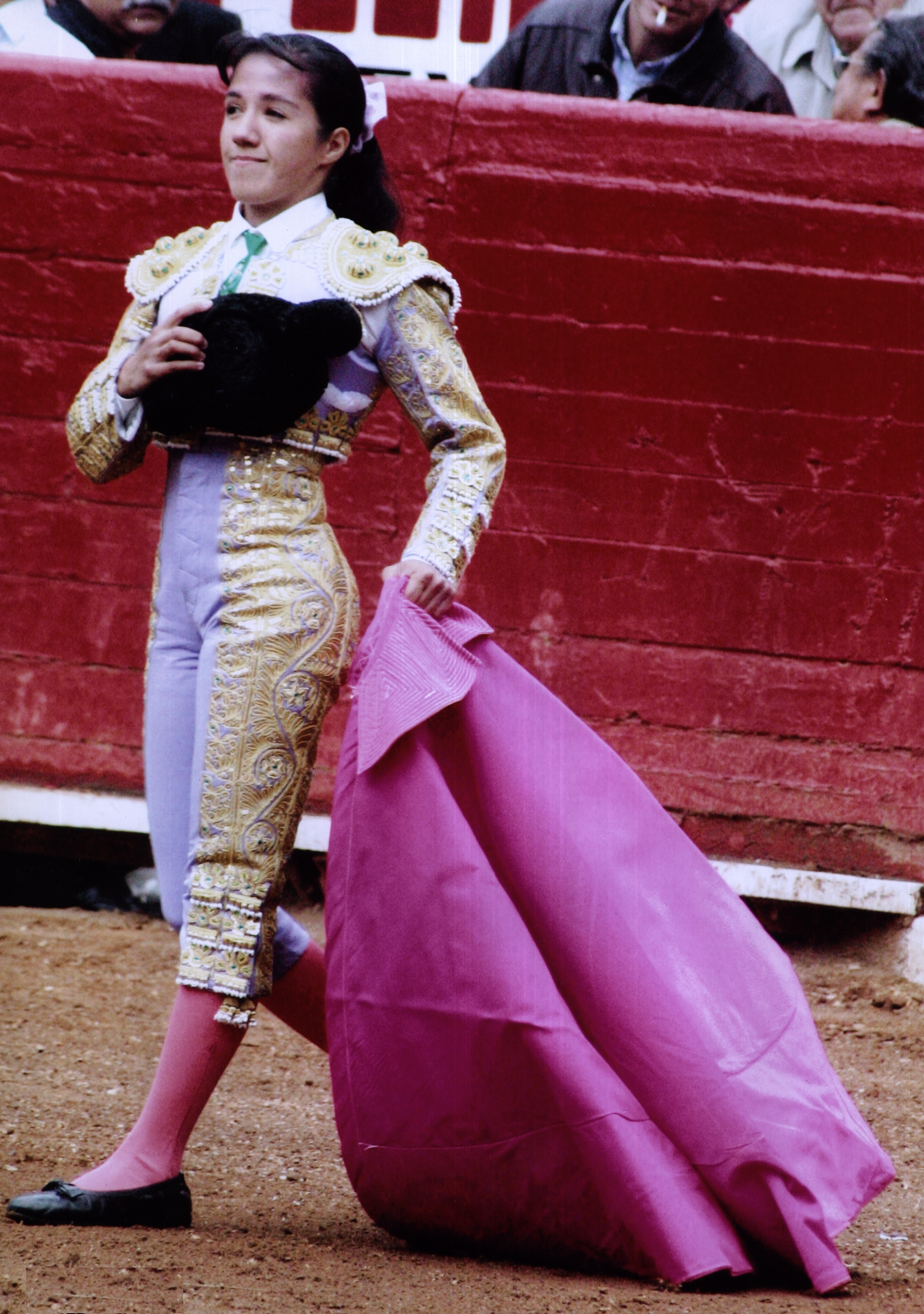
Hilda Tenorio

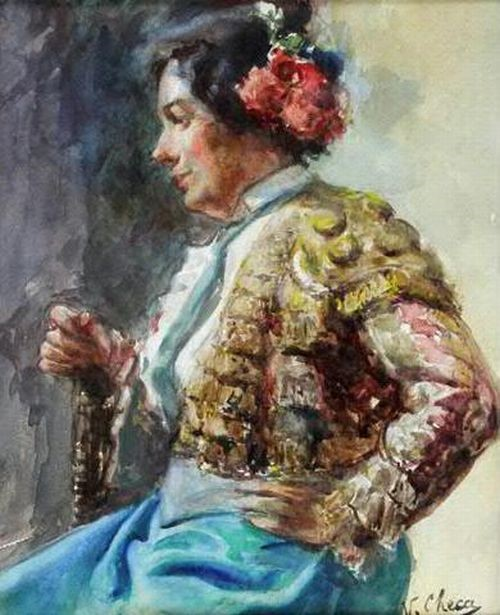
Martina García

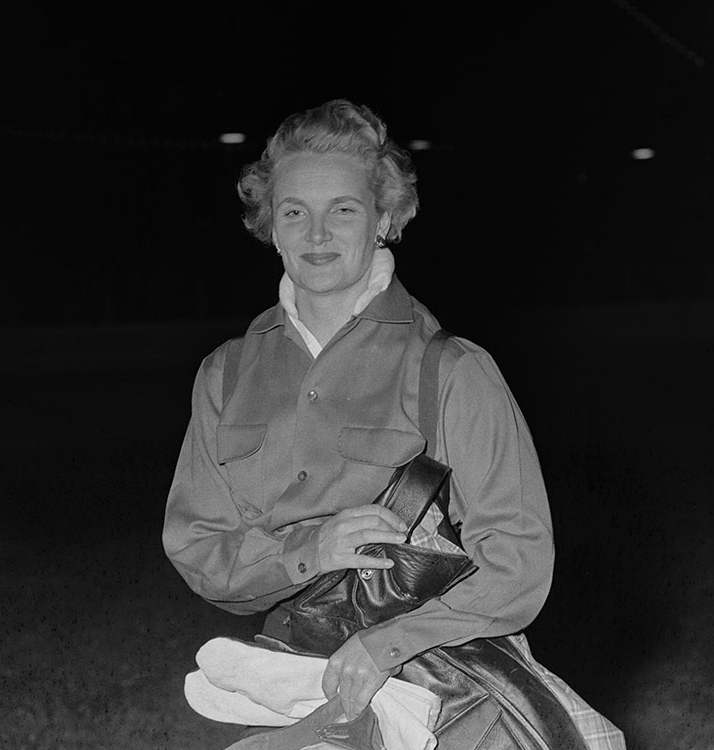
Agnes von Rosen

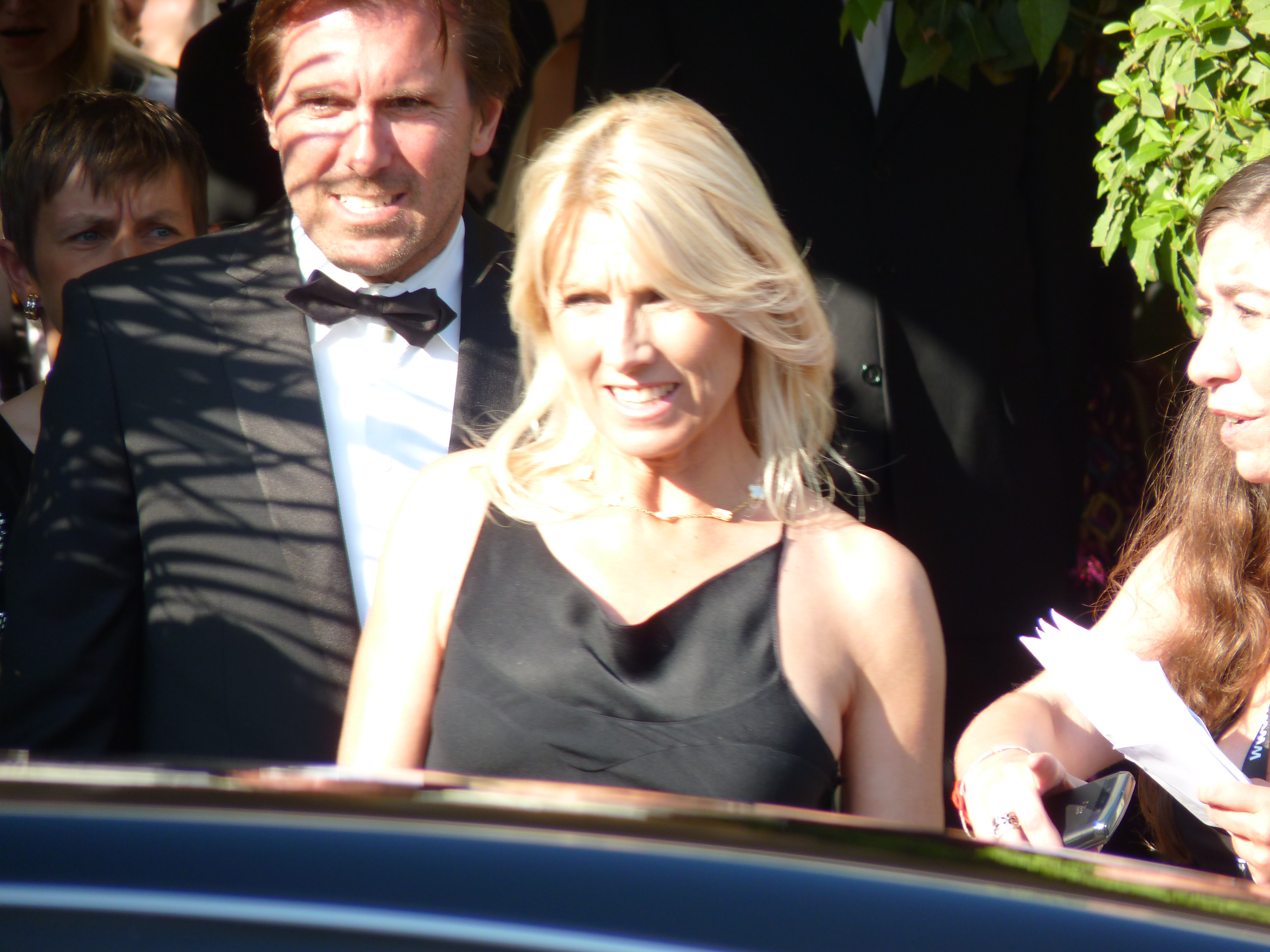
Marie Sara

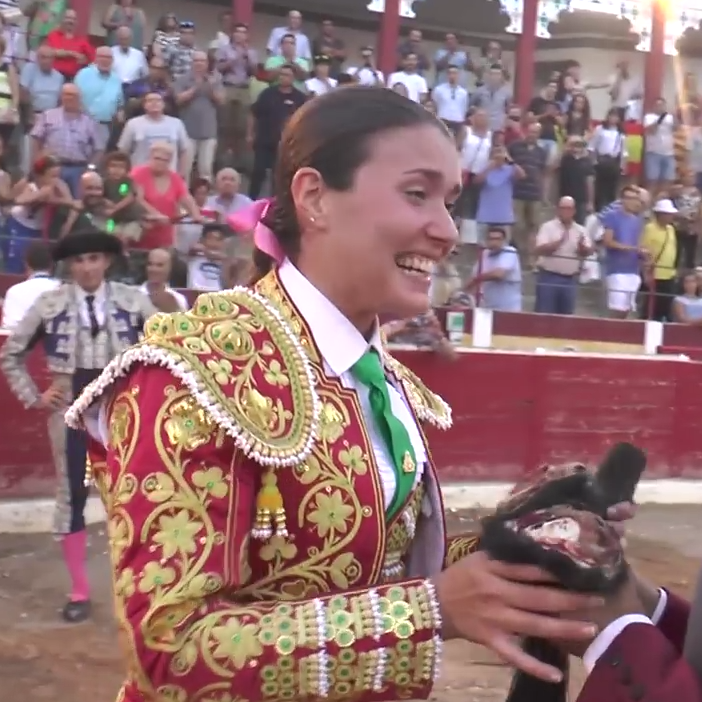
Conchi Ríos

== See also ==
- Bullfighting
- List of male bullfighters
- History of women in Spanish-style bullfighting
