= Two or Three Things I Know About Her =

1967 film by Jean-Luc Godard

- Theatrical release poster
- French: Deux ou trois choses que je sais d'elle
- Directed by: Jean-Luc Godard
- Screenplay by: Jean-Luc Godard
- Based on: "Les étoiles filantes" by Catherine Vimenet
- Produced by: Anatole Dauman; Raoul Lévy
- Starring: Marina Vlady
- Narrated by: Jean-Luc Godard
- Cinematography: Raoul Coutard
- Edited by: Françoise Collin; Chantal Delattre
- Production companies: Anouchka Films; Argos Films; Les Films du Carrosse; Parc Film
- Distributed by: UGC; CFDC; Sirius
- Release date: 17 March 1967 (France)
- Running time: 87 minutes
- Country: France
- Language: French

Two or Three Things I Know About Her (French: Deux ou trois choses que je sais d'elle) is a 1967 French New Wave film written and directed by Jean-Luc Godard, one of three features he completed that year. As with the other two (La Chinoise and Weekend), it is considered both socially and stylistically radical. Village Voice critic Amy Taubin considers the film to be among the greatest achievements in filmmaking.

== Description ==
Although there are actors reciting lines in many of the scenes, the film does not have the structure or style of a conventional narrative film (with an introduction, conflict, and resolution), and is, instead, more of an essay film about Godard's view of contemporary life. There are shots of the ongoing construction in Paris interspersed between and within the dramatized scenes, the cast often breaks the fourth wall by looking into the camera and delivering monologues about their thoughts and lives, and a large percentage of the soundtrack is occupied by Godard's philosophical whispered narration about such topics as politics, reality, consciousness, and meaning.

The dramatic plot of the film presents just over 24 hours in the sophisticated, but empty, life of Juliette Jeanson, a bourgeois married mother of two young children who works as a prostitute during the day. The morning after an uneventful evening spent at her home in one of the new high-rise apartment buildings on the outskirts of Paris, Juliette travels to the city proper, where she drops off her screaming daughter with a man who watches the children of several prostitutes in his brothel-like apartment. She shops for a dress at a fashionable store, goes to a cafe (where she sees several other housewife/prostitutes), has an appointment with a young client, and visits a beauty salon. Then, she and Marianne, her manicurist, visit her husband, Robert, at the garage/car wash at which he works, on their way to an appointment with John Bogus, a war correspondent for an American newspaper who Marianne has seen before. After having Juliette and Marianne parade back and forth naked (except for bags with airline logos on their heads), Bogus invites Juliette to join him and Marianne in bed, but Juliette refuses and, instead, thinks about her awareness of the Vietnam War, and then about her husband. In a cafe, Robert talks to the woman at the next table while he waits for Juliette to come pick him up, and, nearby, a Nobel Prize-winning writer talks with a young female fan. When she gets home, Juliette reflects on a meaningful, but only partly-remembered, experience she had that day and does her typical evening routine. In bed, she tries, unsuccessfully, to talk with Robert about modern man and love before giving up and asking him for a cigarette.

== Cast ==
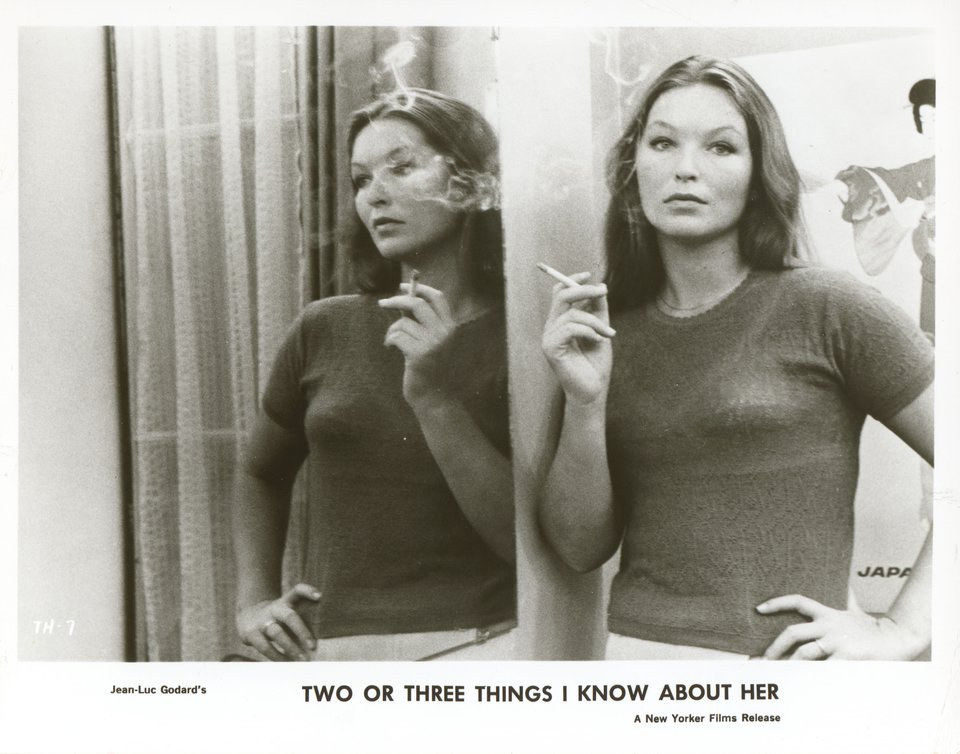
Marina Vlady as Juliette Jeanson

- Marina Vlady as Juliette Jeanson
- Roger Montsoret as Robert Jeanson, Juliette's husband
- Jean Narboni as Roger, Robert's friend
- Christophe Bourseiller as Christophe Jeanson, Juliette and Robert's son
- Marie Bourseiller as Solange Jeanson, Juliette and Robert's daughter
- Joseph Gehrard as Mr. Gehrard, who runs the brothel/daycare
- Yves Beneyton as Juliette's young client, who works in the Métro
- Anny Duperey as Marianne, who works in a beauty salon and as a prostitute
- Raoul Lévy as John Bogus, a war correspondent for the Arkansas Daily
- Juliet Berto as the girl talking to Robert in the cafe
- Claude Miller as Bouvard, the man reading excerpts from random books in the cafe
- Jean-Patrick Lebel as Pécuchet, the man writing down what Bouvard says
- Jean-Pierre Laverne as Ivanov, a Nobel Prize-winning writer
- Blandine Jeanson as Ivanov's fan

Jean-Luc Godard provides the whispered narration heard throughout the film.

== Background and production ==
The film was inspired by "Les étoiles filantes" ("The Shooting Stars"), a 1966 article in Le Nouvel Observateur by Catherine Vimenet about prostitution among the housewives in the new high-rise suburbs of Paris. About his intentions, Godard stated that the film was "a continuation of the movement begun by Resnais in Muriel: an attempt at description of a phenomenon known in mathematics and sociology as a 'complex'", and that "basically what I am doing is making the spectator share the arbitrary nature of my choices, and the quest for general rules which might justify a particular choice", adding: "I watch myself filming, and you hear me thinking aloud. In other words, it isn't a film, it's an attempt at a film and presented as such." He also said he "wanted to include everything: sports, politics, even groceries" in the film, and, indeed, the film's most famous shot is a lengthy close-up of a cup of coffee.

Godard began production on the film in the summer of 1966. Shortly afterward, he was approached by producer Georges de Beauregard, who asked him to quickly make a film to offset a financial shortfall incurred after Jacques Rivette's film The Nun (1966) was banned by the French government. Happy to help his frequent collaborator, Godard began work on Made in U.S.A (1966), shooting Two or Three Things I Know About Her in the morning and Made in U.S.A in the afternoon each day for one month.

There was a script for Two or Three Things I Know About Her, but Godard also had Vlady and some of the other actors wear earpieces while shooting, and he would sometimes feed them new lines or ask questions to which they were expected to give spontaneous answers that were appropriate to their characters.

The small amount of music in the film includes an excerpt from Beethoven's String Quartet No. 16 in F major, Op. 135.

== Title ==
A promotional poster for the film offered different meanings for the "her" of the title, each one a French feminine noun:

- HER, the cruelty of neo-capitalism
- HER, prostitution
- HER, the Paris region
- HER, the bathroom that 70% of the French don't have
- HER, the terrible law of huge building complexes
- HER, the physical side of love
- HER, the life of today
- HER, the war in Vietnam
- HER, the modern call-girl
- HER, the death of modern beauty
- HER, the circulation of ideas
- HER, the gestapo of structures

== Themes ==
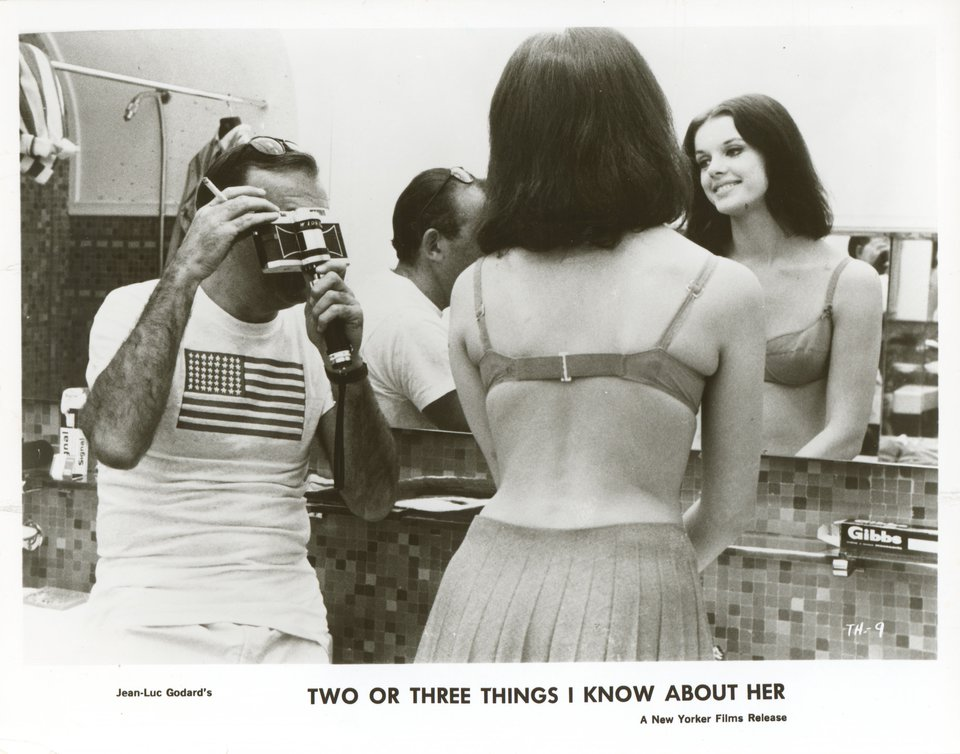
US Publicity still for the film.

Juliette lives in one of many high-rises being erected in the banlieues (suburbs) of Paris. Though the structures were meant to provide housing to families working in the growing capital during the prosperous post-war years, Godard saw the banlieues as the infrastructure for promoting a value system based on consumerism, a term he equated with prostitution. Godard argued that a consumerist society demands a workforce living in regimented time and space and forced to work jobs they don't like, which he said was "a prostitution of the mind."

On 25 October 1966, Godard appeared on the French television program Zoom to debate with government official Jean St. Geours, who predicted that advertising would increase, as the basic impulse of the French society at the time was to increase its standard of living. Godard responded that he saw advertisers as pimps, who bring women to the point at which they give their bodies without compunction by convincing them that what they can buy has more potential to bring happiness than does the loving enjoyment of sex.

As with many of Godard's films from the mid-1960s onward, Two or Three Things I Know About Her demonstrates his growing disenchantment with the United States. This contrasts with his earlier French New Wave films, such as Breathless (1960), which make admiring references to American cinema.

== Reception ==
Many critics regard the film as being among Godard's most significant works. On review aggregator website Rotten Tomatoes, it holds an approval rating of 94% based on 33 reviews, with an average score of 8.1/10; the site's "critics consensus" reads: "Two or Three Things I Know About Her marks a turning point in Godard's filmography – one that may confound more narratively dependent audiences, but rewards repeated viewings."

=== Awards ===
Two or Three Things I Know About Her was awarded the Prix Marilyn Monroe du Cinéma in 1967 from an all-woman jury that included Marguerite Duras and Florence Malraux. In the 2012 Sight & Sound poll of the greatest films ever made, it received 19 top-10 votes (16 from critics and three from directors).

=== American re-release ===
On 17 November 2006, the film was re-released in CinemaScope for a two-week run at Film Forum in New York City.

== See also ==
- Apartment Wife: Affair In the Afternoon
