= Bourseiller =

Bourseiller is a French surname. Notable people with the surname include:

- Antoine Bourseiller (1930–2013), French comedian and opera and theatre director
- Christophe Bourseiller (born 1957), French actor, writer, and journalist
