= Michel Pilorgé =

French actor (born 1945)

- Born: 13 August 1945 (age 81); Tesson, France
- Occupation: Actor
- Years active: 1964–present

Michel Pilorgé, born on 13 August 1945, is a French actor.

== Biography ==
Michel Pilorgé was born to a well-off family, to a doctor and a dentist. He grew up in Châteauroux, where he befriended Gérard Depardieu as a teenager. In the early 1960s, he decided to be an actor, against his parents' wishes. He debuted in 1964 in Switzerland, under François Simon's direction at the Carouge theater. After returning to France, he decided in 1965 to settle in Paris to pursue his career, and brought Depardieu along with him. Pilorgé took acting classes at the Théâtre National Populaire. This played a role in sparking Depardieu's interest in acting, after he attended one of Pilorgé's classes out of curiosity. Pilorgé was occasionally called Depardieu's "mentor"; both men later remained close friends. Pilorgé also took classes with the famous acting coach Jean-Laurent Cochet. He credited Jacques Dufilho as his own mentor in the acting profession.

Starting in 1967, Pilorgé embarked on a career in supporting roles in film and television, including in numerous productions that starred Depardieu. From the 1990s, he appeared mainly in French television productions, where he often portrayed genial characters or authority figures. He had a recurring role from 1990 to 2006 in the popular crime television series Navarro, playing the forensic pathologist.

He returned to the theater late in his career, after Bertrand Blier offered him in 1996 a part in his play Les Côtelettes, alongside Philippe Noiret and Michel Bouquet. He performed in this play for two years, and later appeared in other stage productions.

During the 2000s, Pilorgé was the chairman of the Union catholique du théâtre, de la musique et de la danse (Catholic union of theater, music and dance), a French non-profit organization and charity aimed at bringing together Catholic performers and helping those in need.

== Selected filmography ==
=== Film ===
- 1970: Le drapeau noir flotte sur la marmite, directed by Michel Audiard
- 1971: Le Cri du cormoran, le soir au-dessus des jonques, directed by Michel Audiard
- 1971: R.A.S., directed by Yves Boisset
- 1974: Going Places, directed by Bertrand Blier
- 1976: Maîtresse, directed by Barbet Schroeder
- 1976: The Question, directed by Laurent Heynemann
- 1977: This Sweet Sickness, directed by Claude Miller
- 1977: Animal, directed by Claude Zidi
- 1977: At Night All Cats Are Crazy, directed by Gérard Zingg
- 1979: I as in Icarus, directed by Henri Verneuil
- 1980: The Woman Cop, directed by Yves Boisset
- 1980: Inspector Blunder, directed by Claude Zidi
- 1981: Clara et les Chics Types, directed by Jacques Monnet
- 1982: My Other Husband, directed by Georges Lautner
- 1983: Que les gros salaires lèvent le doigt!, directed by Denys Granier-Deferre
- 1984: Rive droite, rive gauche, directed by Philippe Labro
- 1986: Evening Dress, directed by Bertrand Blier
- 1986: Kamikaze, directed by Didier Grousset
- 1989: Après la guerre, directed by Jean-Loup Hubert
- 1990: La Fracture du myocarde, directed by Jacques Fansten
- 1995: Les Anges gardiens, directed by Jean-Marie Poiré
- 1996: Les Bidochon, directed by Serge Korber
- 1997: Les Palmes de M. Schutz, directed by Claude Pinoteau
- 2004: San-Antonio, directed by Frédéric Auburtin
- 2005: The Demon Stirs, directed by Marie-Pascale Osterrieth

=== Television ===
- 1973: Le Château perdu (TV movie)
- 1974: Ardéchois cœur fidèle (miniseries)
- 1976: The Tiger Brigades (TV series, 1 episode)
- 1978: Médecins de nuit (TV series, 1 episode)
- 1980: Docteur Teyran (miniseries)
- 1980: Colette (miniseries)
- 1989: Marie Pervenche (TV series, 2 episodes)
- 1989: Le Retour d'Arsène Lupin (TV series, 1 episode)
- 1989: Maguy (TV series, 2 episodes)
- 1990: Imogène (TV series, 2 episodes)
- 1990: Haute tension (TV series, 1 episode)
- 1990–2006: Navarro (TV series)
- 1993 : L'Affaire Seznec, directed by Yves Boisset (TV movie)
- 1993: Une famille formidable (TV series, 3 episodes)
- 1993: A Year in Provence (miniseries)
- 1999: Balzac (miniseries)
- 2000: Le juge est une femme (TV series, 1 episode)
- 2000: Les Misérables (miniseries)
- 2001: Julie Lescaut (TV series, 1 episode)
- 2008: Paris enquêtes criminelles (TV series, 1 episode)
- 2008: Versailles, le rêve d'un roi (TV movie)
- 2009: Paris 16ème (TV series, 4 episodes)
- 2018: Capitaine Marleau (TV series, 1 episode)

== Theatre ==
- 1997 : Les Côtelettes by Bertrand Blier, directed by Bernard Murat, Théâtre de la Porte-Saint-Martin
- 2001 : La Jalousie by Sacha Guitry, directed by Bernard Murat, Théâtre Édouard VII
- 2007 : The Taming of the Shrew by William Shakespeare, directed by Cédric Grimoin, Théâtre du Nord-Ouest
- 2009: Les Tentations électives by Benjamin Oppert, directed by Philippe Brigaud, Théâtre du Nord-Ouest
- 2012 : Poil de carotte by Jules Renard, directed by himself and Jean-Philippe Ancelle, Théâtre du Lucernaire
- 2013 : Phèdre by Jean Racine, directed by Bernard Belin, Théâtre de Nesle
- 2014 : L'Alouette by Jean Anouilh, directed by Odile Mallet, Théâtre du Nord-Ouest
- 2018: Les Choristes by and directed by Christophe Barratier, Folies Bergère
- 2018: Dom Sganarelle by Jean-Philippe Ancelle, directer by himself and the author, Théâtre Le Ranelagh
- 2023 : Sherlock Holmes et l’affaire du pont de Thor, adapted from Arthur Conan Doyle, directed by Jean-Philippe Ancelle, Théâtre de Passy
