= Three Seats for the 26th =

Three Places for the 26th
- Directed by: Jacques Demy
- Written by: Jacques Demy
- Produced by: Claude Berri
- Starring: Yves Montand; Mathilda May; Françoise Fabian
- Cinematography: Jean Penzer
- Edited by: Sabine Mamou
- Music by: Michel Legrand
- Distributed by: AMLF
- Release date: 1988
- Running time: 116 minutes
- Country: France
- Language: French

Three Seats for the 26th (French: Trois places pour le 26) is a 1988 French romantic musical film, written and directed by Jacques Demy to music by Michel Legrand. Set in Marseille, it shows the singer and actor Yves Montand returning to the city where he grew up and looking up old friends, including his first love Mylène, who had been a prostitute and is now the wife of a jailed baron. The purpose of his visit is to rehearse a stage musical based on his life, where he falls in love with the female lead named Marion. It was Demy's last picture.

== Plot ==
Famous singer and actor Yves Montand arrives in Marseille, where he grew up, to rehearse a new musical based on his life. From his years as an unknown, including the loss of his first great love, the show moves on to his artistic and amorous links with stars like Édith Piaf and Marilyn Monroe.

In his free time, he looks up old friends, hoping in particular to find Mylène, his first love who worked as a prostitute. At his hotel, a card is left by Baroness de Lambert, who asks to see him. While in his dressing room, he is entranced by a fan called Marion, who asks him for three seats on the 26th so that she and the two girls she works with can attend the sold-out opening night. Though trained in acting, song and dance, she works in a perfume shop.

When the leading lady has to leave the cast because of pregnancy, Marion volunteers and is hired. When Yves rings up the mysterious baroness, he recognises from her voice that she is Mylène and the two have a tender reunion in the bar where they first met. She is living with the daughter she had after they parted but will lose her home as her husband has been sent to prison for five years.

The opening is a great success, and the show is booked to run in Paris. Yves and Marion celebrate with a kiss, and the two have sex and spend the night together. As they talk about each other's lives over breakfast, Marion realises Yves' descriptions of his former lover matches her own mother, and realizes that she is his daughter. Marion returns home to her mother, Mylène, to confront her about being Yves' daughter all along, but Marion manages to convince her to join her in the trip to Paris, knowing they love one another. Yves is stunned to see Marion arriving with Mylène, whom she reveals is her mother, and he realizes Marion is his daughter. Now a complete family happily reunited, Yves, Mylène, and Marion leave to board the train to Paris.

== Cast ==
- Yves Montand : Yves Montand
- Mathilda May : Marion de Lambert
- Françoise Fabian : Marie-Hélène, Baroness de Lambert (formerly Mylène Le Goff)
- Jean-Claude Bouillaud : the captain
- Antoine Bourseiller : Fonteneau
- Christophe Bourseiller : Serge
- Geoffrey Carey : Michael
- Sophie Castel : receptionist
- Katy Varda : Alice
- Marie-Dominique Chayze : Nicole
- Raoul Curet : hotel manager
- Mathieu Demy : Derderian
- Danielle Durou : Miss Destain
- Patrick Fierry : Toni Fontaine
- Paul Guers : Max Leehman
- Bertrand Lacy : Steve Larsenal
- Catriona MacColl : Betty Miller
- Pierre Maguelon : Marius Ceredo
- Christiane Minazzoli : Mrs Simonot
- Carlo Nell : Berlingot
- Jacques Nolot : Marcel Amy

== Reception ==
From the reviewer of Le Monde, "after the dark tragic passion of Une chambre en ville Demy returns with this final film to love as the supreme force in his art. Love in this case not only surmounts the age gap between Montand and his unknown daughter Marion but also survives the discovery that the two have unknowingly committed incest. Her sexual power over Montand is not idealised or ambiguous but in a bold and surprising fashion goes hand in hand with the feelings the two have for each other. Strong though her hold over Montand seems, her still very attractive mother exerts an even greater pull."
