= Patricia McCormick (bullfighter) =

American bullfighter

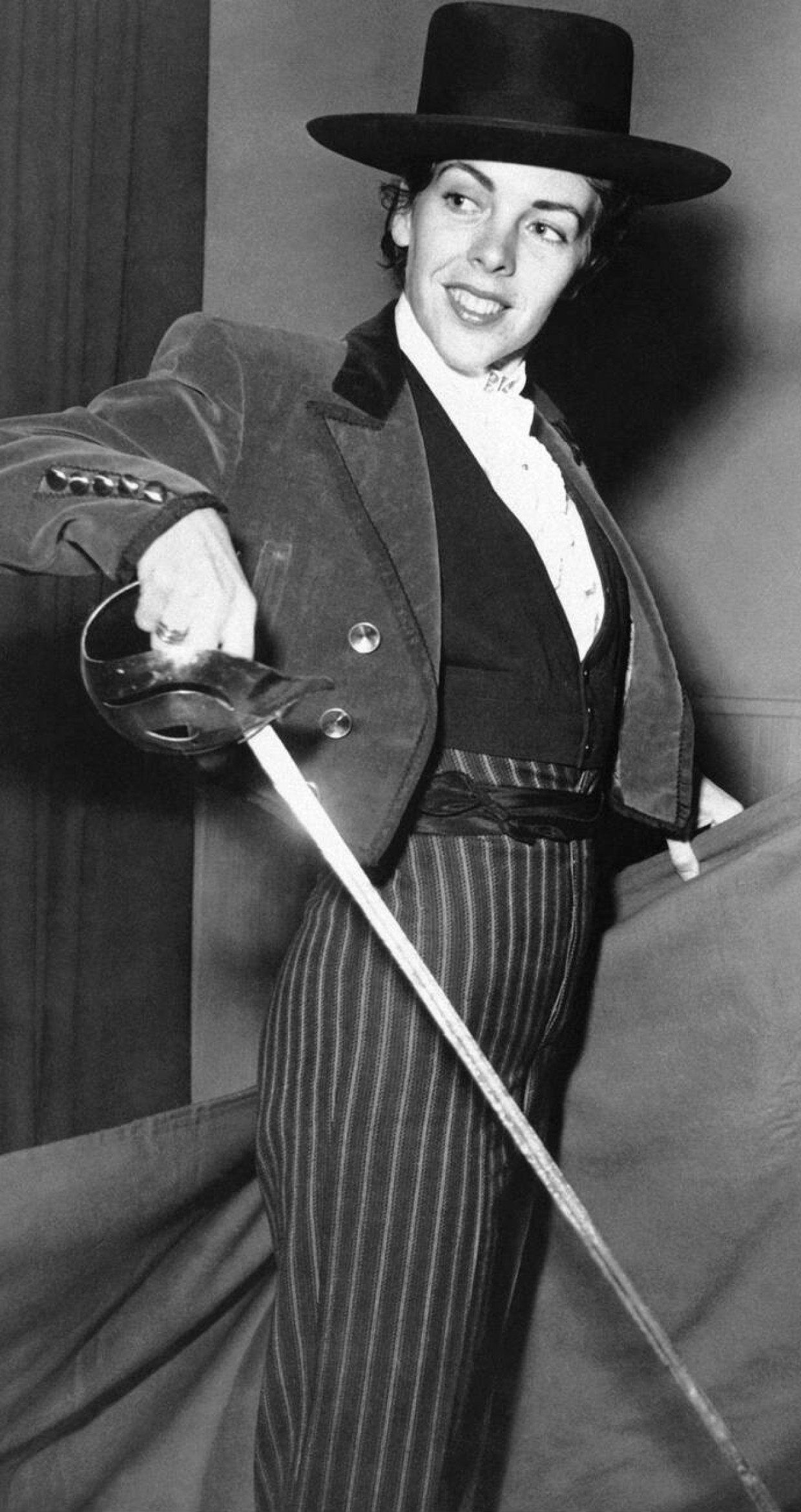
- Patrica McCormick in 1954
- Born: November 18, 1929; St. Louis, Missouri, U.S.
- Died: March 26, 2013 (aged 83); Del Rio, Texas, U.S.
- Education: Texas Western College
- Occupations: Professional bullfighter, secretary
- Years active: 1951–1962
- Known for: First professional female bullfighter in North America
- Website: web.archive.org/web/20231208054102/http://ladybullfighter.com/

Patricia McCormick (November 18, 1929 – March 26, 2013) was an American bullfighter. She is thought to be the first woman in North America to fight bulls professionally. (Note: Conchita Cintrón first fought several years earlier in Lima, Peru as a rejoneador (a bullfighter on horseback))

== Biography ==
Originally from St. Louis, Missouri, McCormick became enthralled with bullfighting after a trip to Mexico City with her family at the age of seven. The McCormick family eventually moved to Big Spring, Texas, where her father became chief engineer at Cosden Petroleum. She studied art and music at Texas Western College in El Paso and rediscovered bullfighting in the neighboring Mexican city of Ciudad Juárez.

She quit college and debuted as a bullfighter on September 9, 1951 in Juárez. She joined the Matador's Union soon after and began bullfighting as a professional Matadora in January 1952, the first American to do so. Throughout her decade-long career, she fought in 300 corridas throughout Mexico and Venezuela. Six times bulls gored her, once so seriously in September 1954 in Ciudad Acuña that a priest administered last rites. She never advanced from the apprentice rank of novillera as no male matador would sponsor her to do so. In 1962, she fought her last bull in San Antonio, Texas.

McCormick authored her autobiography, Lady Bullfighter, in 1954.

== Later life ==
After retiring, she moved to California, and did line drawings and watercolor scenes of bullfighting, living in Pasadena and Pebble Beach and working as a secretary at the Art Center College of Design in Pasadena.

In the early 2000s she returned to West Texas, in Midland and then Del Rio. In the spring of 2007, the Heritage Museum at Big Spring opened a permanent exhibit in her honor.

McCormick died on March 26, 2013. She never married nor had children.

== See also ==
- Bette Ford, American female bullfighter
- List of female bullfighters
