= Ars (film) =

1959 film

Ars is a 1959 French film short written and directed by Jacques Demy. and starring Jacques Demy and Bernard Toublanc-Michel. The film focuses on the life of Father John Vianney, and it also was released in Portugal on December 9,1983.
