= Cristina Sánchez =

Spanish bullfighter (born 1972)

Cristina Sánchez de Pablos
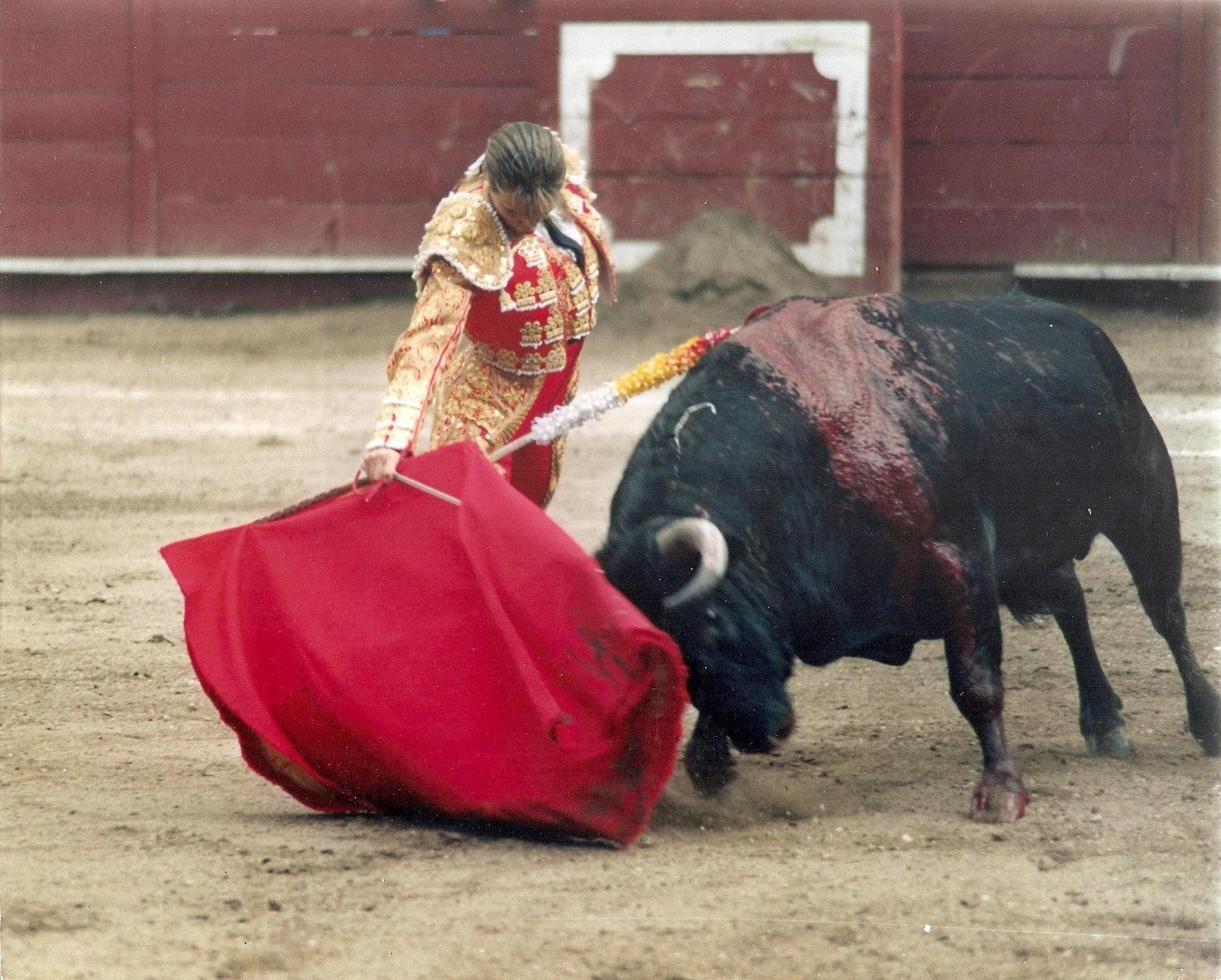
- Cristina Sánchez in the arena
- Born: 20 February 1972; Madrid, Spain
- Occupation: Professional bullfighter

Cristina Sánchez de Pablos (born 20 February 1972) is a Spanish bullfighter who gained prominence during the 1990s for being one of the first female bullfighters. She is the first woman to complete her alternativa in Europe.

== Career ==
Cristina Sánchez de Pablos was born on 20 February 1972 in Madrid, Spain. She was a professional bullfighter at bullrings in Ecuador and Mexico and undertook many presentations and demonstrations in Spain. She debuted as a bullfighter in Madrid on 13 February 1993. She took her alternativa at Nîmes on 25 May 1996. Standing as her "godfather" was Curro Romero, while José Mari Manzanares stood as witness.

Sánchez retired in 1999 and married the Portuguese banderillero Alexandre da Silva in 2000.

Sánchez was considered by some to be a representative of the feminist movement of the 1990s, as bullfighting is typically a male-dominated activity. She was also the subject of the Univision TV news program Primer Impacto, where Maria Celeste Arraras presented an article about her.

== See also ==
- List of female bullfighters
