= Lupita López =

Mexican bullfighter and matador (born 1978)

Lupita López (born Blanca Guadalupe López Maldonado; October 13, 1978) is a Mexican bullfighter and matadora. Born in Mérida, Yucatán, Lopez has been reported as deciding to be a bullfighter when she was eleven years old. She became a matador, aged 32, in 2011.

She came from a family of bullfighters. As of March 2011, Lopez was one of only four female professional bullfighters.

== See also ==
- List of female bullfighters
