= A Slightly Pregnant Man =

1973 film by Jacques Demy

- French theatrical release poster
- French: L'Événement le plus important depuis que l'homme a marché sur la Lune
- Directed by: Jacques Demy
- Written by: Jacques Demy
- Produced by: Raymond Danon
- Starring: Catherine Deneuve; Marcello Mastroianni; Micheline Presle; Marisa Pavan; Claude Melki; André Falcon; Alice Sapritch; Raymond Gérôme
- Cinematography: Andréas Winding
- Edited by: Anne-Marie Cotret
- Music by: Michel Legrand
- Production companies: Lira Films; Roas Produzioni
- Distributed by: Fox-Lira (France)
- Release dates: 20 September 1973 (France); 17 November 1973 (Italy)
- Running time: 92 minutes
- Countries: France; Italy
- Language: French
- Box office: $2.1 million

A Slightly Pregnant Man (French: L'Événement le plus important depuis que l'homme a marché sur la Lune, lit. 'The Most Important Event Since Man Walked on the Moon'; Italian: Niente di grave, suo marito è incinto, lit. 'No Big Deal, Your Husband Is Pregnant') is a 1973 comedy film written and directed by Jacques Demy. The film stars Catherine Deneuve and Marcello Mastroianni, with Micheline Presle, Marisa Pavan, Claude Melki, André Falcon, Alice Sapritch and Raymond Gérôme.

== Plot ==
Marco is a driving instructor in Paris who is engaged to single mother Irène, a hairdresser. Together, they raise a young son, Lucas. They have a chicken dinner and later attend a Mireille Mathieu concert. During the concert, Marco suffers a dizzy spell and they leave. Back home, Irène becomes concerned and urges Marco to see a doctor, but he initially declines, deducing he has an upset stomach caused by the chicken. The next morning, Marco consults Dr. Delavigne, who determines that he is experiencing physical symptoms associated with pregnancy. She arranges to have Marco visit a gynecologist. On his way home, he purchases strawberries and a textbook on female anatomy. Because it is wintertime, Irène questions why Marco bought strawberries, but recalls she had a craving for them when she was pregnant with Lucas.

The next morning, on the drive to Dr. Chaumont's office, Marco tells Irène he is pregnant and she faints. At his office, Chaumont confirms the pregnancy and concludes that the hormones in the chicken have caused an imbalance making him sufficiently feminine to carry a child. He recommends Marco stick to a low-sodium diet and refrain from strenuous exercising for the next seven months. Marco returns to his driving school and tells Lucien, his co-worker, the truth. At her salon, Irène discusses Marco's pregnancy with co-workers and clients. Later that night, the couple tells Lucas the news of Marco's pregnancy.

Back at work, Marco is contacted by Scipion Lemeu, the director of a maternity clothing company, to be the model for a new fashion line of paternity clothes. Lemeu tells his proposed plan for the new advertising campaign, in which he agrees to pay the couple ten thousand francs per month (with paid vacation) until the child is ten years old. Marco soon becomes famous worldwide, with The New York Times describing his pregnancy as "the most important event since man walked on the Moon". At an International Medical Congress, Chaumont presents Marco before a lecture hall full of doctors. During a live panel discussion, Marco, Irène, Drs. Delavigne and Chaumont, Pastor Petit, and Ferdinand Delabut, a television journalist, discuss various topics, including the recent occurrence of pregnant men, the women's liberation movement, and contraception.

Some time later, multiple cases are reported throughout France of men becoming pregnant and the risk of overpopulation is placed on high alert. The film has two different endings. In the original French version, Marco is diagnosed with having hysterical pregnancy, saddening both him and Irène. As they finally get married, Irène faints and joyfully reveals to Marco that she is pregnant. In the Italian ending, Marco realises that he has been misdiagnosed and suddenly goes into labor at his wedding, though the baby is not shown. Afterwards, men everywhere suddenly begin having pregnancy symptoms.

== Cast ==
- Catherine Deneuve as Irène de Fontenoy
- Marcello Mastroianni as Marco Mazetti
- Micheline Presle as Dr. Delavigne
- Marisa Pavan as Maria Mazetti
- Claude Melki as Lucien Soumain
- Mireille Mathieu as herself
- André Falcon as Scipion Lemeu
- Maurice Biraud as Lamarie
- Alice Sapritch as Ramona Martinez
- Raymond Gérôme as Gérard Chaumont de Latour
- Madeleine Barbulée as Miss Janvier
- Micheline Dax as Mrs. Corfa
- Benjamin Legrand as Lucas
- Jacques Legras as Leboeuf
- Tonie Marshall as Bobino host
- Marie-France Mignal as Janine
- Michèle Moretti as Ginou
- Myriam Boyer as Ninon Barbeau
- Andrée Tainsy as Clarisse de Saint-Clair
