= Martina García (bullfighter) =

19th-century Spanish woman bullfighter

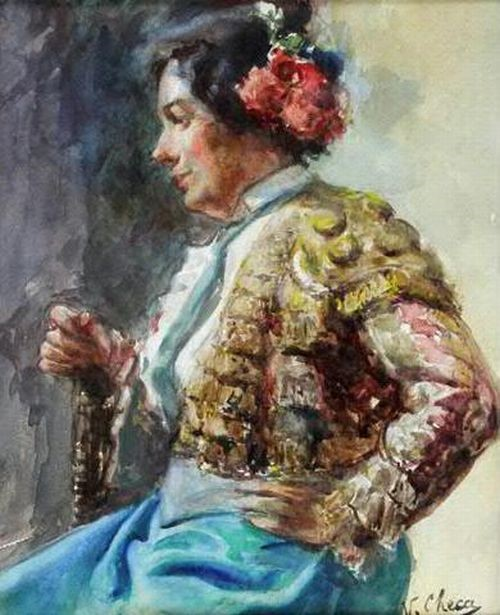
- A painting of Martina García by Ulpiano Checa

Personal information
- Nickname: Lagartijo mujeril
- Nationality: Spanish
- Born: Marta Martina García; 25 July 1814 Colmenar de Oreja, Spain
- Died: 27 July 1882 (aged 68) Madrid, Spain
- Occupation: Bullfighter
- Years active: 1837–1880

Marta Martina García (Spanish: [maˈɾia maɾˈtina ɣaɾˈθia]; 25 July 1814 – 27 July 1882) was a Spanish bullfighter known as "Lagartijo mujeril" ("Womanly Lizard") or "La Martina". She dominated all types of bullfighting, and stood out for being one of the few women bullfighters in her time who fought bulls alongside men. Antonio García-Ramos y Vázquez in Veinte temas taurinos writes that Francisco Arjona Herrera, known as "Cúchares", stands out among them.

== Discrepancies ==
Some writers are of the opinion that Martina García was born in Guillena near Seville, while others, like José María de Cossío in his work Los toros, states that her birthplace was Ciempozuelos; Pascual Millán in his work Los novillos mentions that García's point of origin was Colmenar de Oreja, near Madrid and Muriel Feiner in La mujer en el mundo del toro repeats Pascual Millán's assertion that Colmenar de Oreja was the bullfighter's birthplace.

== Biography ==
García was orphaned in 1821. In 1828 she moved to Madrid where she worked as a childminder and later, she busied herself as a cook at a bar on Madrid's Calle de Hortaleza, frequented by employees of the old Puerta de Alcalá bullring, who encouraged her to become a bullfighter.

On 15 January 1837, García had her début as a banderillera, dressed as a working-class woman, with a short skirt and no pants. On 5 November of the same year, she did a repeat performance as a banderillera together with Rosa Inard, and picadoras Magdalena García and Antonia García; for this performance, Martina García earned two hundred reales. On Christmas Day, there was another repeat performance with the same women sharing the billing.

On 18 February 1838, García fought for the first time as a matadora against fighting bulls as a mojiganga (a pantomime representation which was done at the time before novilladas whose origin was in the 16th century) accompanied by her own cuadrilla (team of banderilleras and picadoras) which was made up wholly of women such as Rosa Inard and Celedonia Marina, and once again she earned two hundred reales for her efforts. On 11 March 1838, she took part in Madrid in a novillada embolada (meaning that a yearling bull's horns were tipped with wooden balls) with the mojigangas representing "The Doctor and the Nurse", afterwards assisting with her cape in the fight with a yearling bull. She appeared shortly thereafter in another novillada playing Dulcinea del Toboso in a representation of Don Quijote de la Mancha.

On 26 January 1845, García, dressed in the old French style, shared billing with Teresa and Magdalena García, Rosa Inard and Manuela Renaud as banderilleras. She performed again in Madrid in 1846 with the women mojiganga bullfighters. On 4 February 1849, she performed in Madrid clad in a suit of lights, sharing billing with the bullfighter María, "La Gitana Cantarina" ("The Gipsy Woman Singer"). García's last performance there was on 16 August 1874 with José Giraldez, "Jaqueta", in the last celebration held at the now vanished Puerta de Alcalá bullring — which was torn down the next day. Critics at the time agreed that she had been intrepid and serene when facing bulls.

On 16 April 1874, García did her last mojiganga bullfight with Juana López and Tomasa Prieto as picadoras – riding donkeys rather than the customary horses – and Rosa Campos along with Javiera Bidaurre as banderilleras; García herself was the matadora.

García forwent any apoderado ("manager" or "agent") who could have worked out contracts for her. For her abilities, the bullfighter was compared to male bullfighter Lagartijo (1841–1900) according to what Pascual Millán wrote in his work Los novillos ("The Bull Calves"). García's bullfighting career has been compared to bullfighter Pedro Romero's (1754–1839) for its length, even though her own career, which lasted some forty years, was quite a bit longer than his. Despite having retired some months earlier she once again put herself before a bull on 7 November 1874, when she was sixty years old. However, she definitively retired from the bullring in 1880 at the age of sixty-six.

García was targeted by all kinds of detractors, from journalists to bullfighting writers. The critic Federico Dominguín, for instance, called her an "unfortunate matadora and old woman". Natalio Rivas, on the other hand, said that her long career was steeped in great courage, if little in the way of artistry.

She fought yearling bulls, toros embolados and bare-horned bulls; she dominated different aspects of bullfighting with skill and fluency. She fought alongside men in mixed corridas, among them Cúchares, who mentioned her courage and what little knowledge the bullfighter had of bulls. Pascual Millán spoke of her as an institution, and she was also mentioned by Benito Pérez Galdós. Conserved at the Biblioteca Nacional de España is the document in which García sought permission to fight bulls.

== See also ==
- Alternativa
- List of female bullfighters
- Bullfighting
- Bullfighter

== Bibliography ==
- Feiner, Muriel (1995). La mujer en el mundo del toro. Madrid: Alianza. pp. 47–49. ISBN 84-206-9440-1. OCLC 489945438.
- Sánchez de Neira, José (1879). Gran diccionario taurómaco (in Spanish). Madrid: R. Velasco, Imp., ed. pp. 130–131, 272, 321.
- Millán, Pascual (1892). "XIV. 1836 y 1937". Los novillos. Madrid: Imprenta Moderna. pp. 116–255.
- Nieto Manjón, Luis (2004). Diccionario Espasa. Términos taurinos (in Spanish). Madrid: Espasa. p. 418. ISBN 9788467014204. OCLC 254025712.
