= Hilda Tenorio =

Mexican bullfighter and matador (born 1986)

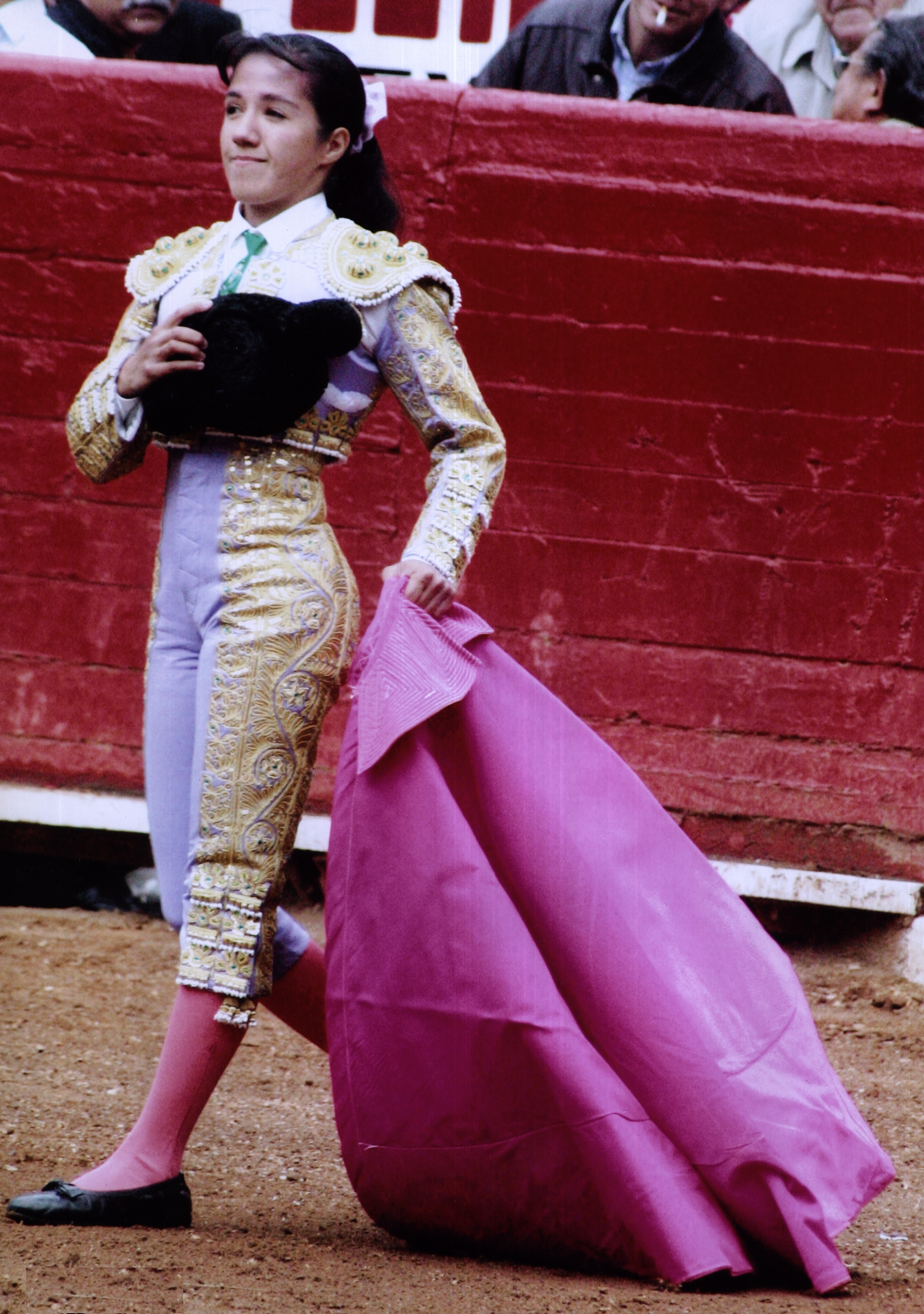
- Hilda Tenorio on the bullring

Personal information
- Born: Hilda Eliana Tenorio Patiño; June 11, 1986 (age 40) Morelia, Michoacán, Mexico
- Height: 158 cm (5 ft 2 in)

Sport
- Sport: Bullfighting
- Rank: Matador

Hilda Eliana Tenorio Patiño (born June 11, 1986) is a Mexican bullfighter and matadora. She was the first woman to receive her alternativa in the Plaza de Toros México, the largest bullring in the world, aged 24. Tenorio completed her alternativa on February 28, 2010. She has been an outspoken advocate of feminism in the sport. She is the third Mexican woman to attain the rank of matador.

== Life and career ==
=== Early life and education ===
Hilda Eliana Tenorio Patiño was born in Morelia, Michoacán, Mexico on June 11, 1986, the daughter of Fernando Tenorio Cabrera and Hilda Patiño. In her youth, Tenorio performed well in academic settings, receiving various recognitions in elementary, middle and high school, where she received the Premio Padre de la Patria, a local award given in Michoacán.

She studied law at the Universidad Michoacana de San Nicolás de Hidalgo where she graduated with a honors law degree.

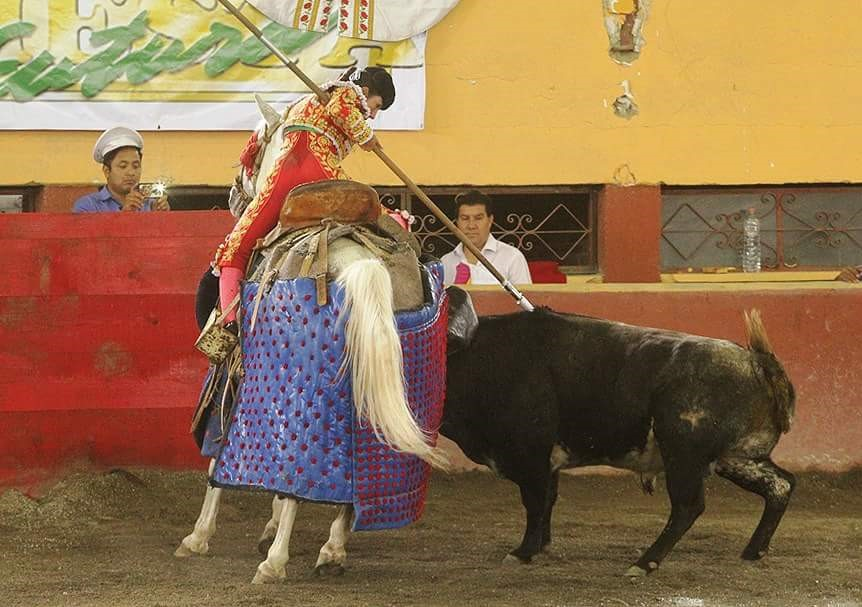
Hilda Tenorio performing a picada on one of her bulls, 2016.

=== Early bullfighting career ===
From the age of 13 she became interested in bullfighting, and after several months training with her teacher Rutilo Morales, her first performance as a becerrista occurred on May 30, 2001 in Salvatierra, Guanajuato, where she alternated with Joselito Adame.

=== Professional career ===
After an extensive tour as a becerrista throughout Mexico, where she even fought in two evenings in the Plaza de Toros México, she officially debuted as a bullfighter on October 10, 2003, the afternoon in which she exited the bullring on the shoulders of men, a traditional practice in bullfighting when the bullfighter's performance was well-received.

Also in October, on the 19th, on the same stage, she went around the ring for a pair of banderillas in a performance that was later attributed as her invention: "The Double Pair" (Spanish: El par doble). She is the winner of the 2003, 2004 and 2005 novillero seasons of the Plaza de Toros México.

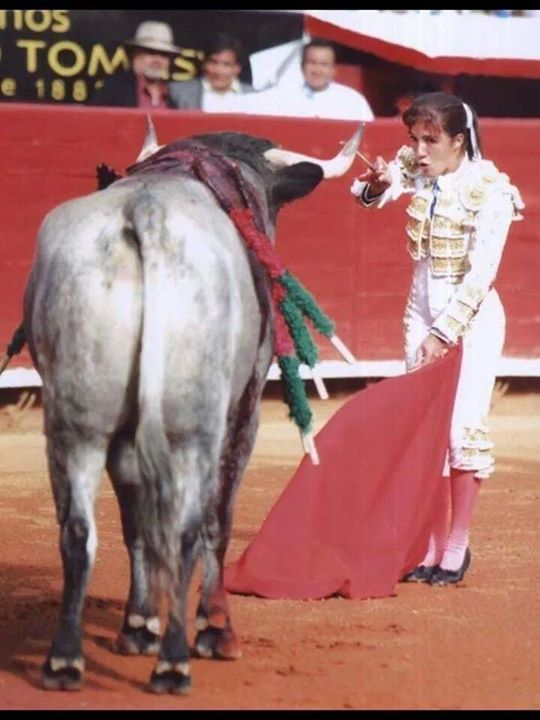
Hilda Tenorio with her fully grown bull in her alternativa fight, 2010.

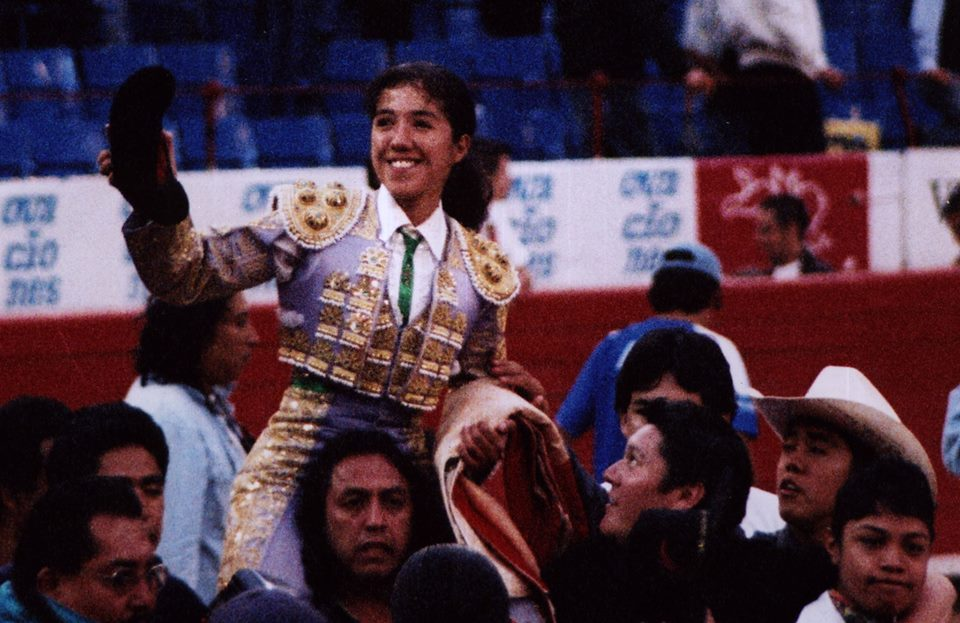
Hilda Tenorio in exiting at the Plaza de Toros México, 2015.

In 2005, she was the first woman to cut three bulls ears in a single afternoon in the Plaza de Toros México, ending a 10-year draught among, mostly male, bullfighters. On February 28, 2010 Tenorio became the first woman to become a bullfighter in the "cathedral of bullfighting" in Mexico in 64 years. She received her alternativa from the hands of Manolo Mejía and a witness from Almería, Ruiz Manuel, with bulls from the Autrique ranch she grew up on. That afternoon, she became the first bullfighter to cut an ear in the Plaza México and exited on the shoulders of men.

On May 8, 2010 she appeared in Saltillo, Coahuila, with a victory against bulls from the San Martín livestock. In relation to her performance, the bullfighting journalist Don Julio Téllez, claimed in the Toros y toreros program of the Instituto Politécnico Nacional: "Hilda Tenorio is the most important female bullfighter in universal bullfighting history."

On May 15, 2016 in Tepotzotlán, Mexico, she became the first and only woman to perform an encerrona, that is, she alone dealt with the entire bullfight against six bulls.

On May 3, 2019 she was seriously injured by a goring received during a presentation in the Plaza del Relicario in Puebla. She received several facial injuries after the bull pushed into her as she was kneeling before it. Tenorio spoke shortly after the incident, confirming that her "upper jaw [was] broken and [her] cheeks [were] fractured".

== See also ==
- List of female bullfighters
