= Bette Ford =

American actress (born 1927)

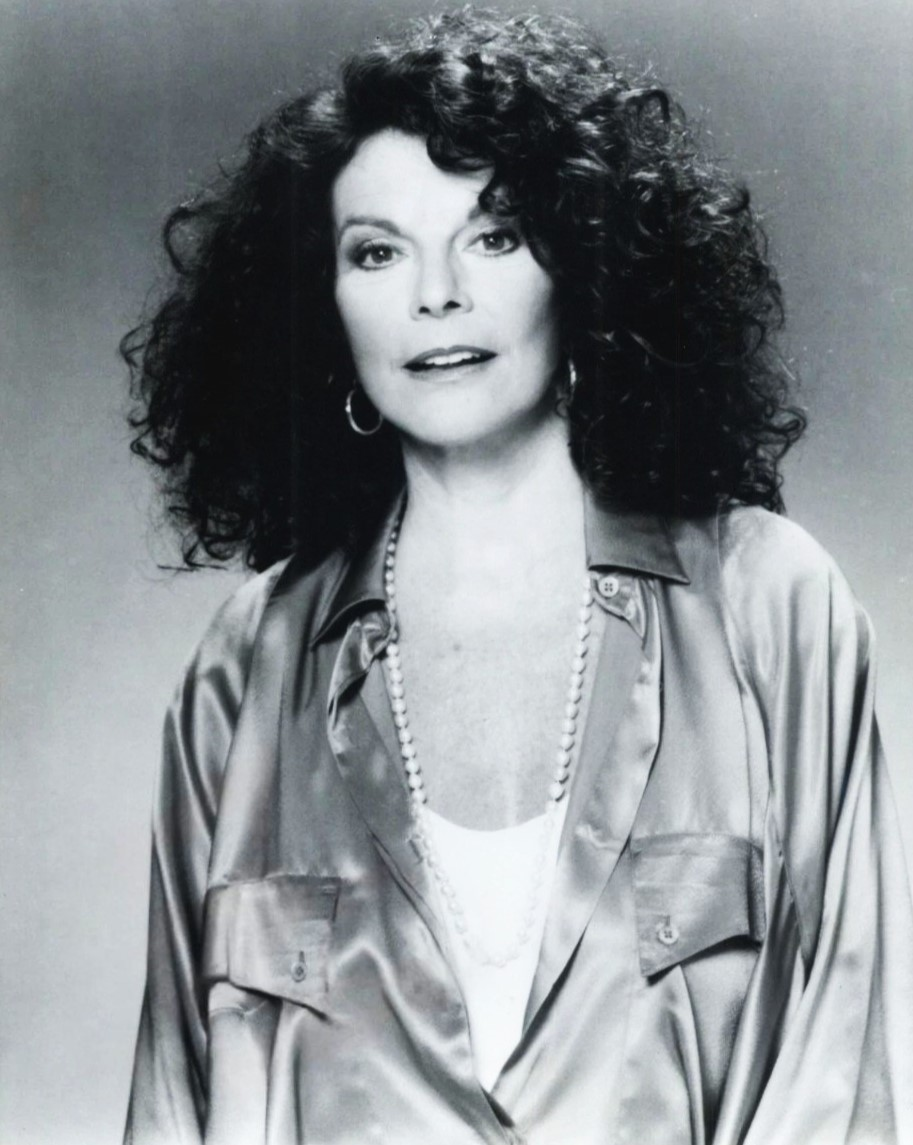
- Born: Harriet Elizabeth Dingeldein; June 24, 1927 (age 99); McKeesport, Pennsylvania, U.S.
- Occupations: Actress; matador
- Years active: 1954–1958 (bullfighting); 1968–2018 (acting)
- Spouse: David Ford (m. 1945; div. 1946) John Meston (m. 1958; div. 1973) Scott Wolkoff

Bette Ford (born Harriet Elizabeth Dingeldein; June 24, 1927) is an American actress, model and professional bullfighter. She was the first American woman to fight on foot in the Plaza México, the world's largest bullfight arena.

== Personal life ==
Born as Harriet Elizabeth Dingeldein in McKeesport, Pennsylvania, in 1927, she and her brother were raised by relatives after being abandoned, first by their mother and then later by their father. Shortly after moving to New York at the age of 18, she married another actor, David Ford, whose name she would keep, although the marriage ended after nine months. She later married John Meston (July 30, 1914 – March 24, 1979) an American radio and television writer best known for co-creating (with Norman Macdonnell), the long-running radio/TV series, Gunsmoke. Ford's third and current husband is Scott Wolkoff (born May 27, 1947), some two decades her junior.

== Early modelling and acting career ==
After graduating from high school in 1945, she began her career as a model and actress in New York, where her modelling credits included stints as The Jantzen Bathing Suit Girl, The Camay Bride and The Parliament Cigarette Girl, and her acting credits included appearances as a regular on The Jackie Gleason Show and The Jimmy Durante Show.

== Bullfighting career ==
While on a modelling photo shoot in Bogotá, Colombia, Ford was introduced to the renowned matador Luis Miguel Dominguín and watched him fight in the ring. Soon after, Ford left New York for Mexico to train as a bullfighter. In 1954, Warner Bros made a documentary short about her training, Beauty and the Bull.

Ford's historic debut at the Plaza México was followed by several years of fighting as a figura (bullfighting celebrity) in Mexico and the Philippines. The studio MGM, which had offered her an acting contract before she left New York to become a bullfighter, planned a full-length feature film based on her life story, and sent several writers, among them John Meston, the co-creator of Gunsmoke, to meet with Ford and discuss a screenplay. Ford married Meston shortly after they met and then retired as a bullfighter.

== Post-bullfighting acting career ==
Ford has appeared in feature films including the Clint-Eastwood-directed Sudden Impact and Honkytonk Man, and television series including Cheers, L.A. Law, Melrose Place, and Felicity. Her voice can be heard in The Animatrix, the companion animated DVD of the film trilogy The Matrix, and numerous commercials.

== Selected filmography ==
- Beauty and the Bull (1954, Short) .... Bette Ford
- Death Valley Days (1968, TV Series) .... Millie
- Emergency! (1977, TV Series) .... Juen Edwards
- James at 15 (1977, TV Series) .... Mrs. Droste
- Honkytonk Man (1982) .... Lulu
- Falcon Crest (1983, TV Series) .... Prison Guard
- Sudden Impact (1983) .... Leah
- Emerald Point N.A.S. (1984, TV Series) .... Mrs. Randolph
- St. Elsewhere (1984, TV Series) .... Pat Kroll
- Cheers (1984, TV Series) .... Irene Blanchard
- Crazy Like a Fox (1985, TV Series)
- Hotel (1985, TV Series) .... Mrs. Fielding
- Crime Story (1987, TV Series) .... Angie / Bartender
- A Year in the Life (1987, TV Series) .... Jackie
- L.A. Law (1987-1988, TV Series) .... Rusty Farrell
- Major Dad (1989, TV Series) ... Mom
- Hunter (1990, TV Series) ... Anna Scarlatti
- The Fresh Prince of Bel-Air (1990, TV Series) ... Madame Chatchka
- Marked for Death (1990) .... Kate Hatcher
- Lucy & Desi: Before the Laughter (1991) .... DeDe Ball
- The Commish (1992, TV Series) .... Irene Wallerstein
- The Wonder Years (1992, TV Series) ... Aunt Muriel
- Melrose Place (1993, TV Series) .... Mrs. Wilson
- Tales from the Crypt (1994, TV Series) .... Mrs. Peterson
- Season of Change (1994) .... Granny Upton
- Thunder Alley (1995, TV Series) .... Wanda
- Party of Five (1995, TV Series) .... Miss Corso
- It Was Him or Us (1995, TV Movie) .... Maggie Shepard
- A Face to Die For (1996, TV Movie) .... Mrs. Berman
- Nash Bridges (1996, TV Series)
- Promised Land .... (1997, TV Series) .... Marie Jasper
- A River Made to Drown In (1997) .... Lady with Whip
- The Landlady (1998) .... Justine Welch
- Two Guys, a Girl and a Pizza Place (1998, TV Series) .... Marge Ryecart
- My Engagement Party (1998) .... Estelle Salsburg
- Providence (1999, TV Series) .... Hildy
- ER (2001, TV Series) .... Princess Taffeta
- Felicity (2001, TV Series) .... Professor May
- The Division (2002, TV Series) .... Mrs. Sanders
- Final Flight of the Osiris (2003, Short) .... Old Woman (English version, voice)
- The Animatrix (2003) .... Old Woman (segment "Final Flight of the Osiris") (voice)
- Valley of the Sun (2011) .... Bunny McGill

== See also ==
- Patricia McCormick (1927–2013), American woman professional bullfighter
- List of female bullfighters
