= Antoine Bourseiller =

French actor and opera and theatre director

Antoine Bourseiller (8 July 1930 – 21 May 2013) was a French actor and opera and theatre director.

Born in Paris in 1930, from 1960 to 1963 Bourseiller headed the Studio des Champs-Elysées. In 1966, he was named director of the Centre dramatique national d'Aix-en-Provence. He also directed the Théâtre Récamier. From 1982 until 1996 he was director of the Opéra de Nancy et de Lorraine.

Bourseiller won the Prix du Concours des Jeunes compagnies in 1960 and the Grand Prix du théâtre du Syndicat de la critique in 1963.

== Personal life ==
He had a daughter, Rosalie Varda, from his relationship with director Agnès Varda. He had a second daughter, the rejoneadora (bullfighter) Marie Sara (born Marie Bourseiller), from his marriage to actress Chantal Darget (born Marie Chantal Chauvet). From this marriage he also had a stepson, Christophe Bourseiller (born Christophe Gintzburger).

== Partial filmography as actor ==
- L'Opéra-Mouffe (short) by Agnès Varda (1958)
- Cléo from 5 to 7 by Agnès Varda (1962)
- Masculin féminin by Jean-Luc Godard (1966)
- The War Is Over by Alain Resnais (1966)
- Moi, Pierre Rivière, ayant égorgé ma mère, ma sœur et mon frère... by René Allio (1975)
- A Bad Son by Claude Sautet (1980)
- Clara et les Chics Types by Jacques Monnet (1981)
- Three Seats for the 26th by Jacques Demy (1988)

== Filmography as director ==
- Marie Soleil (1966)
- Jean Genet: Entretien avec Antoine Bourseiller (Jean Genet: An Interview with Antoine Bourseiller) (1981)
