= Clara et les Chics Types =

- Directed by: Jacques Monnet
- Written by: Jean-Loup Dabadie
- Produced by: Alain Poiré
- Starring: Daniel Auteuil; Josiane Balasko; Christophe Bourseiller; Christian Clavier; Thierry Lhermitte; Isabelle Adjani
- Cinematography: Yves Lafaye
- Edited by: Pierre Gillette
- Music by: Michel Jonasz
- Distributed by: Gaumont Distribution
- Release date: 14 January 1981
- Running time: 110 minutes
- Country: France
- Language: French
- Box office: $3 million

Clara et les Chics Types is a 1981 French comedy drama directed by Jacques Monnet.

== Plot ==
In Grenoble, Mickey, Bertrand, Frederick, Charles, Louise and Aimee, united by a common love of music, form a group, the Why Notes. One day, Bertrand remarked Clara, when she fled to the church which is celebrated her marriage to a wealthy entrepreneur. A few hours later, as the band prepares to go on stage in Paris, Bertrand finds Clara who offers to fly with her and disappears ... Bertrand, completely captivated by Clara leaves the group and goes looking for her.

== Cast ==
- Daniel Auteuil – Mickey
- Josiane Balasko – Louise
- Christophe Bourseiller – Frédéric
- Christian Clavier – Charles
- Thierry Lhermitte – Bertrand
- Marianne Sergent – Aimée
- Isabelle Adjani – Clara
- Monique Chaumette – Louise's mother
- Antoine Bourseiller – Louise's father
- Frédérique Tirmont – Edith
- Michel Pilorgé – Edith's husband
- Denise Noël – Frederic's mother
- Roland Giraud – Paul
- Philippe Nahon – A cop
