= Line of Sight (film) =

- Directed by: Jean-Daniel Pollet
- Written by: Jean-Daniel Pollet
- Starring: Pierre Assier; Michèle Mercier; Édith Scob
- Cinematography: Jean-Jacques Rochut
- Edited by: François Bel; Jean-Daniel Pollet
- Music by: Pierre Assier
- Production company: Lumi-Films
- Release date: 1960
- Running time: 74 minutes
- Country: France
- Language: French

Line of Sight (French: La ligne de mire) is a 1960 French drama film directed by Jean-Daniel Pollet and starring Pierre Assier, Michèle Mercier and Édith Scob.

== Cast ==
- Pierre Assier as Pedro
- Michèle Mercier as Hélène
- Édith Scob as Pascale
- Remy Jussan as Bernard
- Joël Holmès as Marc
- Michel Gonzalès as Henri
- Pierre Jourdan as M. Gordo
- Charles Millot as The leader of the gang
- Véra Belmont as Pedro's friend
- Hugues Wanner as The hunter
- Claude Melki and Yves Barsacq as The weirds castle men
- Georges Mazauric
- André Philip
- Henri Poirier

== Bibliography ==
- Maurice Bessy & Raymond Chirat. Histoire du cinéma français: 1956–1960. Pygmalion, 1990.
