= Conchita Cintrón =

Peruvian female bullfighter (1922–2009)

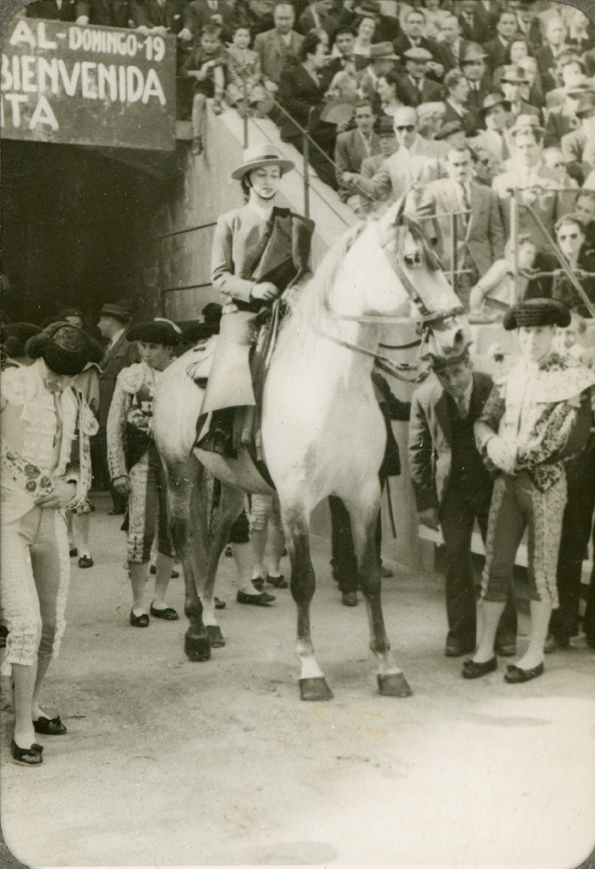
- Conchita entering a bullring in Segovia, Spain
- Born: August 9, 1922; Antofagasta, Chile
- Died: February 17, 2009 (aged 86); Lisbon, Portugal
- Resting place: Trajouce, Lisbon, Portugal
- Occupations: Professional bullfighter, journalist, dog breeder
- Years active: 1936-1950
- Spouse: Francisco de Castelo Branco
- Children: Six
- Parents: Francisco Cintrón Ramos; Lola Kathleen Verrill

Concepción Cintrón Verrill, also known as Conchita Cintrón or La Diosa de Oro ('The Golden Goddess') (August 9, 1922 – February 17, 2009), was a Chile-born Peruvian torera (female bullfighter), perhaps the most famous in the history of bullfighting. In the ring Cintrón was said to display particular grace, style and bravado, a combination known as duende.

== Background ==
Cintrón was born in 1922 in Antofagasta, in northern Chile. Her father, Francisco Cintrón Ramos, was from Puerto Rico and the second Puerto Rican to graduate from West Point, Major General Luis R. Esteves being the first. After serving in the United States military he became a South American businessman. Her mother, Lola Kathleen Verrill, was an American of Irish ancestry. By the time she was three years old, the family had moved to Lima, Peru, where she grew up, learned to ride, and began her career as a bullfighter.

In Lima, Cintrón rode her first pony at three, and joined the riding school of the Portuguese rejoneador Ruy da Câmara, an immigrant to Peru, at 11. Cámara also became her bullfighting teacher. She trained originally as a rejoneadora, a bullfighter from horseback. This is one form of bullfighting practiced in Portugal.

== Her career outside of Spain ==
Cintrón first fought in public in the Plaza de Acho, in Lima, in January 1936. On July 31, 1938, she made her debut as a novillera, also in Lima. This event established her as a professional rejoneadora, a rare (but not unprecedented) honor for a woman. After a trip to Portugal, she was invited to perform in Mexico. She made her Mexico City debut at the Plaza del Toreo on August 20, 1938. She failed to kill her bull, but nevertheless was a great hit with the crowd and the taurine critics. She was reported to have "caused pandemonium in the stands".

Cintrón was gored in 1940 in Mexico City, by the bull Chiclanero. She fainted and was taken to the infirmary, but refused surgery and returned to the ring. There with one quick thrust she dispatched the bull and collapsed.

From her Mexico City debut in 1938 through the 1940s, Cintrón was a big draw on the bullfighting circuit, in Mexico, Portugal, France, Ecuador, Venezuela, Colombia, and Spanish Morocco. She even fought once in the United States, near San Francisco, in a corrida in which the bull was not allowed to be killed.

== Career ==
Poster of Conchita Cintron.

Cintrón also fought in Spain, but there were laws there intended to ban female bullfighters. The laws, however, specified only the Spanish form of bullfighting, in which the bull is killed from on foot, not from horseback. Thus it was legal for her to fight there as a rejoneadora, but not as a matadora. (In other countries she did fight as a matadora.) Her popularity in Spain was also great, and eventually officials there found ways around the laws; she did sometimes fight on foot at charity events not open to the public. Her official presentation in Spain was in Seville on April 23, 1945.

The Spanish prohibition against women matadors was said to be motivated more by the possibility they would have to be partially uncovered before the crowd in the event of a cornada (goring) than as a precaution for their safety (this was during the government of Francisco Franco).

Cintrón intended the final corrida of the 1949 season, in Jaén, Spain, to be the last of her career. She appeared in the ring together with the matadors Manolo Vázquez and Antonio Ordóñez. After performing on horseback with the bull, Cintrón rode to the box of the presidente and asked for permission to dismount for the kill. Permission was denied. This was her signal to leave the arena, and leave the killing of the bull to the novillero assigned to her for that task. Instead, she dismounted, grabbed his sword and muleta, caped the bull and prepared it for the kill. She actually went in for the kill and then dramatically let the sword drop to the sand. The bull charged. Cintrón stepped from his path and simulated the kill by touching his shoulders with her fingers as he rushed by. Pandemonium erupted in the stands and the audience threw hats and red carnations at her feet. The novillero then entered the ring and performed the kill, as originally planned.

Cintrón walked calmly away from the bull and was arrested as she left the ring, for violating the law banning women from fighting on foot. With the audience on the verge of rioting in protest of her arrest, the regional governor pardoned her and she was released. It was one of the most dramatic moments in bullfighting history. As Orson Welles wrote in the introduction to her memoirs, her career "ended in a single burst of glorious criminality. You can't keep a lady waiting forever, and there came an afternoon when she decided that she'd waited long enough."

Cintrón's final fight in Spain was on October 18, 1950. During her career she killed more than 750 bulls.

== Personal life ==
In 1950, Cintrón married Francisco de Castelo Branco, a Portuguese nobleman, a nephew of her teacher, Ruy da Cámara, and settled in Portugal, acquiring Portuguese nationality. The couple had six children:

- Pedro
- Ana Mafalda
- Ruy
- Francisco
- Fernando
- João

== Later years ==
In Portugal at Quinta do Índio, near Setúbal, Conchita dedicated herself to writing her memoirs, to journalism - being the Portuguese correspondent of several Latin American newspapers and the breeding of dogs primarily Portuguese Pointers with great success.

In the early sixties the success of Quinta do Índio dogs caught the eye of Vasco Bensaúde, businessman, shipowner and dog breeder who had started 30 years earlier to save the Portuguese Water Dog from extinction in his Algarbiorum kennel. Not having heirs interested in the kennel, Bensaúde bequeathed it to Conchita Cintrón in 1967. Having registered the kennel with the name Al-Gharb, Conchita, taking advantage of her extensive contacts in North American high-society publicized the breed in the US with great success.

In 1975 and as a consequence of the 25th of April Revolution, Quinta do Índio was occupied by workers and radical leftist supporters who drove out the family. Of the 32 existing water dogs only 15 were rescued 6 months later but in such a bad condition that all had to be euthanized. With the occupation of the property, Cintrón and family left Portugal and went into exile in Mexico until the end of the eighties.

Cintrón died on February 17, 2009, from cardiac arrest in Lisbon, Portugal. She was buried in Trajouce, near Lisbon.

== Quotes ==
- "Her record stands as a rebuke to every man of us who has ever maintained that a woman must lose something of her femininity if she seeks to compete with men." —Orson Welles.

== See also ==
- List of female bullfighters
- List of Puerto Ricans
