= Jacques Demy =

French film director (1931–1990)

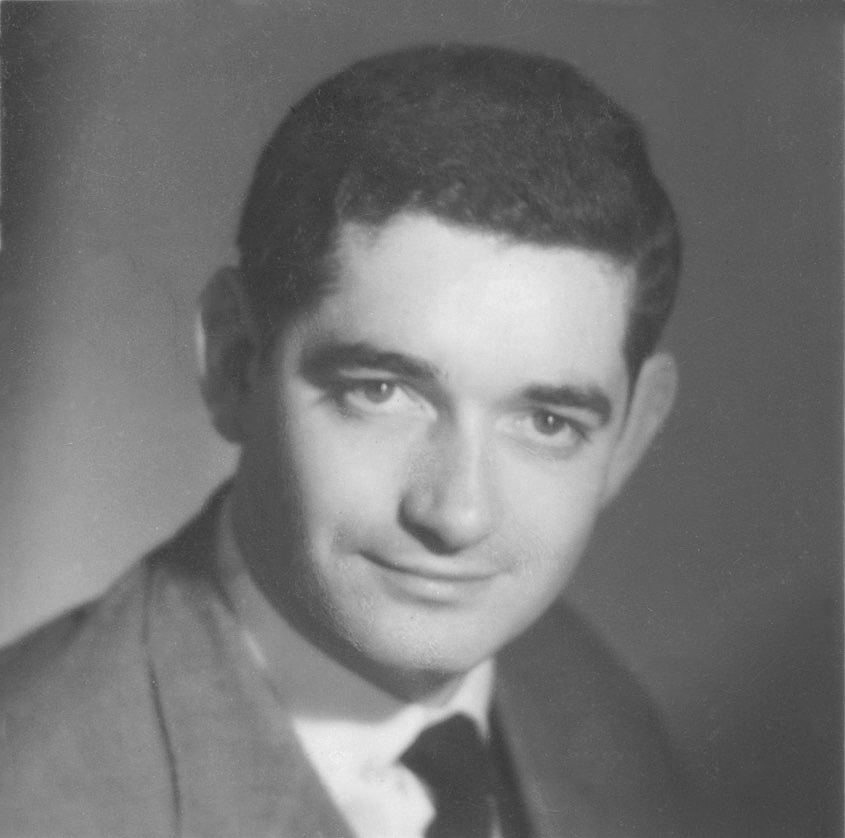
- Demy in 1956
- Born: 5 June 1931; Pontchâteau, France
- Died: 27 October 1990 (aged 59); Paris, France
- Resting place: Montparnasse Cemetery, Paris, France
- Occupations: Film director; screenwriter
- Years active: 1955–1988
- Movement: French New Wave
- Spouse: Agnès Varda (m. 1962)
- Children: Rosalie Varda (step-daughter); Mathieu Demy

Jacques Demy (French: [ʒak dəmi]; 5 June 1931 – 27 October 1990) was a French director, screenwriter and lyricist. He appeared at the height of the French New Wave alongside contemporaries like Jean-Luc Godard and François Truffaut. Demy's films are celebrated for their visual style, which drew upon diverse sources such as classic Hollywood musicals, the plein-air realism of his French New Wave colleagues, fairy tales, jazz, Japanese manga, and the opera. His films contain overlapping continuity (i.e., characters cross over from film to film), lush musical scores (typically composed by Michel Legrand) and motifs like teenage love, labor rights, chance encounters, incest, and the intersection between dreams and reality. He was married to Agnès Varda, another prominent director of the French New Wave. Demy is best known for the two musicals he directed in the mid-1960s: The Umbrellas of Cherbourg (1964) and The Young Girls of Rochefort (1967).

== Career ==
After working with the animator Paul Grimault and the filmmaker Georges Rouquier, Demy directed Lola, his first feature film, in 1961, with Anouk Aimée playing the eponymous cabaret singer. The Demy universe emerges here: Characters burst into song (courtesy of composer and lifelong Demy-collaborator Michel Legrand); iconic Hollywood imagery is appropriated, as in the opening scene with the man in a white Stetson in the Cadillac; plot is dictated by the director's fascination with fate and stock themes of chance encounters and long-lost love; and the setting, as with many of Demy's films, is the French Atlantic coast of his childhood, specifically the seaport town of Nantes.

La Baie des Anges (The Bay of Angels, 1963), starring Jeanne Moreau, took the theme of fate further, with its story of love at the roulette tables.

Demy is perhaps best known for his original musical Les Parapluies de Cherbourg (The Umbrellas of Cherbourg, 1964), with a score by Legrand. The whimsical concept of singing all the dialogue sets the tone for this tragedy of the everyday. The film also sees the emergence of Demy's trademark visual style, shot in saturated supercolour, with every detail—neckties, wallpaper, Catherine Deneuve's bleached-blonde hair—selected for visual impact. Roland Cassard, the young man from Lola (Marc Michel) reappears here, marrying Deneuve's character. Such reappearances are typical of Demy's work. Kurt Vonnegut was a huge fan of Les Parapluies, writing in private correspondence: "I saw The Umbrellas of Cherbourg, which I took very hard. To an unmoored, middle-aged man like myself, it was heart-breaking. That's all right. I like to have my heart broken."

Demy's subsequent films never quite captured audience and critical acclaim the way Les Parapluies did, although he continued to make ambitious and original dramas and musicals. Les Demoiselles de Rochefort (1967), another whimsical-yet-melancholic musical, features Deneuve and her sister Françoise Dorléac as sisters living in the seaside town of Rochefort, daughters of Danielle Darrieux. It was shot in color widescreen CinemaScope and featured an Oscar-nominated musical score as well as dance appearances by Gene Kelly and West Side Story's George Chakiris.

In 1968, after Columbia Pictures gave Demy a lucrative offer to shoot his first film in America, he and his wife, film director Agnès Varda, moved to Los Angeles briefly. Demy's movie was a naturalistic drama: 1969's Model Shop. Lola (Anouk Aimée) reappears, her dreams shattered, her life having taken a turn for the worse. Abandoned by her husband Michel for a female gambler named Jackie Demaistre (Jeanne Moreau's character from Bay of Angels), Lola is scrounging to make enough money to return to France and her child by working as a nude model in a backdoor model-shop on the Sunset Strip. She runs into an aimless, young architect (Gary Lockwood), who navigates the streets of Los Angeles; like Lola, he is looking for love and meaning in life. Model Shop is a time capsule of late-1960s Los Angeles and documents the death of the hippie movement, the Vietnam draft, and the ennui and misery that results from broken relationships. This bleakness and decided lack of whimsy—uncharacteristic for Demy—had a large amount to do with Model Shop's critical and commercial failure.

Peau d'Âne (Donkey Skin, 1970) was a step in the opposite direction as a visually extravagant musical interpretation of a classic French fairy tale which highlights the tale's incestuous overtones, starring Deneuve, Jean Marais, and Delphine Seyrig. It was Demy's first foray into the world of fairy tales and historical fantasia, which he explored in The Pied Piper and Lady Oscar.

Although none of Demy's subsequent films captured the contemporary success of his earlier work, some have been reappraised: David Thomson wrote about "the fascinating application of the operatic technique to an unusually dark story" in Une chambre en ville (A Room in Town, 1982). L'événement le plus important depuis que l'homme a marché sur la lune (1973) ("A Slightly Pregnant Man") is a look back at the pressures of second-wave feminism in France and the fears it elicited in men. Lady Oscar (1979), based on the Japanese manga series The Rose of Versailles, has been discussed and analyzed for its queer and political subtext (the title character is born female, her father raises her as a male so she can get ahead in 18th-century French aristocracy, and she eventually falls in love with her surrogate brother, a working-class revolutionary).

Parapluies de Cherbourg has been color-restored twice from original prints by Demy. In 2014, The Criterion Collection released a boxed set of Demy's "essential" work, with hours of supplements, essays, and restored image and sound. The films include Lola, Bay of Angels, The Umbrellas of Cherbourg, The Young Girls of Rochefort, Donkey Skin, and Une Chambre en Ville as well as most of Demy's early short films.

== Personal life ==
As a student, Demy did not learn any foreign languages. In the 1960s, with the help of some classes, internships, and spending some time in the United States, he learned English. At the time of the Anouchka project, which took many years to complete, he also learned Russian. In the early 1970s, taking after the example of Michel Legrand, he earned his private pilot's license for passenger planes.

Jacques Demy was bisexual. In 1958, Jacques Demy and Agnès Varda met at a short film festival in Tours. The two married in 1962. They had a son together, Mathieu Demy (born 1972), and Demy also adopted Varda's daughter, Rosalie Varda (born 1958), whom she had with Antoine Bourseiller in a previous relationship. Together, Demy and Varda owned a home in Paris and another property with an old mill on the Noirmoutier Island in Vendée, where the shots of Demy on a beach in Jacquot de Nantes (1991) were taken. The film is a version of Demy's autobiographical notebooks, an account of Demy's childhood and his lifelong love of theatre and cinema. Varda paid homage to her husband in Jacquot de Nantes, Les demoiselles ont eu 25 ans (1993), and L'Univers de Jacques Demy (1995).

Demy died on October 27, 1990, at the age of 59. Originally, it was reported that he died of cancer, but in 2008 Varda revealed that Demy died of HIV/AIDS. He was buried at the Montparnasse Cemetery in Paris.

== Filmography ==
=== Film ===
Year	English title	Director	Writer	Original title
1961	Lola	Yes	Yes	
1963	Bay of Angels	Yes	Yes	La Baie des Anges
1964	The Umbrellas of Cherbourg	Yes	Yes	Les Parapluies de Cherbourg
1967	The Young Girls of Rochefort	Yes	Yes	Les Demoiselles de Rochefort
1969	Model Shop	Yes	Yes	
1970	Donkey Skin	Yes	Yes	Peau d'Âne
1972	The Pied Piper	Yes	Yes	
1973	A Slightly Pregnant Man	Yes	Yes	L'événement le plus important depuis que l'homme a marché sur la lune
1979	Lady Oscar	Yes	Yes	
1982	A Room in Town	Yes	Yes	Une chambre en ville
1985	Parking	Yes	Yes	
1988	The Turntable	Yes	Yes	La table tournante
1988	Three Seats for the 26th	Yes	Yes	Trois places pour le 26

=== Short films ===
Year	English title	Director	Writer	Original title	Notes
1951	Dead Horizons	Yes	Yes	Les horizons morts	
1956	The clog maker of the Loire Valley	Yes	Yes	Le sabotier du Val de Loire	Documentary short
1957	The Beautiful Indifferent	Yes	No	Le bel indifférent	
1958	Grévin Museum	Yes	No	Musée Grévin	
1959	Mother and Child	Yes	No	La mère et l'enfant	
1959	Ars	Yes	Yes	Ars	Documentary short
1962	Lust	Yes	Yes	La luxure	An episode in The Seven Deadly Sins

=== Television ===
Year	English title	Director	Writer	Original title	Notes
1980	Break of Day	Yes	Yes	La Naissance du Jour	Part of Le roman du samedi. Television movie.

== Awards and honors ==
- 1963 : Louis Delluc Prize for Les Parapluies de Cherbourg
- 1964 : Golden Palm at the Cannes Film Festival for Les Parapluies de Cherbourg

On 5 June 2019, on Demy's 88th birthday, he was honored with a Google Doodle.
