= Conchi Ríos =

Spanish bullfighter (born 1991)

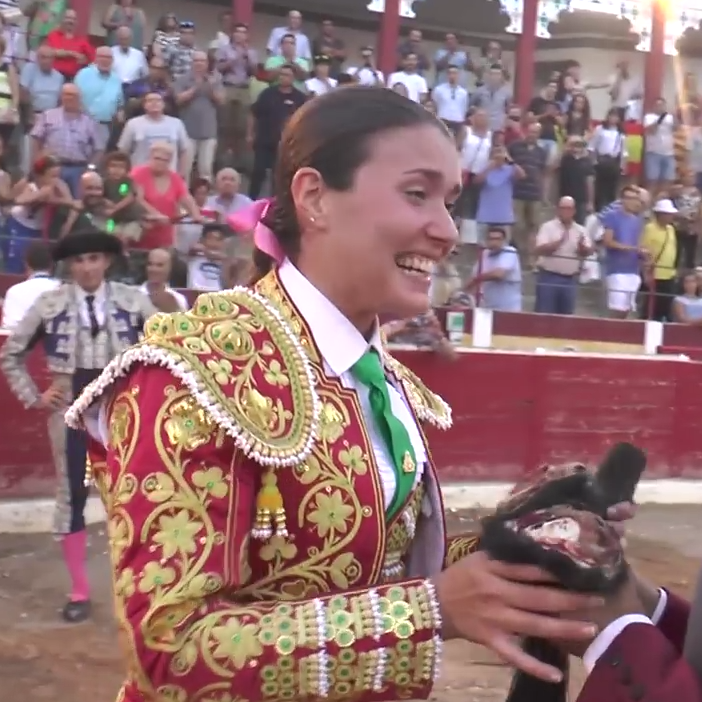
- Conchi Ríos in Cehegín in 2016
- Born: 11 March 1991 (age 35); Region of Murcia
- Occupation: Bullfighting
- Partner: Jose Manuel Mas

Conchi Reyes Ríos (born 11 March 1991) is a Spanish bullfighter. In 2011, she was the first woman to take two ears off a bull. In 2015, she was featured on a Spanish national list of bullfighters, one of six women out of 825.

== Biography ==
Ríos was born in the Region of Murcia in 1991. Her grandparents learnt of her ambition to be a bullfighter when she was 15. Her grandfather had taken her to the local bullring. He tested her ambition by taking her to see a calf but she showed no fear, only interest.

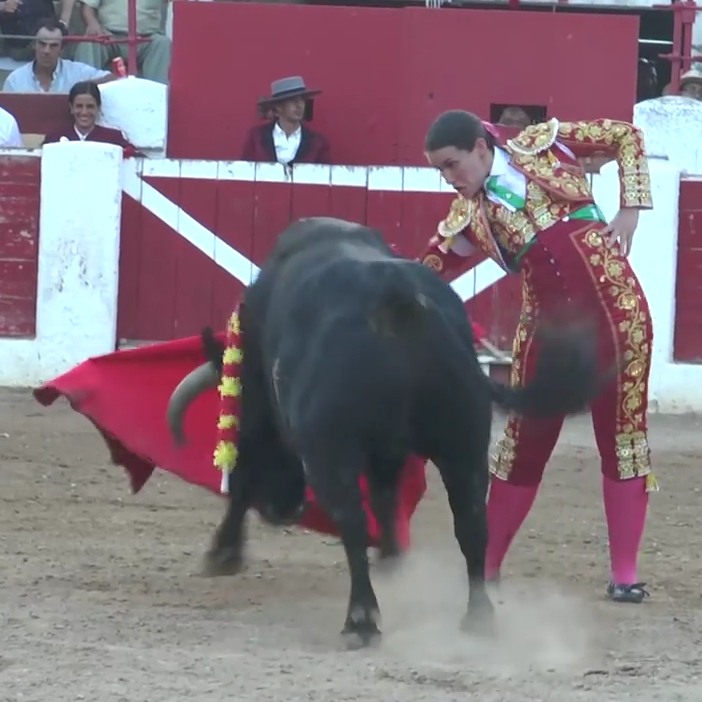
Conchi Ríos in 2016 in Cehegín in Murcia.

She made her debut in public at a bullfight on 23 September 2007. She first appeared as a picador in 2009 supporting Luis Miguel Casares ("El Nico"). She first appeared at Las Ventas in Madrid in 2011 on a bill that included Simon Lopez, Jimenez Fortes and José Cruz. In 2011 she was the first woman to take two ears off a bull but this was not a victory as for three years she did not have another bullfight. She spent time in education but she feared that despite her ambition she might work in a supermarket. She ended up bullfighting in Peru where there are less restrictions on the sport.

In 2015, she was one of the only six female bullfighters in a national list of 825.

In 2016, she appeared with the veteran bullfighter El Cordobés and Antonio Puerta in Cehegín in Murcia.

In 2016, she and her boyfriend, Jose Manuel Mas, moved to a house near Torrijos. They both train every day which includes two hours of bullfighting using a one wheeled device that becomes the bull. In 2016, she was chosen as one of BBC's 100 Women. She was the only Spaniard of the twenty European women chosen. The BBC highlighted that was now only one of four women in 820 bullfighters and they noted her saying "I believe in the equality of women and men. Everyone has to fight for whatever it is that they want to do in life."
