= Nicolasa Escamilla =

Spanish bullfighter of the eighteenth century

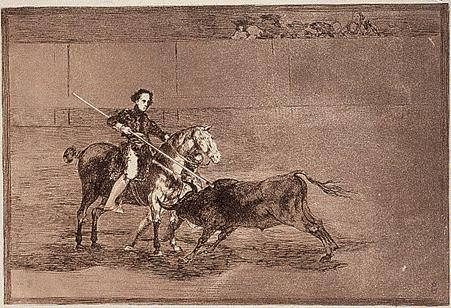
Nicolasa Escamilla

Nicolasa Escamilla known as La Pajuelera (fl. 1747 – fl. 1776) was a Spanish bullfighter.

She was one of the most famous bullfighters of her sex. She was the subject of an illustration by Francisco Goya and a poem by Fernando Soteras.
