= Claude Melki =

French actor (1939–1994)

Claude Melki (1939–1994) was a French actor.

== Selected filmography ==
- Line of Sight (1960)
- Six in Paris (1965)
- L'Acrobate (1976)
