= Marie Sara =

French bullfighter

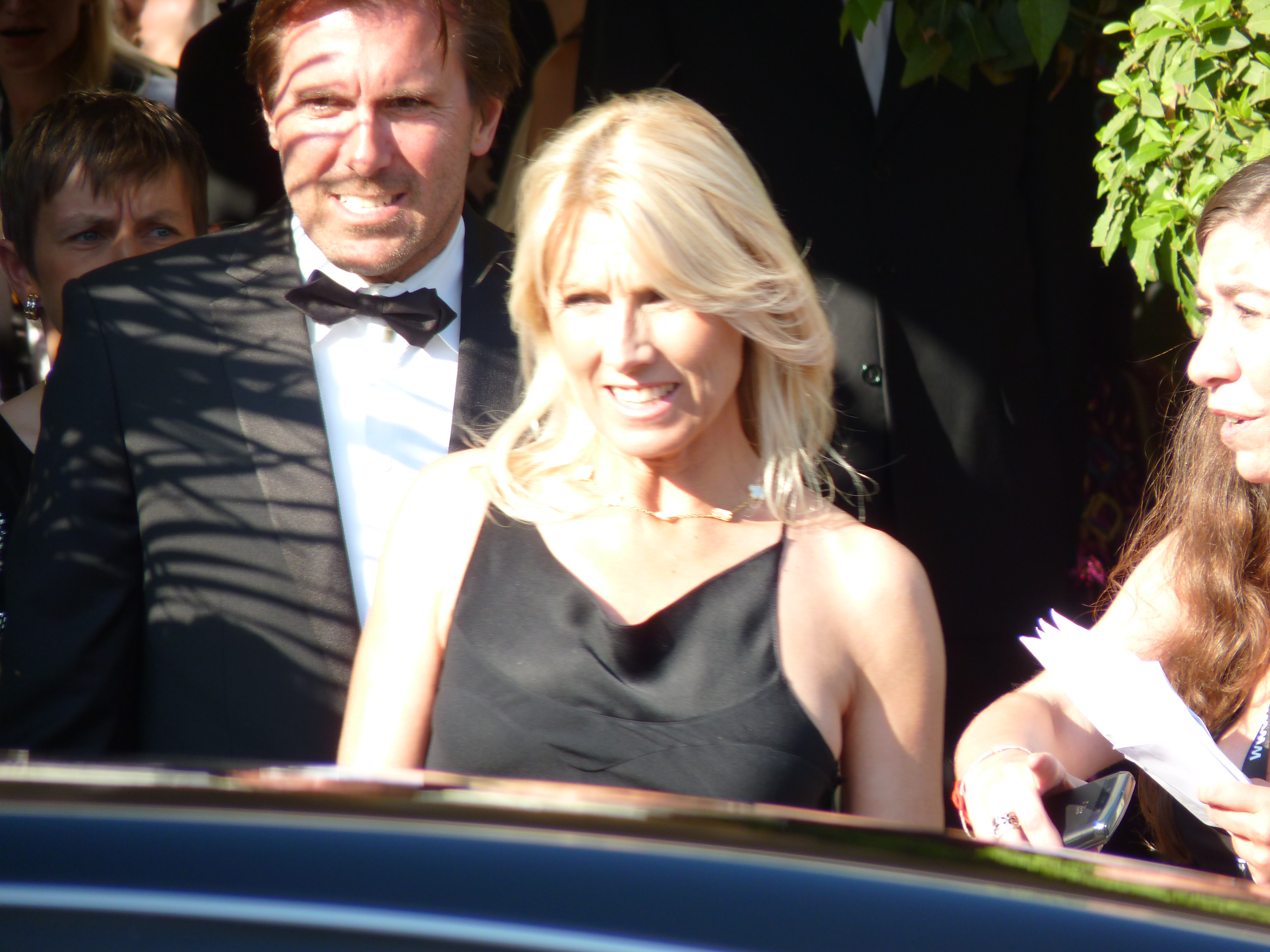
- Born: Marie Bourseiller; June 27, 1964; Boulogne-Billancourt, Île-de-France, France
- Occupation: Bullfighter
- Spouses: Henri Leconte (m. 1995; div. 1998) Christophe Lambert (m. 2004; died 2016)
- Children: 3
- Parent(s): Antoine Bourseiller; Chantal Darget
- Relatives: Rosalie Varda (half-sister); Christophe Bourseiller (half-brother)

Marie Sara (born Marie Bourseiller; June 27, 1964) is a French bullfighter. In 1991 she was Europe's only female rejoneador (rejoneadora). Jean-Luc Godard was her godfather.

She was born to director Antoine Bourseiller and actress Chantal Darget (born Marie Chantal Chauvet). Rosalie Varda is her paternal half-sister. Christophe Bourseiller (né Gintzburger) is her maternal half-brother.

She was a candidate for En Marche! in the 2017 Legislative Elections in France.

== See also ==
- List of female bullfighters
