= Agnes von Rosen =

Swedish bullfighter and stunt performer (1924–2001)

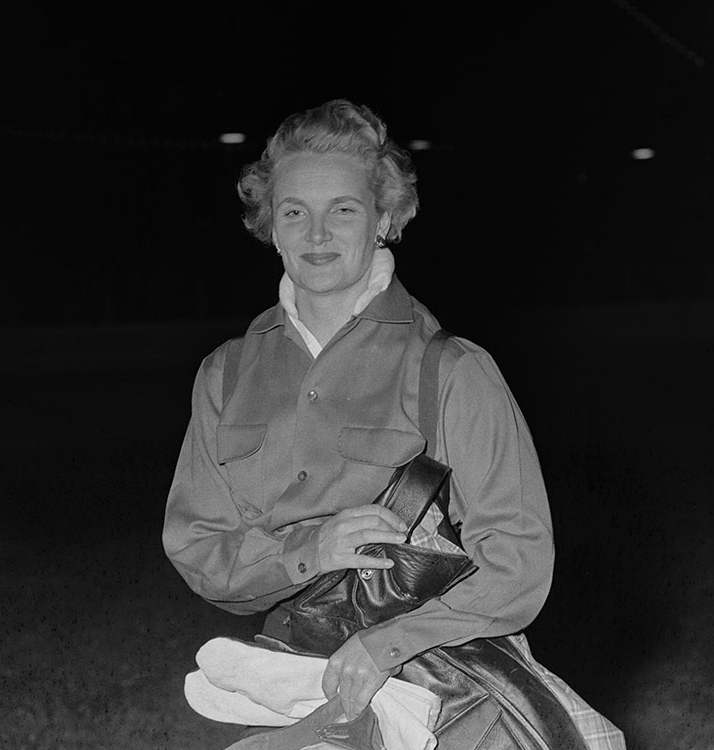
- Agnes von Rosen, Sydney 1955
- Born: Agnes Elsa Clara Lilian Maud; September 8, 1924; Stockholm, Sweden
- Died: April 11, 2001 (aged 76); Mexico
- Occupations: Stunt performer; bullfighter; actor
- Known for: Bullfighting, car stunts
- Spouse(s): Lars Wahlquist, David Jassan Elguero
- Children: Christina Sabine Maud von Rosen, Johan Wahlquist, Dagmar and Charlotte Margarita Victoria Jassan Von Rosen

Agnes von Rosen (September 8, 1924 – April 4, 2001) was a Swedish aristocrat, bullfighter, and stunt performer. She spent most of her later years in Mexico.

== Life ==
Agnes von Rosen, the daughter of Count Gustaf-Fredrik von Rosen, military attaché in Washington D.C. (1931–32), London (1939-42) and Copenhagen (1945–49), was born on 8 September 1924. Graduating in physiotherapy at Lund University, Sweden, she acted in French and Italian films and had toured in shows throughout America as a bullfighter.

According to The Australian Women's Weekly, she became interested in bullfighting after seeing a newsreel of a woman fighting bulls on horseback when she was 12. After marrying Lars Wahlquist, she moved to Mexico to pursue her dreams of becoming a bullfighter. She divorced Lars in 1949. By this time, she was the mother of Christina Sabine Maud von Rosen and Johan Wahlquist.

In September 1955, the 'Hell Drivers' opened their ‘Hollywood Tournament of Thrills’ at the Sydney Showground. This 'tournament' brought together some of the world's greatest stunt drivers for a night of thrills and spills during which they performed over 22 different stunts. One of these stunts was done by Agnes von Rosen, who was pulled behind one of the cars as it hurtled through a wall of flames.

She was a multifaceted individual who was also recognized for her appearances in popular 1960s "fotonovelas".

On January 27, 1959, she married David Jassan Elguero, an architect and structure professor at UNAM in Mexico. They had two daughters, Dagmar and Charlotte Margarita Victoria Von Rosen.

Agnes von Rosen died in Mexico on April 11, 2001, at the age of 76.
