= Jacques Monnet =

French film director, screenwriter and actor (born 1934)

- Born: Jacques Robert Alfred Yves Monnet; 18 January 1934 (age 92); Concarneau, France
- Occupations: film director, screenwriter, actor
- Spouse: France

Jacques Robert Alfred Yves Monnet (born 18 January 1934) is a French film director, screenwriter and actor.

== Early life and career ==
Jacques Monnet was born in Concarneau on 18 January 1934. He was a factory worker and electrical fitter at EDF. In the 1970s Monnet joined a studio and directed commercials. He also appeared in the films and on television as an actor. Clara et les Chics Types became his first feature film, which he directed.

== Filmography ==
Year	Title	Actor	Director	Writer
1975	Special Section	Yes	No	No
1976	Black and White in Color	Yes	No	No
1977	The New Avengers (Episode: K Is for Kill Part Two: Tiger by the Tail)	Yes	No	No
1979	C'est pas moi, c'est lui	Yes	No	No
1981	Clara et les Chics Types	No	Yes	No
1982	Elle voit des nains partout !	Yes	No	No
1983	Signes extérieurs de richesse	No	Yes	Yes
1987	Promis…juré !	No	Yes	Yes
1991	Bonjour la galère	No	No	Yes
1993	Wild Target	Yes	No	No
1995	Adrien Lesage (Episode: Ma fille est impossible)	No	Yes	No
1997	La Femme du cosmonaute	No	Yes	Yes
1999	C'est pas ma faute !	No	Yes	Yes
2007	Conversations with My Gardener	No	No	Yes
2011	Itinéraire bis	No	No	Yes
