= A Room in Town =

Une chambre en ville
- Theatrical release poster
- Directed by: Jacques Demy
- Written by: Jacques Demy
- Produced by: Christine Gouze-Rénal
- Starring: Dominique Sanda; Danielle Darrieux; Richard Berry; Michel Piccoli
- Cinematography: Jean Penzer
- Edited by: Sabine Mamou
- Music by: Michel Colombier
- Production companies: Progefi; TF1; Union Generale Cinematographique
- Distributed by: UGC Distribution
- Release date: 27 October 1982
- Running time: 90 minutes
- Country: France
- Language: French

Une chambre en ville (also known as A Room in Town) is a 1982 French musical drama film written and directed by Jacques Demy, with music by Michel Colombier, and starring Dominique Sanda, Danielle Darrieux and Michel Piccoli. It is set against the backdrop of a workers' strike in 1955 Nantes. Like Demy's most famous film, The Umbrellas of Cherbourg, it is an operetta-musical in which every line of dialogue is sung. However, unlike Cherbourg, Chambre is closer to tragedy, with a darker, more explicitly political tone.

The film won the Prix Méliès, and was nominated for nine César Awards: Best Film, Best Director, Most Promising Actress, Best Supporting Actor, Best Supporting Actress, Best Cinematography, Best Music, Best Production Design and Best Sound.

== Plot ==
The story is set during a workers' strike in Nantes in 1955. Young shipyard worker François Guilbaud is one of the strikers, and he rents a room from Madame Langlois, a widow who sympathizes with the strikers although she is herself upper-class, born a baroness. His girlfriend Violette Pelletier, who works in a shop and lives with her mother, wants to get married but he is unwilling, partly because they have no money and nowhere to live.

In the street François is accosted by a beautiful woman wearing only a fur coat. This is Édith Leroyer, unhappily married to the owner of a television shop, who has taken to part-time prostitution. The two have a blissful night together in a cheap hotel and fall in love.

In the morning Violette comes looking for François because she has learned she is pregnant, but he tells her he loves another woman. Meanwhile, Édith, going back to her husband's shop to collect some things and leave him, has a terrible row with him during which he cuts his throat. She flees back to her mother, who is François' landlady. Next morning, François joins a demonstration which is broken up by the police and is fatally injured. His workmates carry him up to the flat of the baroness, where he dies in the arms of Édith. Unable to live without him, she shoots herself.

== Cast ==
- Dominique Sanda - Edith Leroyer
- Danielle Darrieux - Margot Langlois
- Richard Berry - François Guilbaud
- Michel Piccoli - Edmond Leroyer
- Fabienne Guyon - Violette Pelletier
- Anna Gaylor - Madame Pelletier
- Jean-François Stévenin - Dambiel
- Jean-Louis Rolland - Ménager
- Marie-France Roussel - Mme Sforza
- Georges Blaness - Chef des CRS
- Yann Dedet - Ouvrier
- Nicolas Hossein - Ouvrier
- Gil Warga - Ouvrier
- Antoine Mikola - Ouvrier
- Marie-Pierre Feuillard - Femme à l'enfant
