= Christophe Bourseiller =

French actor and writer (born 1957)

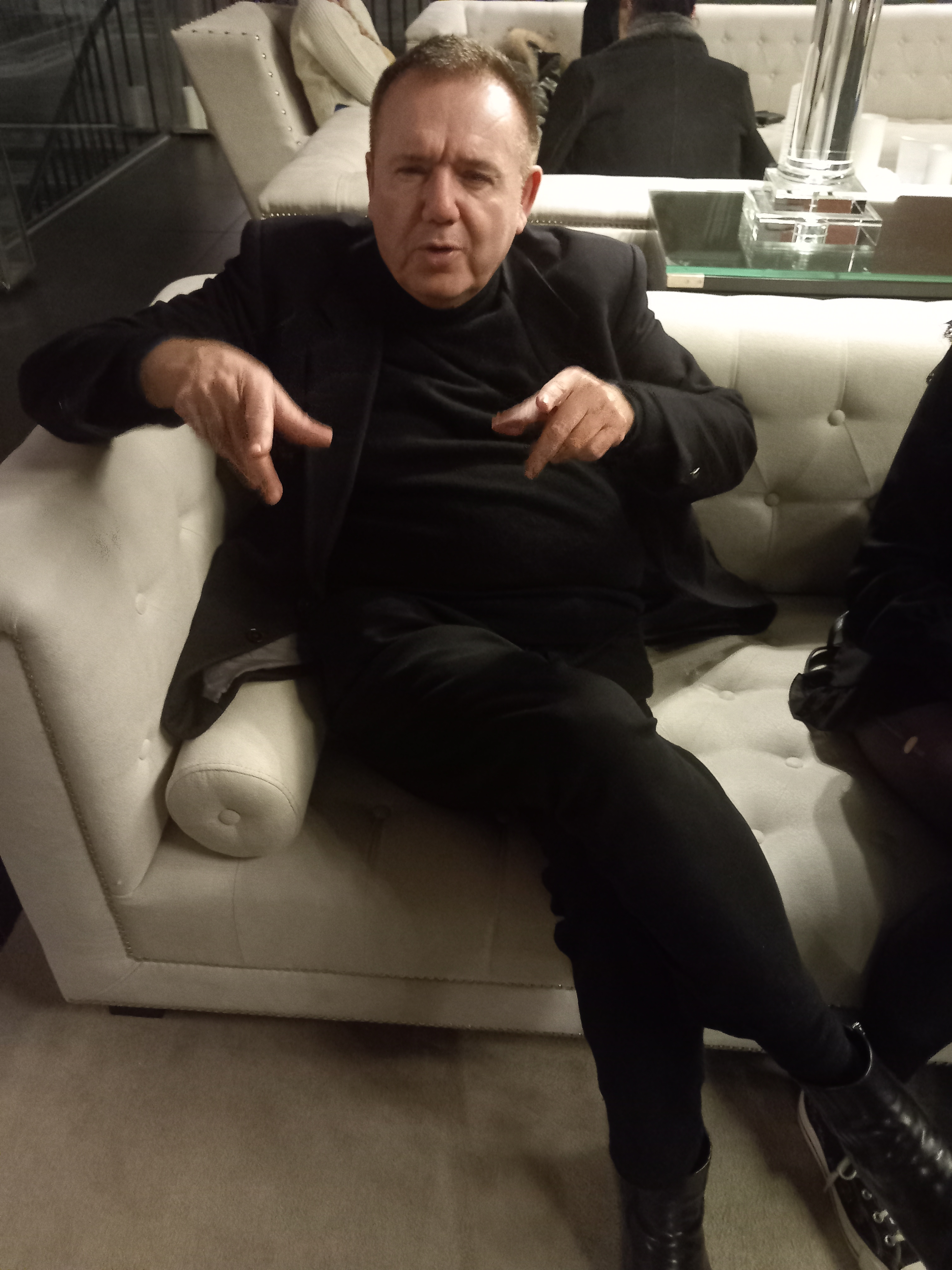
- Bourseiller in December 2023
- Born: Christophe Gintzburger; 27 September 1957 (age 68); Paris, France

Christophe Gintzburger (born 27 September 1957), known professionally as Christophe Bourseiller (French pronunciation: [buʁsɛje]), is a French actor, writer, freemason and journalist. He began his career as a child actor and made his debut in Yves Robert's 1962 film War of the Buttons. He made several appearances on stage in the late 1970s and early 1980s and again in 2005 and 2006.

== Biography ==
He was born Christophe Gintzburger. His father, André Gintzburger called Kinsbourg (1923–2013), was a playwright and theater producer. His mother, Chantal Darget (née Marie Chantal Chauvet; 1934–1988), was an actress and the daughter of journalist Claude Darget. His mother subsequently married the director Antoine Bourseiller (of which Christophe adopts the surname as a stage name) and they had a daughter, the rejoneadora Marie Sara.

From the age of four, he appears in cinemas in War of the Buttons, the film by Yves Robert. He then played under the direction of Jean-Luc Godard, Claude Lelouch, Jacques Demy and Pierre Jolivet. It is found in the credits of about thirty films, about twenty telefilms and on the poster of several plays.

At the same time, he pursues a career as a writer, journalist, radio and television man. He has published thirty books on topics as diverse as: minority movements, political extremism, the counterculture, the industrial music and the new wave of the 1980s.

Nearly a time of milieux of extreme left, it dedicates, in 1996, a work to the French Maoists entitled The Maoists: The Folle History of the French Red Guards.

On the radio, he began by creating in 1981 the free radio Frequency arts and shows. On France Musique, he co-produced a weekly program, launched in 2005 and dedicated to avant-garde music: Electromania and animated the morning for two seasons from 2011 to 2013. On television, after having presented several programs since 1984, he becomes editorial advisor of the program Ce soir (ou jamais!) until July 2011. He also participates in a historic program L'Ombre d'un Doubt on FR3 on Wednesdays on two, hosted by the presenter Franck Ferrand.

In 2001, he published a review of studies on the Situationist International, Éditions Denoël, Archives and Situationist Documents, five issues of which will appear until 2005. In 2009, he was behind the "Who Are You? " by Bourin Éditeur.

Since 2003, he has taught at the Institut d'Etudes Politiques in Paris and at Sciences Po Lille. He is also preparing a PhD thesis at the Paris-1 Panthéon-Sorbonne University on Les Mouvements collaborationnistes français from June 1944 to December 1950 under the direction of Pascal Ory.

Since childhood, Christophe Bourseiller has been collecting leaflets and propaganda documents. He entrusted thousands to the Institute of Social History in Amsterdam. He also collects, among others, rare and newspapers [ref. Required].

In 2014, he participated in the second season of the program Les Pieds dans le plat on Europe 1 as a columnist. Since September 7, 2014, he also produces on Musique Musique the program Musicus Politicus, which deals with the links between music and politics. He is finally chronicler in La Bande originale, on France Inter.

== Bibliography ==
- 1984 : Une scène jeunesse, Éditions Autrement
- 1989 : Les Ennemis du système, Éditions Robert Laffont
- 1991 : Extrême Droite, l'enquête, Éditions François Bourin (Éditions du Rocher, 2002, La Nouvelle Extrême Droite)
- 1993 : Les Faux Messies, Éditions Fayard
- 1995 : Message Reçu, Éditions Spengler
- 1995 : Mauvais Garçons (en collaboration), Éditions Spengler
- 1996 : Les Maoïstes, la folle histoire des gardes rouges français, Éditions Plon
- 1997 : Cet Étrange Monsieur Blondel, Éditions Bartillat
- 1998 : Les Écrivains et l'engagement (en collaboration), Bibliothèque publique d'information
- 1999 : Le Guide de l'Autre Paris, Éditions Bartillat
- 1999 : Vie et Mort de Guy Debord, Éditions Plon (Pocket, 2002)
- 2000 : Le Miracle inutile, Éditions Flammarion
- 2000 : Dictionnaire du rock (en collaboration), Éditions Robert Laffont
- 2000 : Les Forcenés du désir, Éditions Denoël
- 2001 : Le Guide de l'Autre Londres, Éditions Bartillat
- 2002 : Ein Gespenst geht um in Europa (en collaboration), Böhlau Verlag
- 2003 : La Véritable Histoire de Lutte ouvrière (entretiens avec Robert Barcia), Éditions Denoël
- 2003 : Jacqueline de Jong, Undercover in de Kunst/in art (en collaboration), Ludion
- 2003 : Fous littéraires, nouveaux chantiers(en collaboration), Du Lérot
- 2003 : Histoire générale de l'ultra-gauche, Éditions Denoël
- 2004 : Bibliothèque secrète, Éditions Bartillat
- 2004 : Les Têtes de Turc (en collaboration), Du Lérot
- 2005 : Carlos Castaneda, la vérité du mensonge, Éditions du Rocher
- 2006 : L'Aventure moderne, Flammarion
- 2006 : Extrêmes gauches, la tentation de la réforme, Éditions Textuel
- 2008 : Génération Chaos - Punk, New Wave 1975 - 1981, Éditions Denoël
- 2009 : À gauche, toute !, CNRS Éditions
- 2009 : Lutte armée, Éditions du toucan
- 2009 : Qui etes vous ? Antoinette Fouque (en collaboration avec Antoinette Fouque), Bourin Editeur
- 2010 : Qui etes vous ? Michel Maffesoli (en collaboration avec Michel Maffesoli), Bourin Editeur
- 2010 : Un Maçon franc, Éditions Alphée

== Filmography ==
- 1964: Une femme mariée
- 1976: Pardon Mon Affaire
- 1979: Courage - Let's Run
- 1981: Clara et les Chics Types
- 1991: A Mere Mortal (Simple mortel)
- 2015: The Art Dealer
