= Savika =

Betsileo (Madagascar) ox-wrestling ritual sport

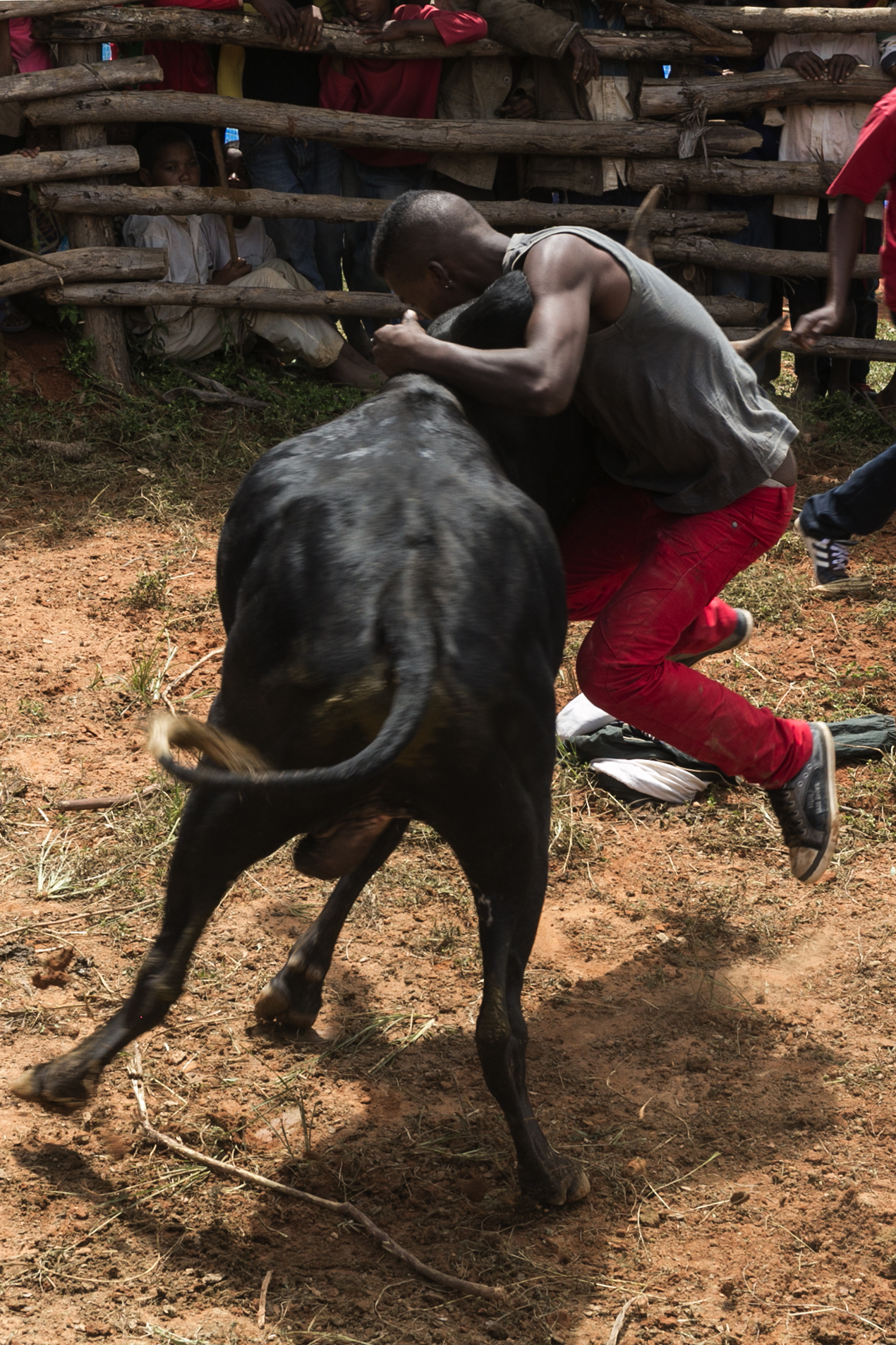
The object of savika is to bring the zebu to the ground by its horns or hump.

Savika, (Note: SAH-vee-kah) also savik'omby or savika omby (lit. 'to cling to the back of a zebu'), is a traditional zebu-wrestling sport of Madagascar's Betsileo people, in which fighters, called mpisavika, attempt to bring a zebu ox to the ground by its horns or hump. Though the practice can be found throughout Madagascar's Central Highlands, it is most common in the Ambositra region, outside of which it is called tolon'omby (lit. 'to fight against the zebu'). (Note: A third term for Malagasy zebu-fighting, kidramadrama, refers to a distinct tradition among the Sakalava people of Northwestern Madagascar, separate in origin and practice from savika.) The tradition, which accompanies many festivities and rituals for the Betsileo, is particularly important as a courtship practice for young men to impress potential brides and their families. Preparation for savika begins in childhood, with boys playing make-believe zebu games known as kiombiomby (Note: Also kiaomby.) before training with real bulls.

Originating as an ancient game between rice farmers and their cattle, savika has evolved into a complex ritual involving magical healers, traditional guardians, and legendary wrestlers. There is no written guidance for the rituals of savika; it is entirely an oral tradition passed to young men from fathers, village mystics, and older fighters. Various legends offering mythic explanations for savika exist among the Betsileo, whose agrarian society centers around the zebu ox. Savika has endured through significant cultural shifts, including Madagascar's Christianization, colonization, and decolonization, into the modern day. In recent decades, a standardized, professional form of savika has developed as a popular spectator sport around the nation's capital.

== Tradition ==
=== Savika an-tanimbary ===
Savika an-tanimbary ('savika in the rice paddies') is the original, ludic form of savika, wherein farmers bring zebu to the wet rice paddies during the planting season (October to December) to trample the earth and wrestle them in the mud. It is done to entertain the farmers and maintain the health of the cattle. Farmers may also excite the oxen by mounting them, facilitating deeper penetration of the soil as the agitated zebu stomps, jumps, and runs.

=== Ritual and spectacle savika ===
==== Occasions ====
Besides savika an-tanimbary, savika matches coincide with festivals and rituals in the Betsileo calendar. Organizing a savika spectacle displays wealth, and it is traditionally the responsibility of high elders and great fighters. Local entrepreneurs and candidates for public office may also host savika.

During the period of circumcision rites (held in the colder months of May or June, so that the boys' wounds heal more quickly), families organize savika to promote strength and persistence in children. Christian Betsileo associate the savika season with Easter and Pentecost. Fights also take place surrounding famadihana, the annual ceremony of exhuming ancestral corpses. Some tribes organize funerary savika as part of the festivities that follow procession and burial: the ritual is intended to distract one of the deceased's two immortal souls. Among the Betsileo, the wrestled bull is eventually slaughtered, and its meat is used to feed the guests or be presented to guests in return for their gifts. Dennis Regnier recounts a savika at an ancestor-honoring festival. After the zebu was ritually slaughtered, a man entered the pen and repeatedly struck the zebu's corpse, announcing name changes in the village to onlookers and ancestors. The name-changing ritual took place at the savika because of the crowd's size and attentiveness, and the animal's corpse was struck to retain the attention of the ancestors. Some villages, most notably the commune of Manandriana-Avaradrano, stage savika to celebrate Madagascar's Independence Day on June 26.

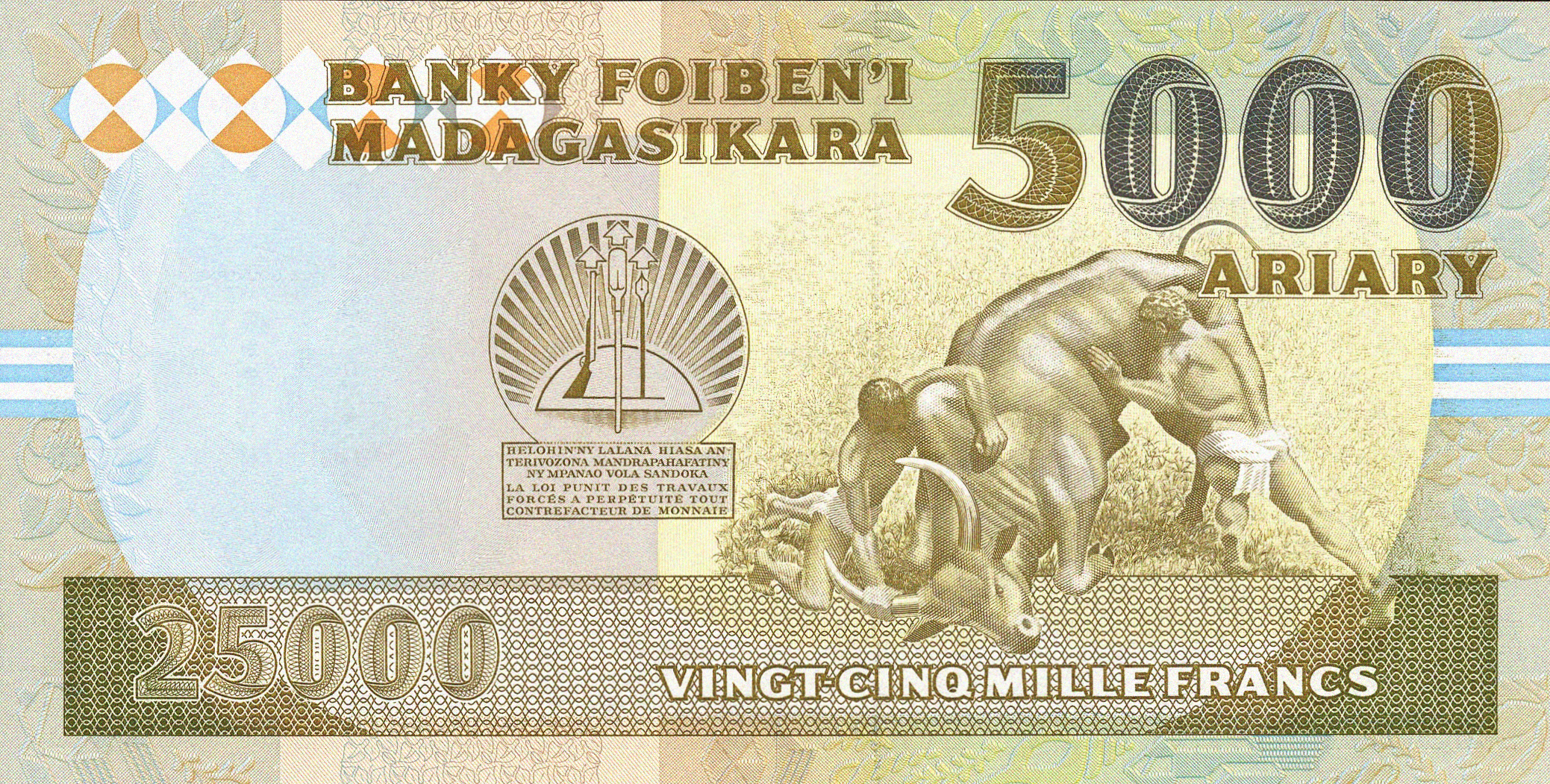
A 5000 Malagasy ariary banknote, issued between 1992 and 1998, depicting savika.

==== Zebu selection ====
Fighting zebu raised for savika are fed supplementary diets of cassava and yam twice a day. Zebu are chosen based on appearance, pedigree, and apparent fierceness and strength. Good savika zebu generally have large humps, developed horns, and lean, muscular bodies, are between 3 and 4 years old, and weigh between 300 and 400 kg. The most desirable zebu are either reddish-black with grey ears, or sport a tricolor (red, black, and white) coat. Buyers test the aggression of zebus at market by poking them with sticks, and aggressive zebu fetch much higher prices than docile cattle, especially when fighters are present at market. Zebu aggression is described according to a system of classification (e.g. magnapika zebu, who "gore from bottom to top"). Once a zebu is purchased, an ombiasa (healer) performs rituals to render the ox invincible, and feeds it a strengthening potion whose formula is kept secret to prevent the production of an antidote. Docile zebu who are otherwise good candidates for savika may be given stimulants before entering the arena.

==== Rites and preparation ====
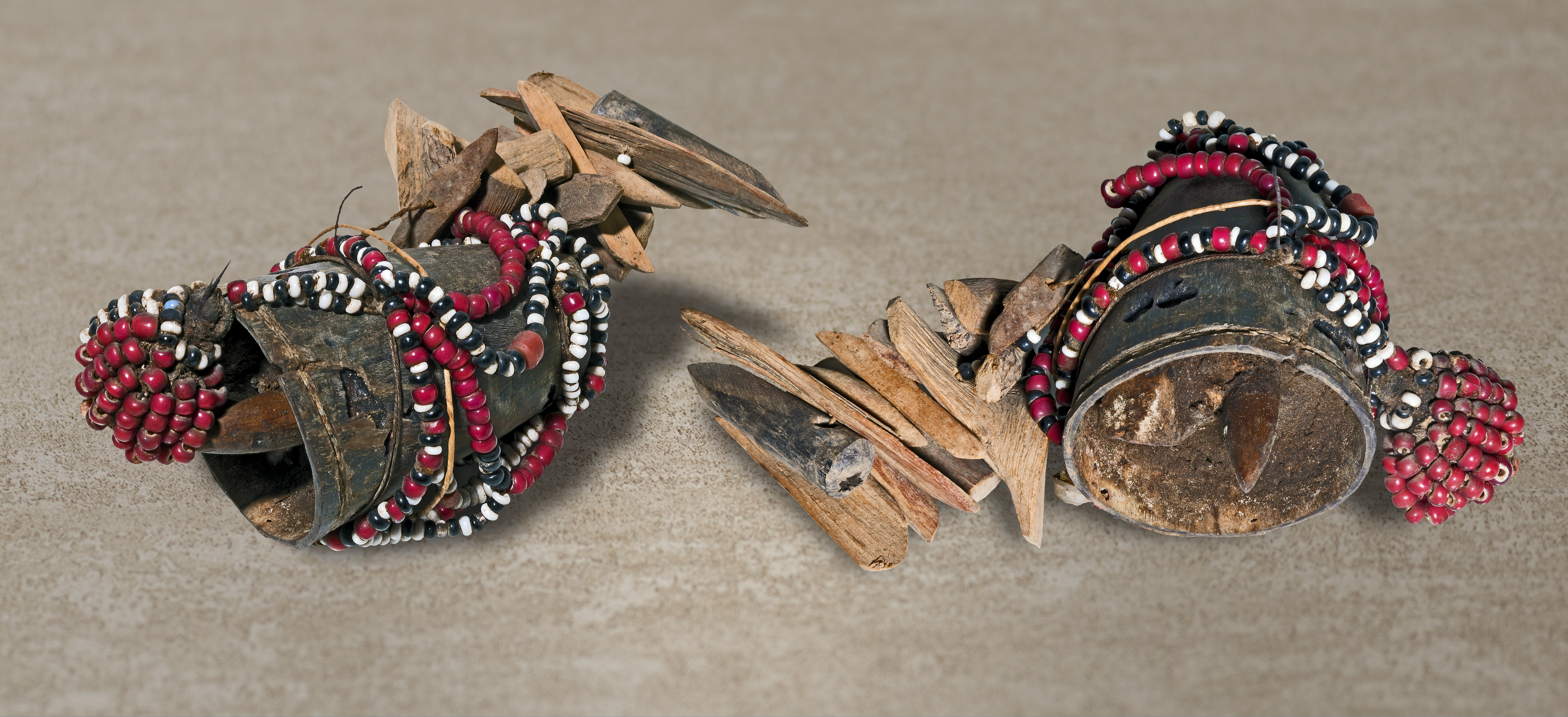
Protective ody are used to ritually purify savika fighters.

Savika is considered sacred, and the fight itself is preceded by a number of rites, including offerings of rum, requests for blessing, and a period of sexual abstinence. Mpisavika (fighters) form teams of about ten according to village affiliation and skill level, overseen by raimandreny (protectors) and ombiasa. Sons-in-law form their own class, called vinato. Teams meet on the day before the fight to eat together out of one bowl and purify themselves with magical talismans or potions called ody. To prepare for the fight, mpisavika follow certain fady (taboos) symbolizing avoidance of junction or penetration: no sitting at crossroads, no drinking at the intersections of streams, no eating foods that have been mixed together. One taboo requires that no women enter the arena, with the consequence of its violation being serious injury or death. For this reason, there are no female mpisavika. Mpisavika who arrive for a fight in a place unknown to them must consult the local ombiasy to learn the local fady. Violation of these fady is believed to result in injury to the fighter. An mpisavika who has violated the necessary fady must make a costly sacrifice, which can range from a rooster to a healthy zebu, depending on the severity of his infraction. If the violator suffers a serious injury in the fight, the ombiasy is tasked with healing him, often using his own saliva mixed with the medicinal plants fanamoka, ahibalala, and tsimanandra.

On the day of the fight, the fighters traditionally swallow a strength potion and wear special clothing. Fighters of the forest-dwelling Tanala tribe drink an infusion of saro and soafotsy as a pre-savika tonic. Betsileo mpisavika often drink alcohol before fighting, including at funerals.

==== Fight ====
The coordinator introduces the event, delivering a kabary (oration) explaining the tradition and blessing the zebus and fighters. Savika ceremonies are ubiquitously preceded by a "prayer of invocation of Zanahary [the supreme deity of Malagasy religion], the ancestors, and the holy land." The fighters' representatives recite a vow of fair conduct. The zebus' owners recite their own kabary introducing the animals. Barefoot and armed with sticks, fighters take turns wrestling the ox. During the event, women sing a theme song containing directives for the fighters, accompanied by piercing screams. Women also throw cold water into the arena throughout the fight, which enrages the animal and refreshes the man. The fighter attempts to defeat the animal by either encircling its hump, choking its neck, or grasping its head. Victory over the zebu is proclaimed when the animal lies on the ground, or if the final blow is "unequivocal". The zebu is sometimes sacrificed, sometimes returned to its owner, and sometimes gifted to the champion. Fighters may receive monetary rewards from spectators for being the first to fight the ox, but such rewards are generally uncommon, as savika is considered a social institution whose innate rewards are spiritual and communal.

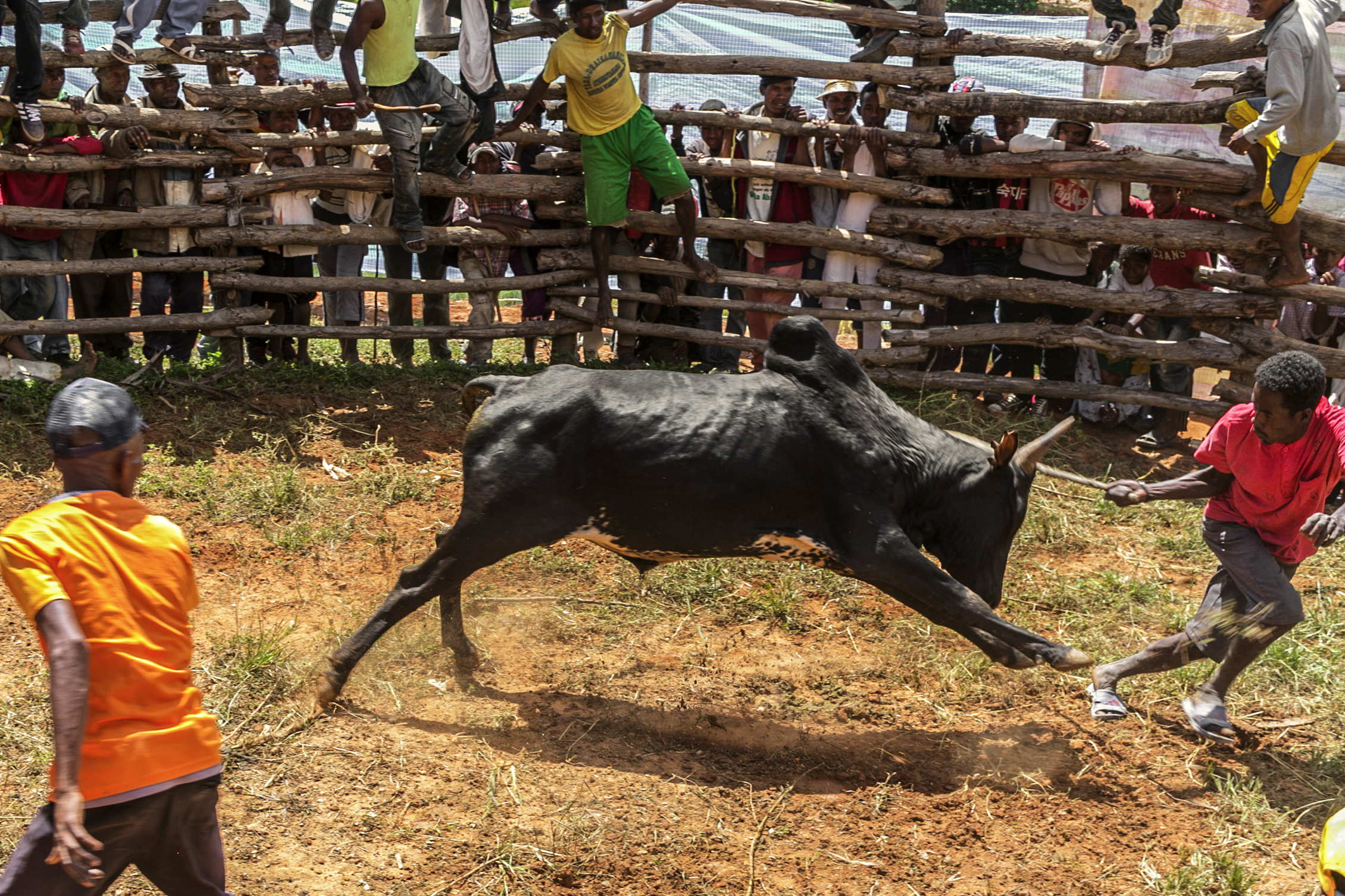
Two Betsileo men engaging in savika, watched by their village

=== Other bull-fighting traditions in Madagascar ===
Among the neighboring Bara people, stampeding cattle are wrestled and mounted in a sport called mitolo aomby associated with funerary procession.

Sakalava bull-fighters prepare and drink an overnight-infused decoction of jingoma (Flacourtia ramontchi), sambalahy (Albizzia fastigiata), satramira (Hyphaena coriacea) and sakaitany (Hedychium flavescens) during the fight's preparatory period, during which they abstain from sex and do not eat herbs or vegetables. The potion is purported to make the fighter impervious to goring, and the solids remaining after infusion may be powdered and applied to the fighter's skin and clothing for additional power.

James Sibree describes a bullfight as part of Sihanaka festivities surrounding the rites of circumcision: they choose the strongest ox, sharpen its horns, and tackle the animal in groups "after two or three days' continuous drinking, when they [have gotten] perfectly maddened with spirits and ready for any foolhardy adventure".

==== Kidramadrama ====
Kidramadrama (derived from Ramadan) is a bull-fighting practice among the Sakalava people on the island of Nosy Be unrelated to savika, having its roots in the Comoros. In 1922, French ethnologist André Dandouau asserted that kidramadrama in Nosy Be (located off Madagascar's Northwestern coast, far from Betsileo country) originates from the nearby Comorian island of Anjouan. Alain Gyre reports that the practice in Nosy Be was inherited in 1949 from a small number of Comorian immigrants and Spaniards who arrived on the island aboard a ship called the Kotriha. Kidramadrama is practically distinct from savika in its use of a lambahoany cloth to agitate the zebu, similar to the muleta used in Spanish bull-fighting. The game ends when the zebu is tired or ignoring provocation. It is associated with festivities, particularly with Eid among Nosy Be's sizable Muslim community.

== Social function and significance ==
Savika is considered an educative rite of passage for young Betsileo, teaching them resilience and dominance, and initiating them into a patrimonial oral tradition maintained by a hierarchy of fathers, great fighters, protectors and healers. Performance in savika is considered particularly important for prospective sons-in-law to prove themselves to their future wives' families. Skill at savika is emblematic of masculinity and virility, and victory brings glory to the fighter, his village, and his ancestors. Ernest Ratsimbazafy identified savika as important to local social politics, including in elements relating to the procurement of zebu, the organizing of events, and the creation of a restricted caste of mpisavika who share with each other knowledge that is forbidden to those who do not fight.

Iboniamasiboniamanoro, the hero of the centuries-old Malagasy epic Ibonia, is recognized in the legend for his skill at bull-fighting.

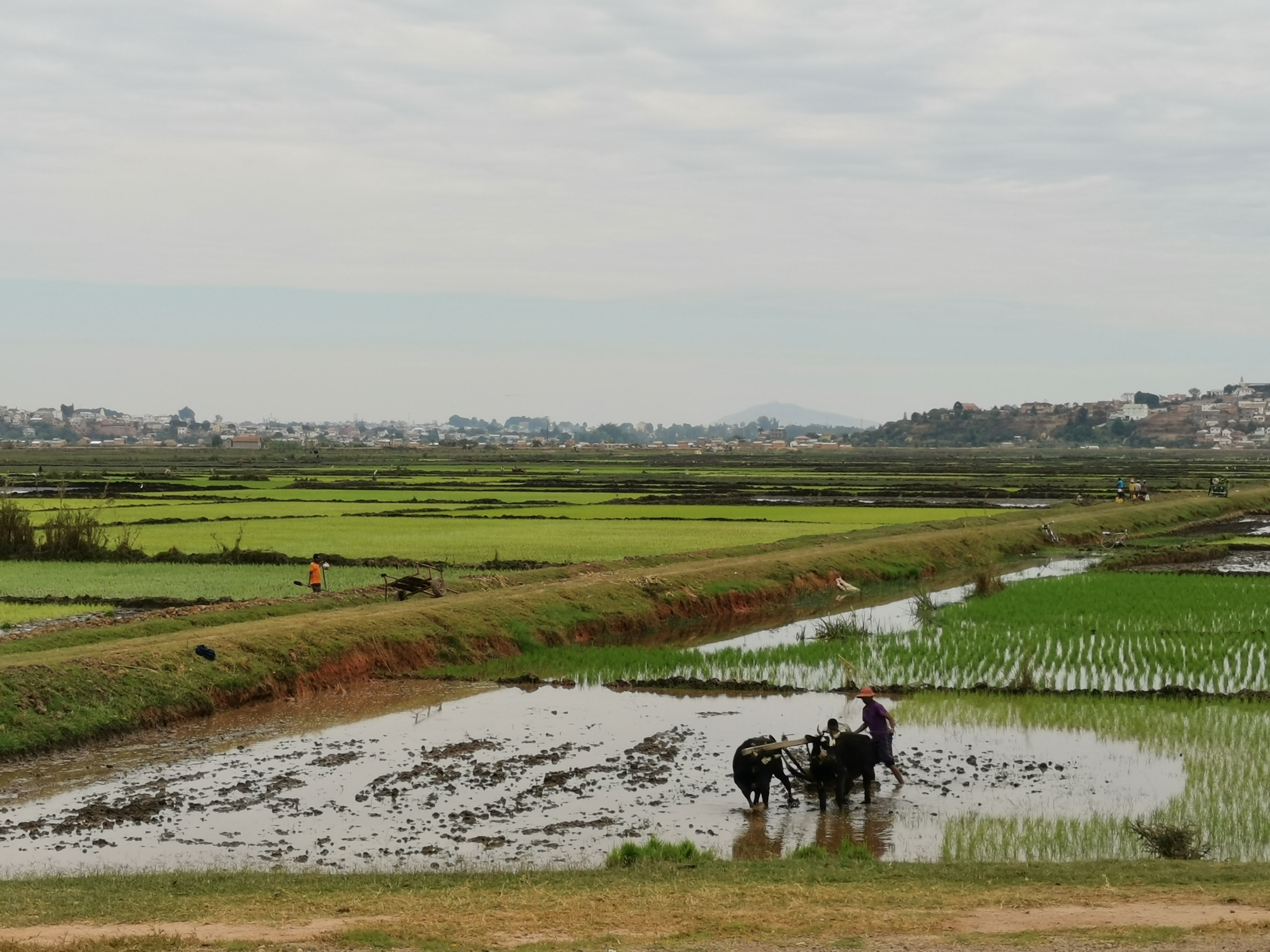
Zebu are of particular importance in Madagascar for the production of rice: the zebu tread on the wet soil to soften the earth for rice plants.

=== Zebu ===
Present on the island since the 9th century CE, zebus are a symbol of prosperity and power across all of Madagascar, and are so valued that they are commonly subject to thievery from bandits (called dahalo). In Madagascar, zebu outnumber people, and 6,813 Malagasy proverbs, common sayings, and expressions on the island refer to the animal.

Zebu are particularly central to Betsileo life, being essential to agriculture among the agrarian people; one's social status and wealth can be measured by his herd of zebu. A man's ox is considered his greatest companion after his wife. Savika is an important ritual element of Betsileo zebu culture.

==== Kiombiomby ====
External images
- Photos of Betsileo clay zebu figurines
- Child showing a Zebu made of clay, Madagascar
- Child showing a Zebu made of clay, Madagascar

Betsileo children and adolescents play mimetic zebu games called kiombiomby, familiarizing themselves with zebus in preparation for savika.

At infancy, children rub shoulders with zebu in their fathers' arms or tied to their mothers' backs, as their parents walk beside their cattle. Crying babies are brought by their fathers to admire the family's zebu.

Betsileo children craft and play with clay figurines representing zebu, with emphasized horns and humps. Using their figurines, they model typical zebu interactions: herdsmen guiding cattle, zebus carrying objects, and savika wrestling. Such play is called kiaombitaniditra or kiaomby. (Note: kiaomby is the word used by the Bara people for playing with zebu figurines, while Betsileo people use kiaomby as a synonym for kiombiomby.) Between 3 and 5 years of age, boys sharpen cassava stems and use them to "fight" imaginary miniature zebu in a game called kiaombilahimbilona. Boys of this age also play kiaombivalala, a sort of cricket-fighting in which boys compete to catch the strongest and largest crickets, who then fight in a pit. A boy's wealth is measured in the strength and number of his crickets, modeling zebu ownership. Beetle-fighting in imitation of bull-fighting has also been recorded among Malagasy children.

School-aged boys (6–12) begin play-wrestling in imitation of zebu and savika fighters. These savika-imitative games are collectively called kiaombiona. One type of kiaombiona, called kiaombimandady, (Note: Mandady means 'to walk on all fours'.) has one participant on all fours, bucking his head and twitching his shoulders to simulate a zebu. The other player remains on his feet and must attempt to mount the "zebu" boy, playing the role of the mpisavika. As soon as the "zebu" is immobilized, the "mpisavika" wins, and the roles switch. Kiaombimitsangana is a different style of kiaombiona, in which both players begin the game on their feet. The "zebu" boy interlaces his fingers, leaving his two index fingers out as his symbolic "horns". The other boy, playing the role of the mpisavika, must attempt to subdue his opponent by catching him by the "horns" (that is, his hands), back, or neck. The "zebu" rushes in all directions, running, jumping, pawing and kicking. The players exchange roles very frequently.

In adolescence, boys are trained with young bulls, then with adult oxen during the hosy (rice-planting).

== History ==
=== Origins ===
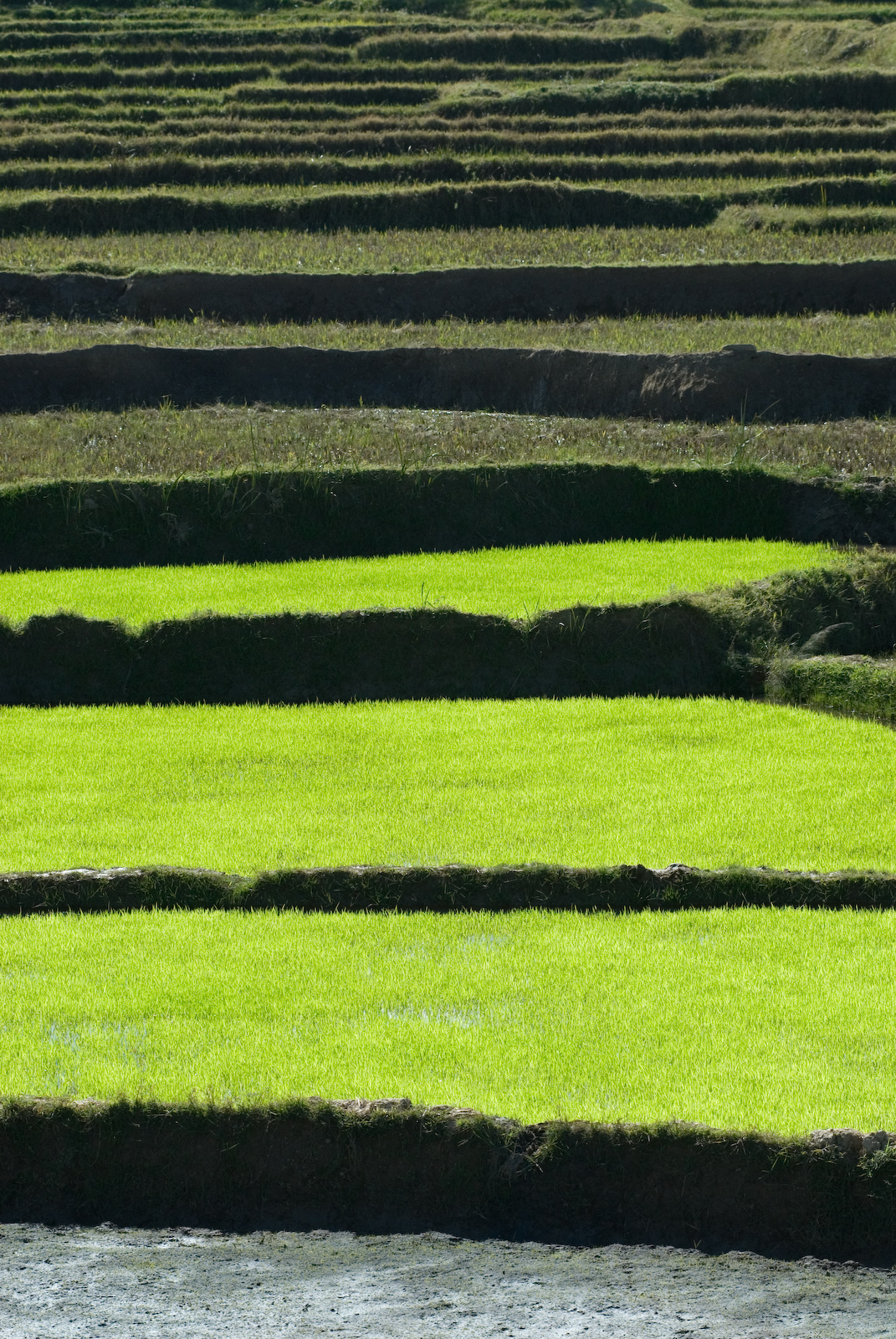
The landscape surrounding Betafo, the capital of one of four ancient kingdoms of the Betsileo people, exemplifies the traditional terraced rice paddies and irrigation systems that emerged in this part of the southern highlands in the 17th century.

The precise origin of savika remains uncertain beyond its ancient presence alongside Betsileo rice cultivation and zebu raising. It is accepted that savika began as a utile game between rice farmers and their cattle before becoming a sport. It has been proposed that savika developed out of social necessity, as a ritual for young men to overcome their fear of the culturally-vital animal. Lucien Marie Aimé Rakotozafy identified remnants of reinforced zebu pits as archaeological evidence of ancient Betsileo savika.

One theory of cultural origin contends shared lineage with jallikattu, an Indian bare-handed zebu-wrestling sport which predates the common era. In 1882, the common practice of zebu-wrestling between the Betsileo and Toda peoples was raised as evidence of early Indian contact with Madagascar.

==== Traditional and legendary explanations ====
Numerous stories in Malagasy oral tradition offer explanations for savika's origin.

One myth links the practice to Betsileo burial customs, where the dead are interred in marshes subsequently flattened by cattle. This act, meant to return the deceased to the earth and enhance the land's fertility, inadvertently evoked deep anguish among bereaved early Betsileo families. Overwhelmed by the sight of zebu walking on their loved ones' graves, grief-stricken men tackled the zebu as a cathartic outlet for their sorrow and anger, thus initiating the tradition of savika.

Another story, explaining the origin of savika an-tanimbary ('savika in the rice paddies'), points to the hosy, the rizicultural mud-trampling performed by Betsileo men and cattle to soften the soil and nourish young rice plants. This task's irritating monotony would drive the zebu to charge at their farmers, who in turn would grab them by the horns to avoid being impaled. These clashes became wrestling matches as the farmer and ox struggled against each other in the slippery paddy.

A third account posits that the tradition originated from the need to periodically manage free-roaming cattle. Men would engage with escapee oxen every two weeks, using a combination of coaxing and playful confrontation to eventually capture the animal and return him to the village. Savika's approach and dodging maneuvers are specifically identified with this origin. Alternatively, zebu were deliberately raised free-range, and men developed savika as they had to capture the animal for treatment or slaughter.

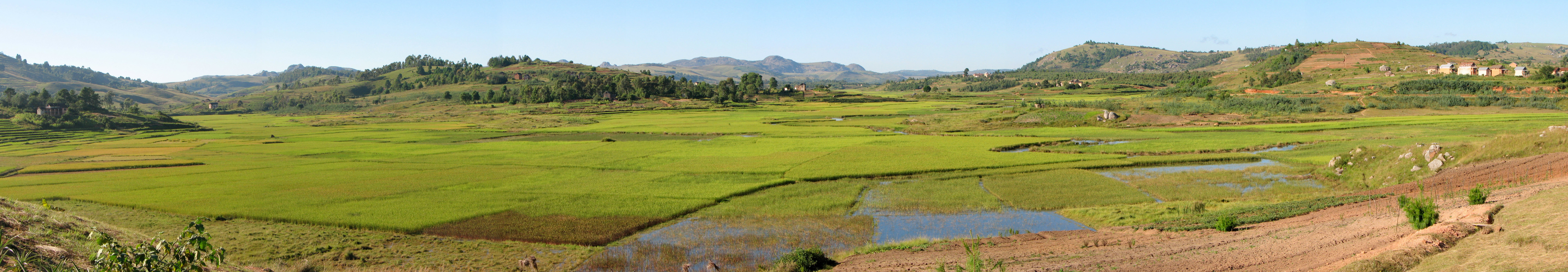
Irrigated paddy fields, characteristic of Madagascar's Betsileo Central Highlands, feature in legends explaining savika's origins.

=== Modern history ===
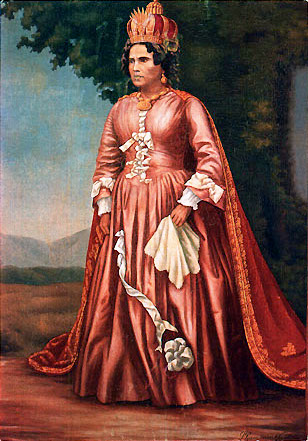
Queen Ranavalona I kept a herd of 400 fighting zebu, and was said to have been seen crying for the first time only after the death of her favorite ox.

Queen Ranavalona I, the regnant of the Madagascar's Merina Kingdom from 1828 to 1861, was a noted enthusiast of bull-fighting, keeping 400 fighting oxen (who fought humans and oxen alike) in her service. One of her two most powerful zebu, named Ikambo, died of old age and received a "pompous funeral", being buried under a headstone wearing a lamba. One account of Ranavalona I reports that no one had ever seen the Queen cry, even in the deaths of her parents, siblings, children, and husband, until the death of her favorite zebu. Ikambo's lamba-clad corpse was inadvertently rediscovered in the late 19th century by workers digging out the foundations for a new gateway to the royal courtyard. Ranavalona I also organized an enclosed zebu-wrestling competition to celebrate the circumcision of her son Radama II.

Both Protestant and Catholic clergy rejected savika as they arrived to the island in the 19th century; savika was deemed a sin, and Catholic Malagasy who witnessed or participated in savika were excommunicated over the twentieth century. During the French colonial period beginning in 1896, savika was prohibited. A 1936 conference of missionaries in Madagascar's identified "tolon'omby" as a pagan practice requiring precise guidelines on permissibility. Despite these sanctions, savika persisted in rural communities and during village festivities.

==== Contemporary standardization ====
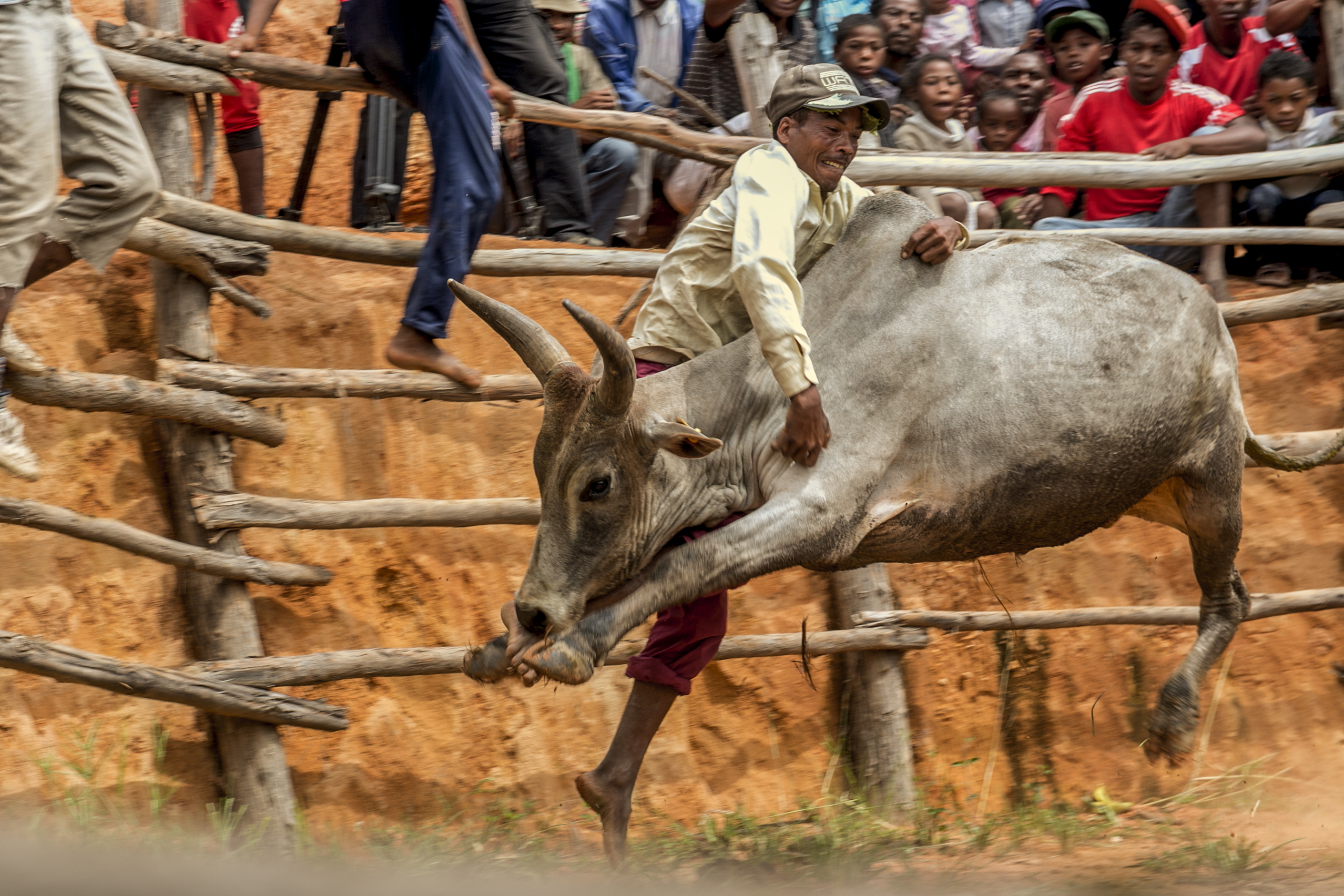
Traditional outdoor savika like the one pictured above have been joined in recent decades by standardized sporting events taking place in stadiums.

Today, savika persists in the Ambositra region, and has spread outside of Betsileo country to the Merina regions, where it is called tolon'omby. On special occasions, it takes place on the outskirts of the mostly-Merina capital city of Antananarivo. As the practice has developed in Merina country since the 1980s, it has grown into a professional sport, with professionally-coached wrestlers joining a tradition that was historically maintained only by village and family. In 2001, the Association savika d'Amoron'i Mania ('Amoron'i Mania Savika Association') was legally established in order to standardize and regulate savika as a sport, and recreational and urban savika proliferated as a result.

Wooden stands for savika spectators and officials were built in Fahizay in 1988, along with waiting pens for zebu, who traditionally had to be chased from pasture into the arena. A miniature savika stadium was built at a college in Antananarivo in 1999. The Savika Association built a stadium seating 10,000 between 2003 and 2004. Modernized savika and tolon'omby feature well-organized teams who seek to score points for specific maneuvers and figures, recorded and validated by judges and referees using score sheets. Contemporary savika spectacles, which often feature variety performers and musicians to supplement the spectacle, have developed codified rules and are often better-attended than soccer and rugby matches. According to the rules of formalized savika, only wrestlers receiving professional training may compete.

Fighters in spectacle savika are rewarded with cash prizes and soap for washing clothing soiled from the fight, negotiated based on the combatant zebu's fierceness. Additional prizes awarded to competitive mpisavika include clothing, radios, televisions, and bicycles. Trophies and cups are not appreciated by the best fighters, who are largely rural and see no use for them, and are thus less common than utilitarian rewards. Local businesses sponsor individual fighters and teams, displaying advertising banners in the stadiums and providing t-shirts printed with the company's logo.

While traditional savika often sees owners provide oxen out of fihavanana (a spirit of communal giving to which zebu are central), zebu in modernized sport are always paid for. Ernest Ratsimbazafy observes that the traditional kabary orations preceding fights are often shouted or whistled through by the crowds at savika spectacles. Generally, modernized savika have been met with controversy and debate among the peoples from which the practice originated, some of whom protest at what they see to be the commercialization of the practice.

== Human safety ==
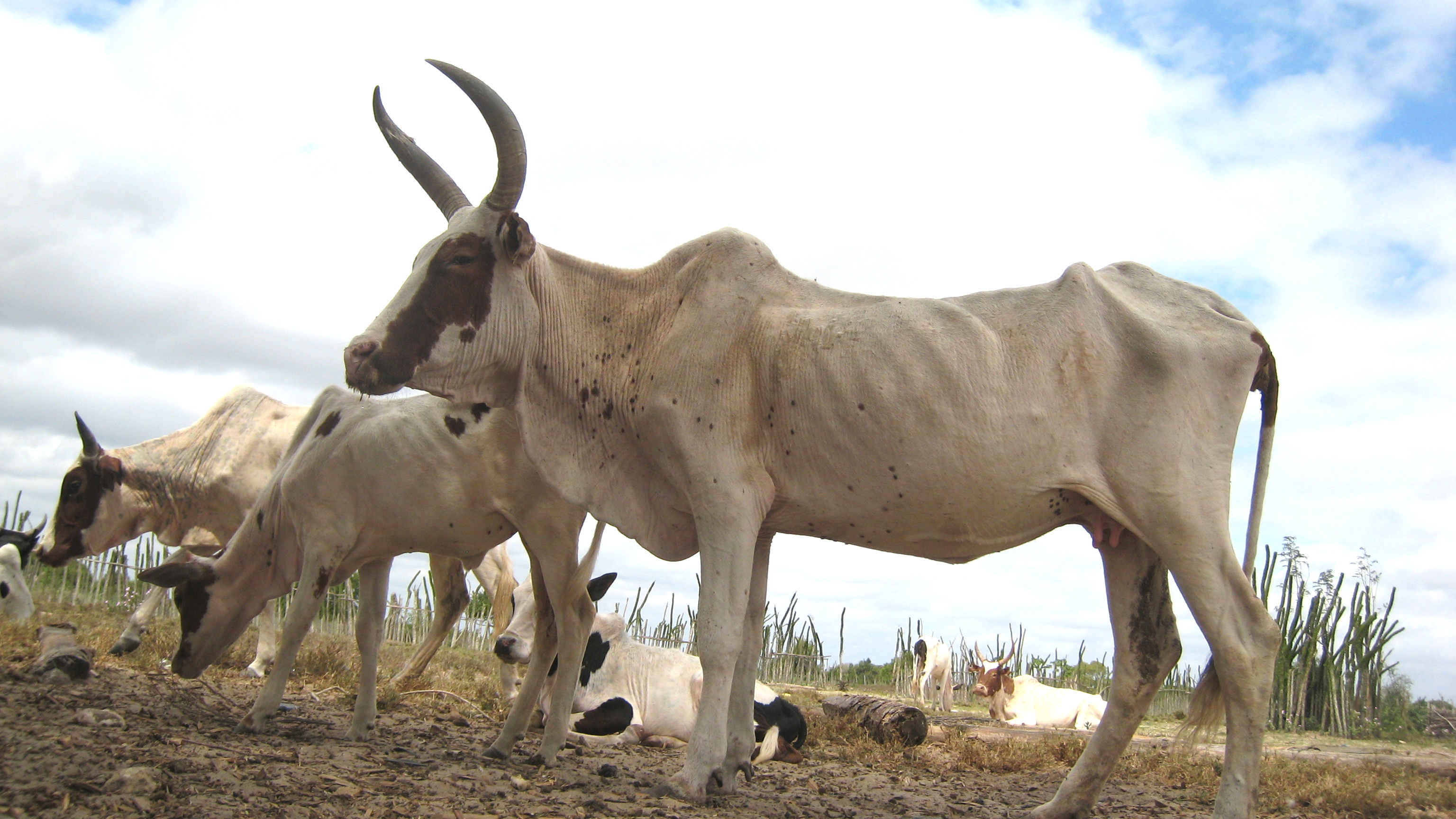
The powerful horns of Malagasy zebu can lead to serious goring injuries and even death.

Savika often take place during festivities and rituals which involve drinking alcohol; as a result, drunken fighters often enter the ring and are "immediately toppled by furious zebus". Mpisavika who fall on the ground are often trampled or gored by the ox. Gorings from zebu horns are a common risk, and deaths from savika have been reported. A 2020 study of an Antananarivo hospital found savika to be the most common cause of domestic injuries resulting in vascular trauma to the limbs requiring surgery. A 2018 study of thoracic trauma linked savika to the fact that 5% of chest injuries in Madagascar are zebu-related. Penile and scrotal injuries from savika have been recorded.

Fighters in modernized savika are less observant of taboos and rites associated with fighting, raising risk of injury in the sport as traditional wisdom is less heeded. The more competitive nature of modern savika (as opposed to the more communal traditional form) also results in higher rates of injury. The role of ombiasy healers has presented a challenge for modernized savika: many injured players shun modern healthcare, instead seeking instant magical healing from the ombiasy.

== See also ==
- Rodeo
- Steer wrestling
- Moraingy
- Bullfighting
- Bull-leaping
- Guanniu
