= Andina, Ambositra =

Andina
- Location in Madagascar
- Coordinates: 20°31′S 47°09′E
- Country: Madagascar
- Region: Amoron'i Mania
- District: Ambositra

Government
  - Mayor: Raphaël Rakotozandrindrainy
- Elevation: 1,320 m (4,330 ft)
- Time zone: UTC3 (EAT)
- Postal code: 306

Andina is a rural municipality in Madagascar. It belongs to the district of Ambositra, which is a part of Amoron'i Mania Region.

== Geography ==
It is situated at 17 km West from Ambositra.

== Mining ==
There is a Amazonite mine in this municipality.

== Rivers ==
The municipality is situated at the Sahasaonjo river.

== Economy ==
There is a tomato transforming plant in the village of Ampasinabe.
