= Ambositra II =

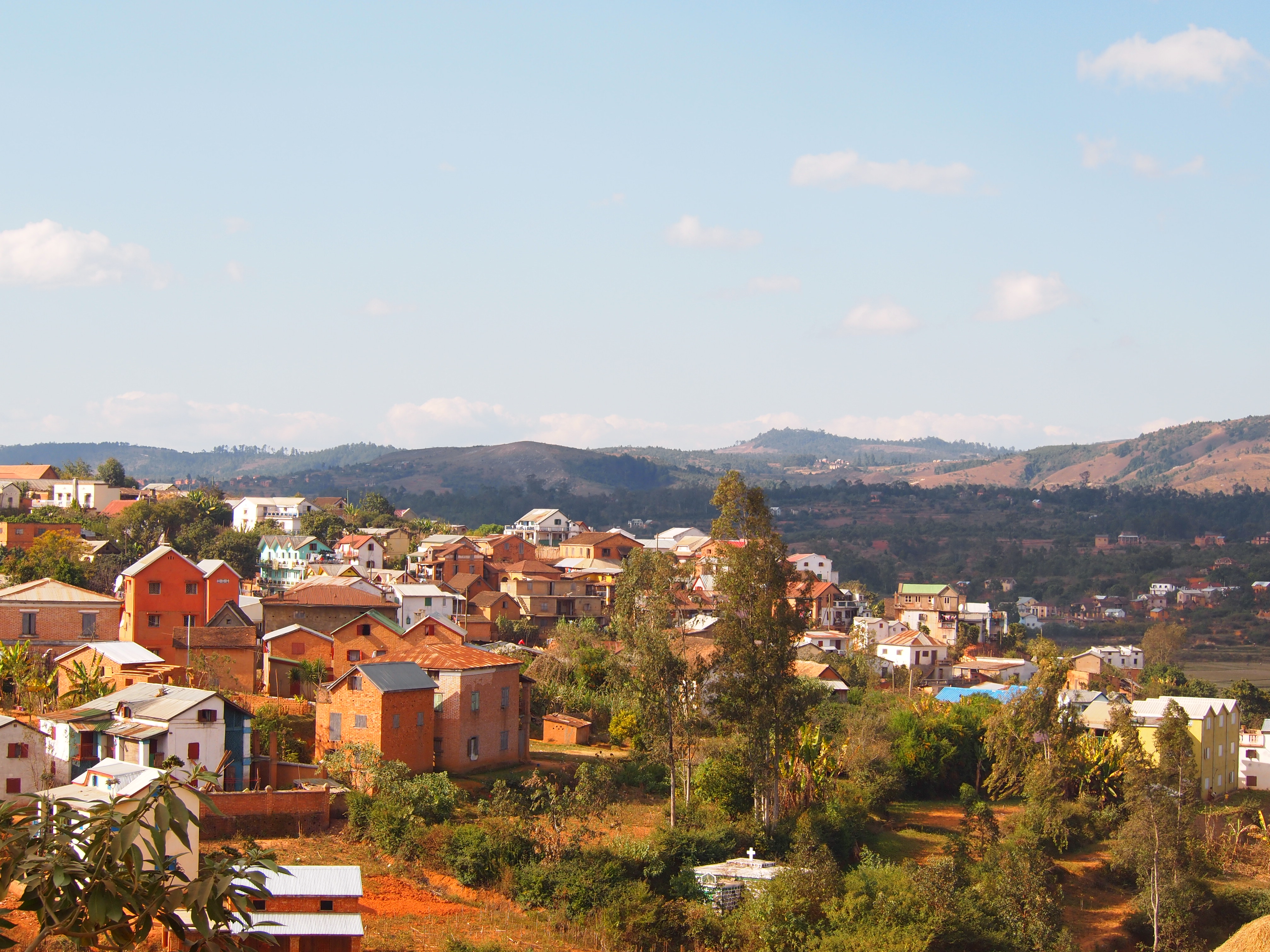
- View of Ambositra

- Location in Madagascar
- Coordinates: 20°31′0″S 47°15′0″E
- Country: Madagascar
- Region: Amoron'i Mania
- District: Ambositra
- Elevation: 1,342 m (4,403 ft)
- Postal code: 306

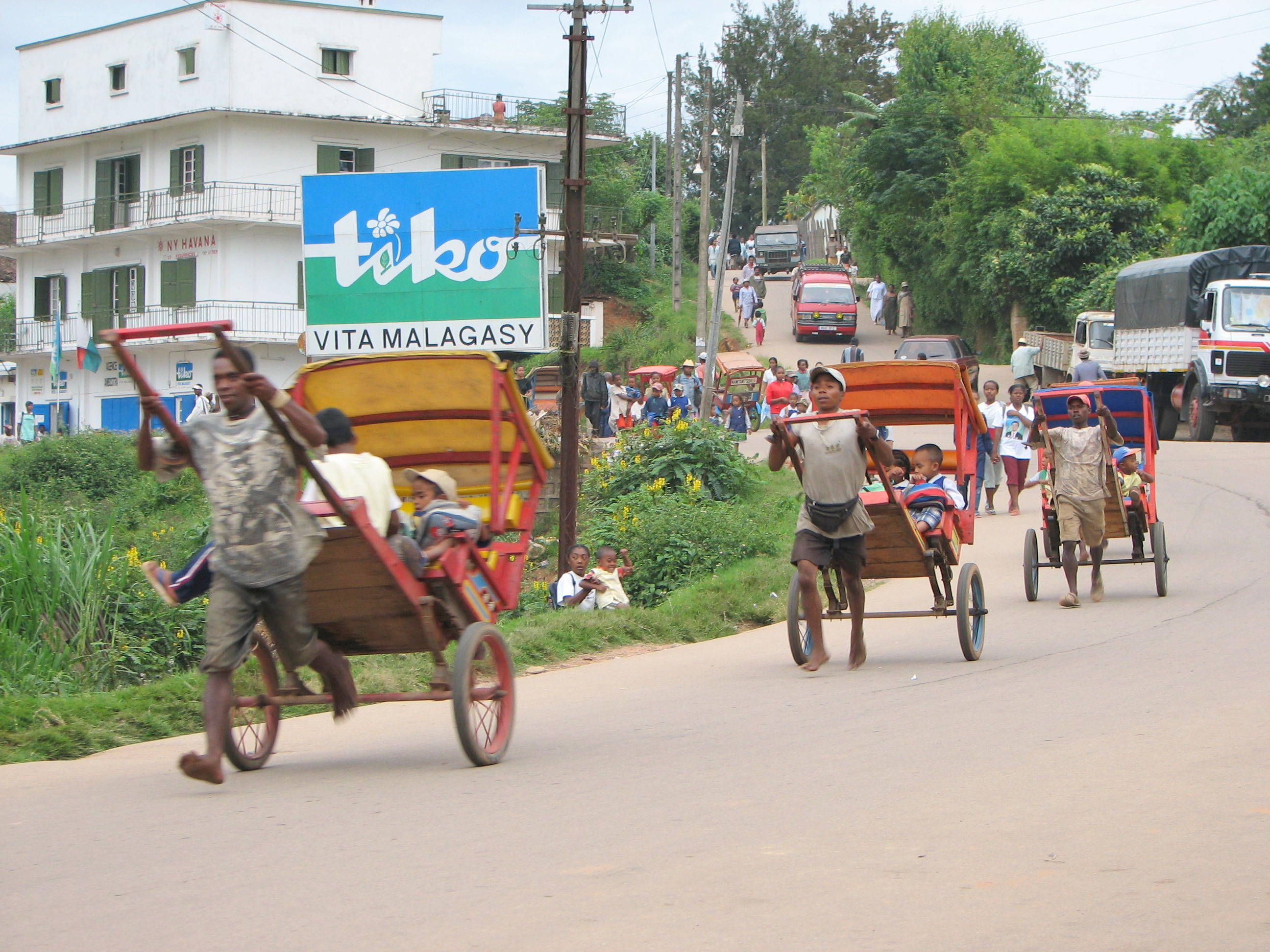
Ambositra

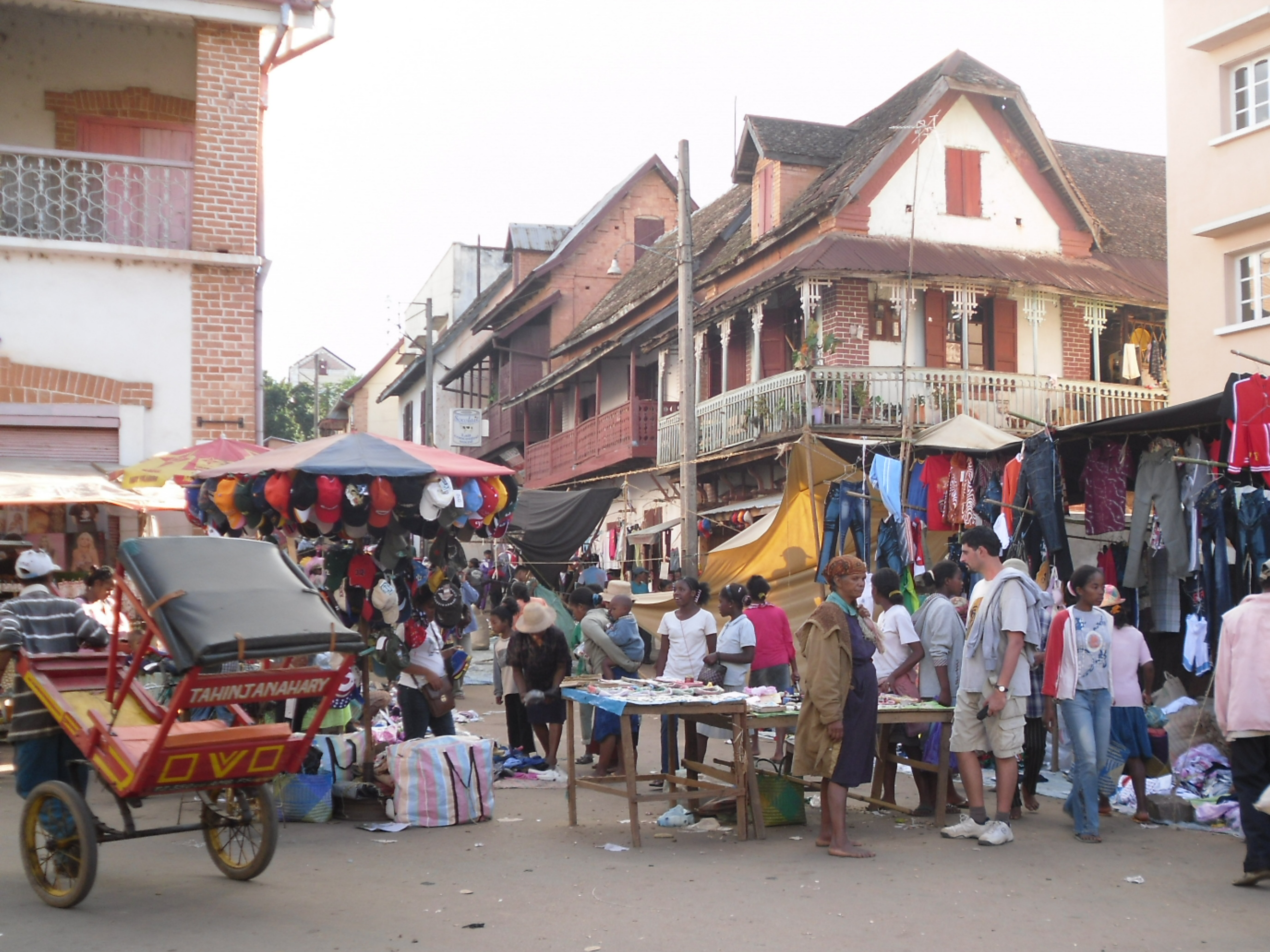
Ambositra

Ambositra II is a rural municipality in central Madagascar in the Amoron'i Mania region.

It covers the rural villages of the outskirts of the city of Ambositra. It is the centre of Madagascar's' wood-carving industry.

== Infrastructure ==
It is situated at the RN 7 (Antsirabe - Tulear);
