= Ilaka Centre =

Ilaka Centre Ilaka Afovoany
- Location in Madagascar
- Coordinates: 20°20′S 47°9′E
- Country: Madagascar
- Region: Amoron'i Mania
- District: Ambositra

Area
  - Total: 452 km^{2} (175 sq mi)
- Elevation: 1,423 m (4,669 ft)

Population (2001)
  - Total: 15,000
- Time zone: UTC3 (EAT)
- Postal code: 306

Ilaka Centre (Malagasy: Ilaka Afovoany) is a rural municipality in Madagascar. It belongs to the district of Ambositra, which is a part of Amoron'i Mania Region. The population of the commune was estimated to be approximately 15,000 in 2001 commune census.

Primary and junior level secondary education are available in town. It is also a site of industrial-scale mining. The majority 90% of the population of the commune are farmers, while an additional 7.5% receives their livelihood from raising livestock. The most important crop is rice, while other important products are peanuts, beans and cassava. Industry and services provide employment for 0.5% and 2% of the population, respectively.

== Geography ==
Ilaka Centre is situated alongside the National road 7 between Antsirabe and Ambositra (25 km). It is situated on the Mania River and the Isandra River.
