= Vohidahy =

- Location in Madagascar
- Coordinates: 20°51′08″S 47°57′03″E
- Country: Madagascar
- Region: Amoron'i Mania
- District: Ambositra
- Established: 2014
- Elevation: 1,700 m (5,600 ft)

Population
  - Ethnicities: Betsileo
- Time zone: UTC3 (EAT)
- Postal code: 306

Vohidahy is a rural municipality in Madagascar. It belongs to the district of Ambositra, which is a part of Amoron'i Mania Region.

== Nature ==
The Tapia forest of Vohidahy supplies the town with fruits, champignons and wild silk.
