= Sahatsiho Ambohimanjaka =

- Location in Madagascar
- Coordinates: 20°13′12″S 47°05′40″E
- Country: Madagascar
- Region: Amoron'i Mania
- District: Ambositra

Area
  - Total: 333.06 km^{2} (128.60 sq mi)
- Elevation: 1,478 m (4,849 ft)

Population (2001)
  - Total: 9,000
  - Ethnicities: mainly Betsileo and Merina
- Time zone: UTC3 (EAT)
- Postal code: 306

Sahatsiho Ambohimanjaka is a rural municipality in Madagascar. It belongs to the district of Ambositra, which is a part of Amoron'i Mania region. The population of the commune was estimated to be approximately 9,000 in 2001 commune census.

Primary and junior level secondary education are available in town. It is also a site of industrial-scale mining. The majority 95% of the population of the commune are farmers, while an additional 4.5% receives their livelihood from raising livestock. The most important crops are rice and maize, while other important agricultural products are beans and cassava. Industry and services provide employment for 0.3% and 0.2% of the population, respectively.

== Geography ==
This municipality is situated at 39 km souths of Antsirabe and 53 km north of Ambositra. It is crossed by the National road 7.

== Nature ==
The Tapia forest of Sahatsiho Ambohimanjaka supplies the town with fruits, champignons and wild silk.

== Tourist sights ==
- Antalavena Falls on the Antalavena river.
- Sahatsiho river
