= Ambinanindrano (disambiguation) =

Ambinanindrano is the name of several municipalities in Madagascar:

- Ambinanindrano, Ambositra - a municipality in Amoron'i Mania
- Ambinanindrano - a municipality in Mahanoro District, in Atsinanana
