= Tsarasaotra (disambiguation) =

Tsarasaotra is the name of several municipalities in Madagascar;

- Tsarasaotra, in the region of Amoron'i Mania
- Tsarasaotra, Anjozorobe, in the region of Analamanga.
- Tsarasaotra Park - a privately run lake and bird's park in Antananarivo
