= Marosoa =

- Location in Madagascar
- Coordinates: 20°32′S 47°23′E
- Country: Madagascar
- Region: Amoron'i Mania
- District: Ambositra
- Elevation: 1,399 m (4,590 ft)

Population (2001)
  - Total: 12,000
- Time zone: UTC3 (EAT)

Marosoa is a town and commune in Madagascar. It belongs to the district of Ambositra, which is a part of Amoron'i Mania Region. The population of the commune was estimated to be approximately 12,000 in 2001 commune census.

Primary and junior level secondary education are available in town. The majority 95% of the population of the commune are farmers. The most important crops are rice and cassava, while other important agricultural products are sweet potatoes and potatoes. Services provide employment for 5% of the population.
