= Ivony Miaramiasa =

- Location in Madagascar
- Coordinates: 20°36′S 47°10′E
- Country: Madagascar
- Region: Amoron'i Mania
- District: Ambositra
- Elevation: 1,657 m (5,436 ft)

Population (2001)
  - Total: 6,000
- Time zone: UTC3 (EAT)

Ivony Miaramiasa is a town and commune in Madagascar. It belongs to the district of Ambositra, which is a part of Amoron'i Mania Region. The population of the commune was estimated to be approximately 6,000 in 2001 commune census.

Primary and junior level secondary education are available in town. The majority 99.5% of the population of the commune are farmers, while an additional 0.3% receives their livelihood from raising livestock. The most important crops are rice and oranges, while other important agricultural products are beans, potatoes and tomato. Services provide employment for 0.2% of the population.
