= Kianjandrakefina =

- Location in Madagascar
- Coordinates: 20°38′S 47°22′E
- Country: Madagascar
- Region: Amoron'i Mania
- District: Ambositra

Government
  - Major: Noely Bary Gasy
- Elevation: 1,346 m (4,416 ft)

Population (2001)
  - Total: 12,000
- Time zone: UTC3 (EAT)

Kianjandrakefina is a town and commune in Madagascar. It belongs to the district of Ambositra, which is a part of Amoron'i Mania Region.

== Population ==
The population of the commune was estimated to be approximately 12,000 in 2001 commune census.

In addition to primary schooling the town offers secondary education at both junior and senior levels. The majority 80% of the population of the commune are farmers. The most important crops are rice and peanuts, while other important agricultural products are cassava, sweet potatoes and potatoes. Services provide employment for 20% of the population.
