= Ambalandingana =

Village in Madagascar

Coordinates: 20°47′07″S 47°17′59″E

Ambalandingana is a small village in the Amoron'i Mania region of Madagascar, Africa. The village is known for its woodcarving capabilities and is often used as a stop-over village for travelers.

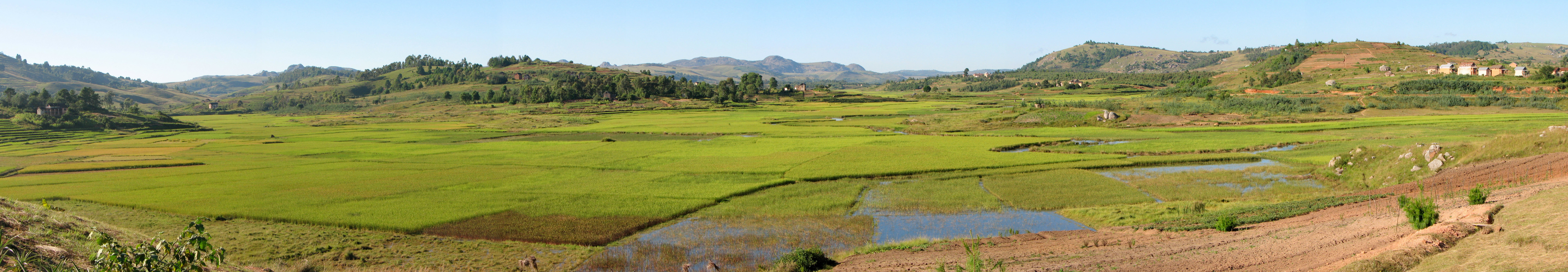
Rice fields near Ambalandingana, Madagascar
