= Mahazina Ambohipierenana =

Coordinates: 20°21′S 47°05′E

- Interactive map of Mahazina Ambohipierenana
- Country: Madagascar
- Region: Amoron'i Mania
- District: Ambositra

Population (2001)
  - Total: 5,000
- Time zone: UTC3 (EAT)

Mahazina Ambohipierenana is a town and commune in Madagascar. It belongs to the district of Ambositra, which is a part of Amoron'i Mania Region. The population of the commune was estimated to be approximately 5,000 in 2001 commune census.

Only primary schooling is available. The majority 97.9% of the population of the commune are farmers, while an additional 2% receives their livelihood from raising livestock. The most important crop is rice, while other important products are peanuts, beans, maize and cassava. Services provide employment for 0.1% of the population.
