= Ambohimitombo =

- Location in Madagascar
- Coordinates: 20°43′S 47°26′E
- Country: Madagascar
- Region: Amoron'i Mania
- District: Ambositra
- Elevation: 1,230 m (4,040 ft)

Population (2001)
  - Total: 14,000
- Time zone: UTC3 (EAT)

Ambohimitombo is a town and commune in Madagascar. It belongs to the district of Ambositra, which is a part of Amoron'i Mania Region. The population of the commune was estimated to be approximately 14,000 in 2001 commune census.

Primary and junior level secondary education are available in town. The majority 95% of the population of the commune are farmers, while an additional 3% receives their livelihood from raising livestock. The most important crop is maize, while other important products are beans, rice and taro. Industry and services provide both employment for 1% of the population.
