= Ambalamanakana =

- Location in Madagascar
- Coordinates: 20°44′S 47°11′E
- Country: Madagascar
- Region: Amoron'i Mania
- District: Ambositra
- Elevation: 1,630 m (5,350 ft)

Population (2001)
  - Total: 6,000
- Time zone: UTC3 (EAT)
- Climate: Cwb

Ambalamanakana is a town and commune in Madagascar. It belongs to the district of Ambositra, which is a part of Amoron'i Mania region. The population of the commune was estimated to be approximately 6,000 in the 2001 commune census.

Only primary schooling is available. The majority 95% of the population of the commune are farmers. The most important crop is rice while other important products are cabbage, beans, maize and potatoes. Services provide employment for 5% of the population.
