= Ambatofitorahana =

- Location in Madagascar
- Coordinates: 20°49′S 47°11′E
- Country: Madagascar
- Region: Amoron'i Mania
- District: Ambositra
- Elevation: 1,657 m (5,436 ft)

Population (2001)
  - Total: 7,000
- Time zone: UTC3 (EAT)

Ambatofitorahana is a town and commune in Madagascar. It belongs to the district of Ambositra, which is a part of Amoron'i Mania Region. The population of the commune was estimated to be approximately 7,000 in 2001 commune census.

Primary and junior level secondary education are available in town. The majority 95% of the population of the commune are farmers. The most important crop is rice, while other important products are beans, maize and oranges. Industry and services provide employment for 2% and 3% of the population, respectively.
