= Alakamisy Ambohijato =

Coordinates: 20°34′26″S 47°21′00″E

- Interactive map of Alakamisy Ambohijato
- Country: Madagascar
- Region: Amoron'i Mania
- District: Ambositra

Population (2001)
  - Total: 8,000
- Time zone: UTC3 (EAT)
- Climate: Cfb

Alakamisy Ambohijato is a town and commune in Madagascar. It belongs to Ambositra District, which is a part of Amoron'i Mania Region. The population of the commune was estimated to be approximately 8,000 in 2001 commune census.

Primary and junior level secondary education are available in town. The majority 98.9% of the population of the commune are farmers, while an additional 0.5% receives their livelihood from raising livestock. The most important crops are rice and potatoes, while other important agricultural products are cassava and sweet potatoes. Services provide employment for 0.5% of the population. Additionally fishing employs 0.1% of the population.
