= Ambinanindrano, Ambositra =

Ambinanindrano
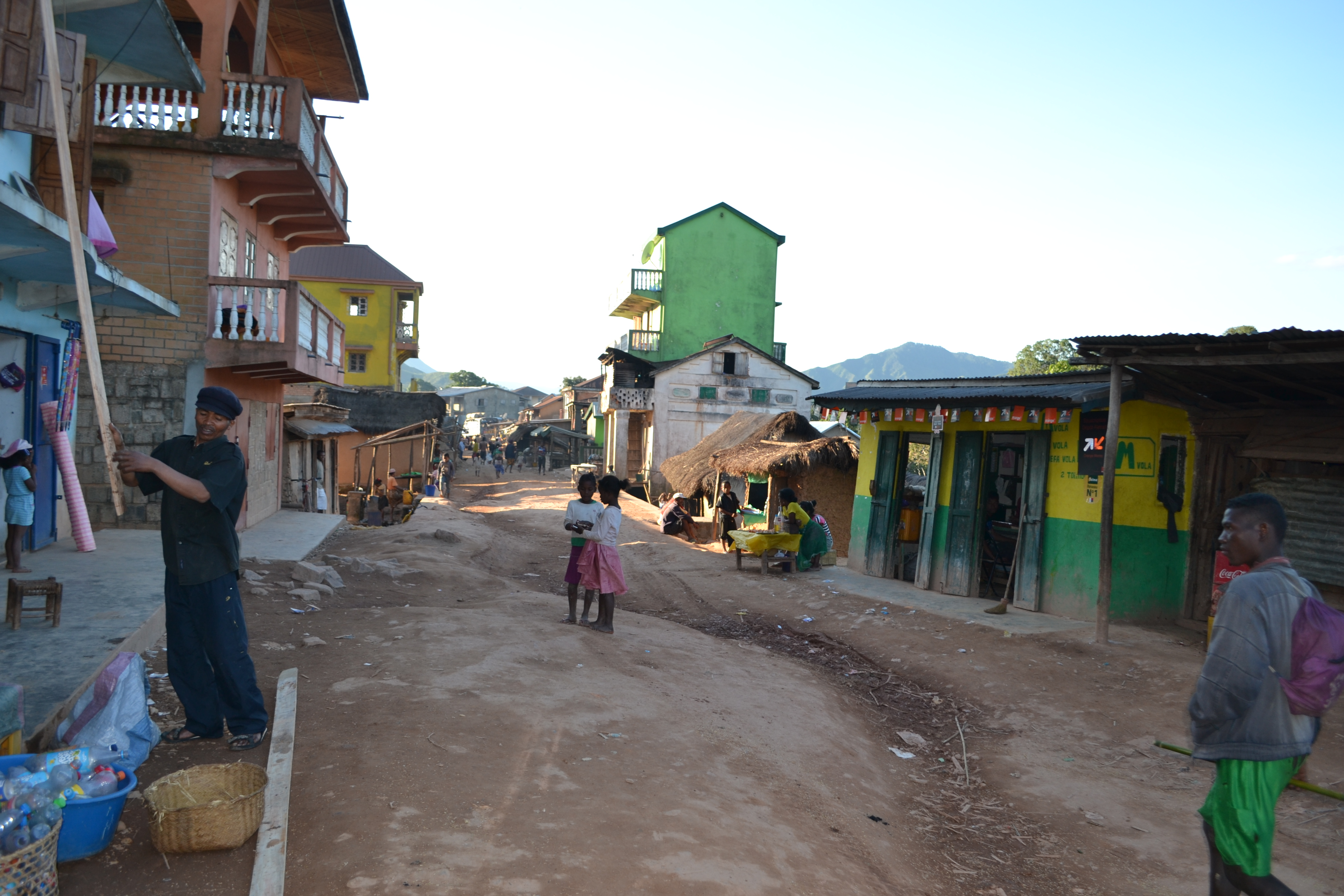
- Ambinanindrano

- Location in Madagascar
- Coordinates: 21°05′S 47°57′E
- Country: Madagascar
- Region: Amoron'i Mania
- District: Ambositra

Area
  - Total: 400 km^{2} (150 sq mi)
- Elevation: 678 m (2,224 ft)

Population (2019)Census
  - Total: 21,364
- Time zone: UTC3 (EAT)

Ambinanindrano is a rural municipality in Madagascar. It belongs to the district of Ambositra, which is a part of Amoron'i Mania Region. The population of the municipality had been 21,364 in 2019.

It is situated at 60 km from Ambositra. It is a main region of sugar cane plantations of the region, rhum is its main product. It is linked to Ambositra by the unpaved Provincial Road 3F, that is in a very bad state of conversation.

Primary and junior level secondary education are available in town. The majority 90% of the population of the commune are farmers. The most important crop is sugarcane, while other important products are beans, cassava and rice. Services provide employment for 10% of the population.
