= Imerina Imady =

- Location in Madagascar
- Coordinates: 20°32′S 47°20′E
- Country: Madagascar
- Region: Amoron'i Mania
- District: Ambositra
- Elevation: 1,358 m (4,455 ft)

Population (2001)
  - Total: 13,000
- Time zone: UTC3 (EAT)

Imerina Imady is a town and commune in Madagascar. It belongs to the district of Ambositra, which is a part of Amoron'i Mania Region. The population of the commune was estimated to be approximately 13,000 in 2001census.

Primary and junior level secondary education are available in town. The majority 85% of the population of the commune are farmers, while an additional 5% receives their livelihood from raising livestock. The most important crops are rice and cassava, while other important agricultural products are beans, sweet potatoes and potatoes. Services provide employment for 10% of the population.
