= Ankazoambo =

- Location in Madagascar
- Coordinates: 20°35′S 47°16′E
- Country: Madagascar
- Region: Amoron'i Mania
- District: Ambositra
- Elevation: 1,510 m (4,950 ft)

Population (2001)
  - Total: 6,000
- Time zone: UTC3 (EAT)

Ankazoambo is a town and commune in Madagascar. It belongs to the district of Ambositra, which is a part of Amoron'i Mania region. The population of the commune was estimated to be approximately 6,000 in the 2001 commune census.

Primary and junior level secondary education are available in town. The majority 95% of the population of the commune are farmers, while an additional 3% receives their livelihood from raising livestock. The most important crops are rice and cassava, while other important agricultural products are beans and sweet potatoes. Services provide employment for 2% of the population.
