= Ambositra District =

District of Madagascar

Coordinates: 20°32′58″S 47°15′21″E

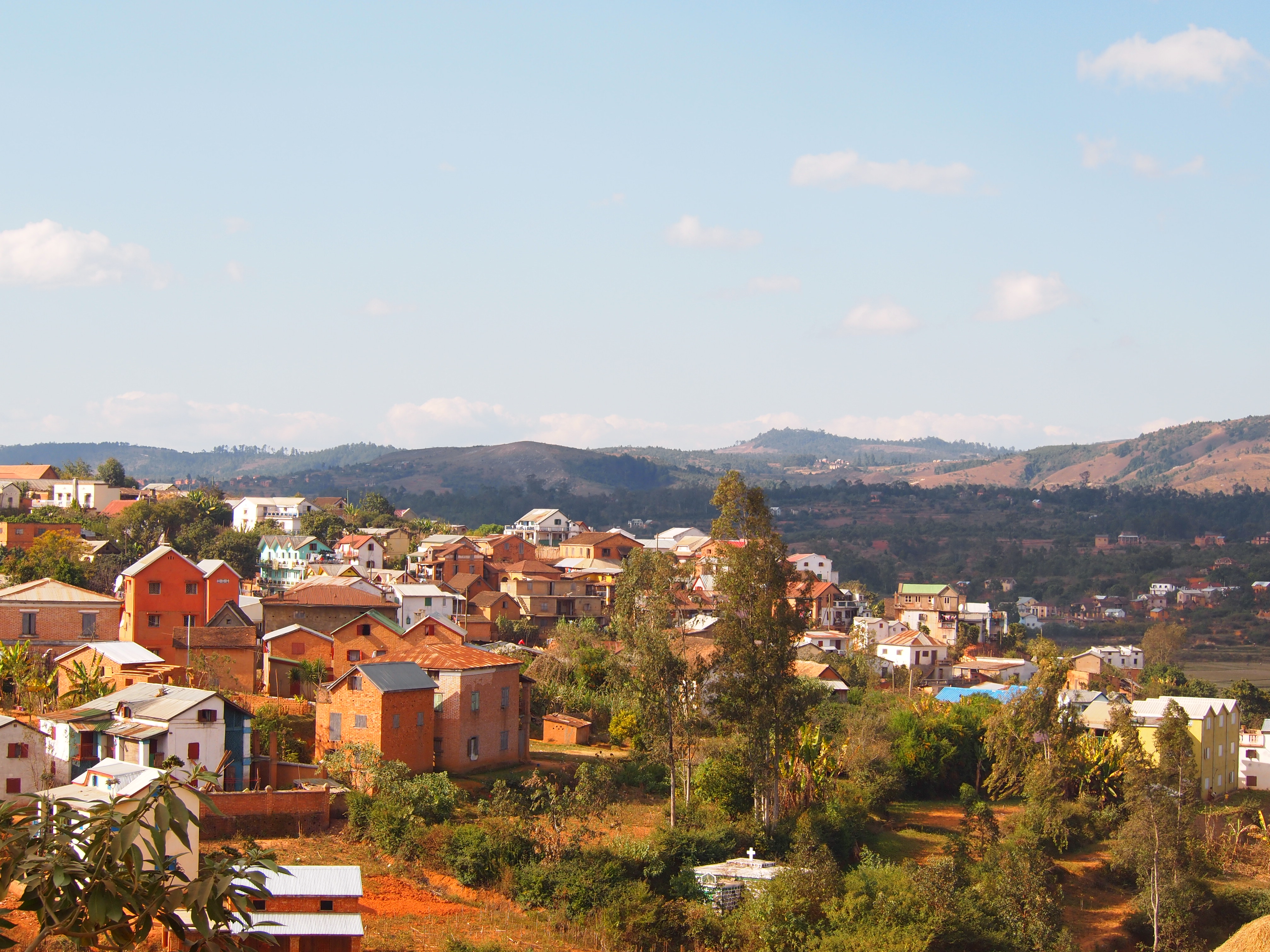
Ambositra skyline

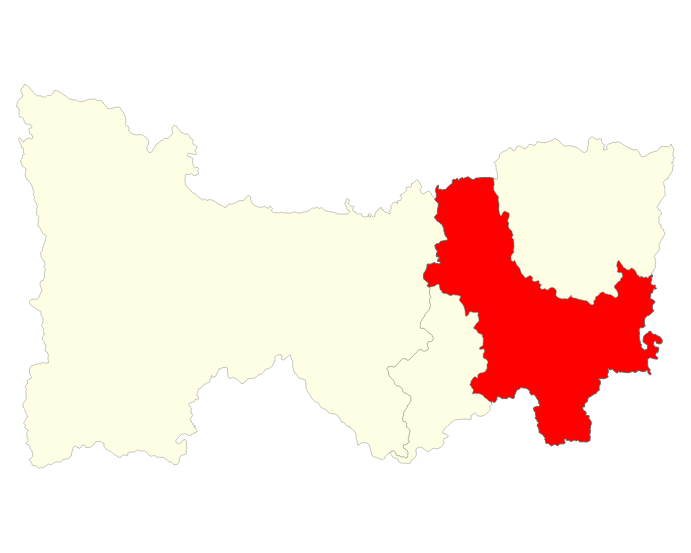
Ambositra District in Amoron'i Mania Region

Ambositra District is a district in central Madagascar. It is part of Amoron'i Mania Region. Its capital is Ambositra. The district has an area of 2,914 km^{2} (1,125 sq mi), and the estimated population in 2020 was 314,968.

== Communes ==
The district is further divided into 21 communes:

- Alakamisy Ambohijato
- Ambalamanakana
- Ambatofitorahana
- Ambinanindrano
- Ambohimitombo
- Ambositra
- Ambositra II
- Andina
- Ankazoambo
- Antoetra
- Fahizay Ambatolahimasina
- Ihadilanana
- Ilaka Centre
- Imerina Imady
- Ivato
- Ivony Miaramiasa
- Kianjandrakefina
- Mahazina Ambohipierenana
- Marosoa
- Sahatsiho Ambohimanjaka
- Tsarasaotra

== Roads ==
- the paved RN 7 from Antsirabe to Tulear.
- the Route nationale 35 from Ivato to Morondava.
- the unpaved Provincial Road 3F to Ambinanindrano.
- the National Road 41 from Ambositra to Fandriana.

== Mining ==
There is an Amazonite mine in the municipality of Andina.

== Protected areas ==
- Part of Ambositra-Vondrozo Forest Corridor, a protected harmonious landscape
- Part of Marolambo National Park.
