= Tsarasaotra =

- Location in Madagascar
- Coordinates: 20°26′S 47°14′E
- Country: Madagascar
- Region: Amoron'i Mania
- District: Ambositra
- Elevation: 1,310 m (4,300 ft)

Population (2001)
  - Total: 21,000
- Time zone: UTC3 (EAT)

Tsarasaotra is a town and commune in Madagascar. It belongs to the district of Ambositra, which is a part of Amoron'i Mania Region. In the 2001 commune census, the population of the commune was estimated to be approximately 21,000.

Primary and junior level secondary education are available in town. 95% of the population of the commune are farmers, while an additional 3% receive their livelihood from raising livestock. The most important crops are rice and potatoes, along with beans and cassava. Industry and services provide employment for 1% of the population.

== History ==
In June 1895, as part of the Madagascar expedition, the village was the site of a battle between Hovas warriors and French troops of the Metzinger brigade, commanded by Lieutenant-Colonel Lentonnet.
