= Antoetra =

Town in Madagascar

Coordinates: 20°46′30″S 47°18′58″E

Antoetra is the capital for the county of Amoron'i Mania. As of 2001, an estimated 1,200 people lived in the town.

== Gallery ==
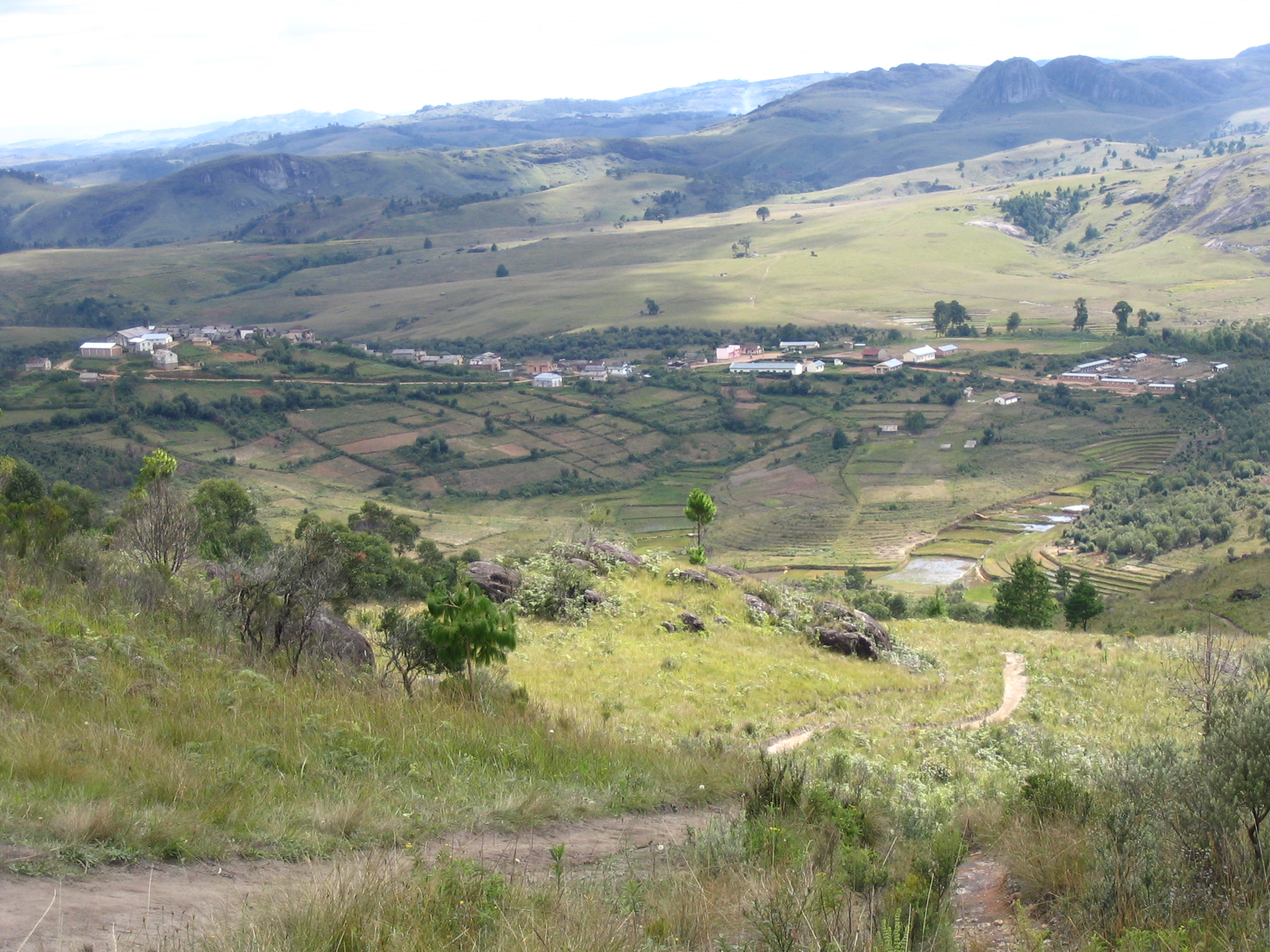
Photo of Antoetra

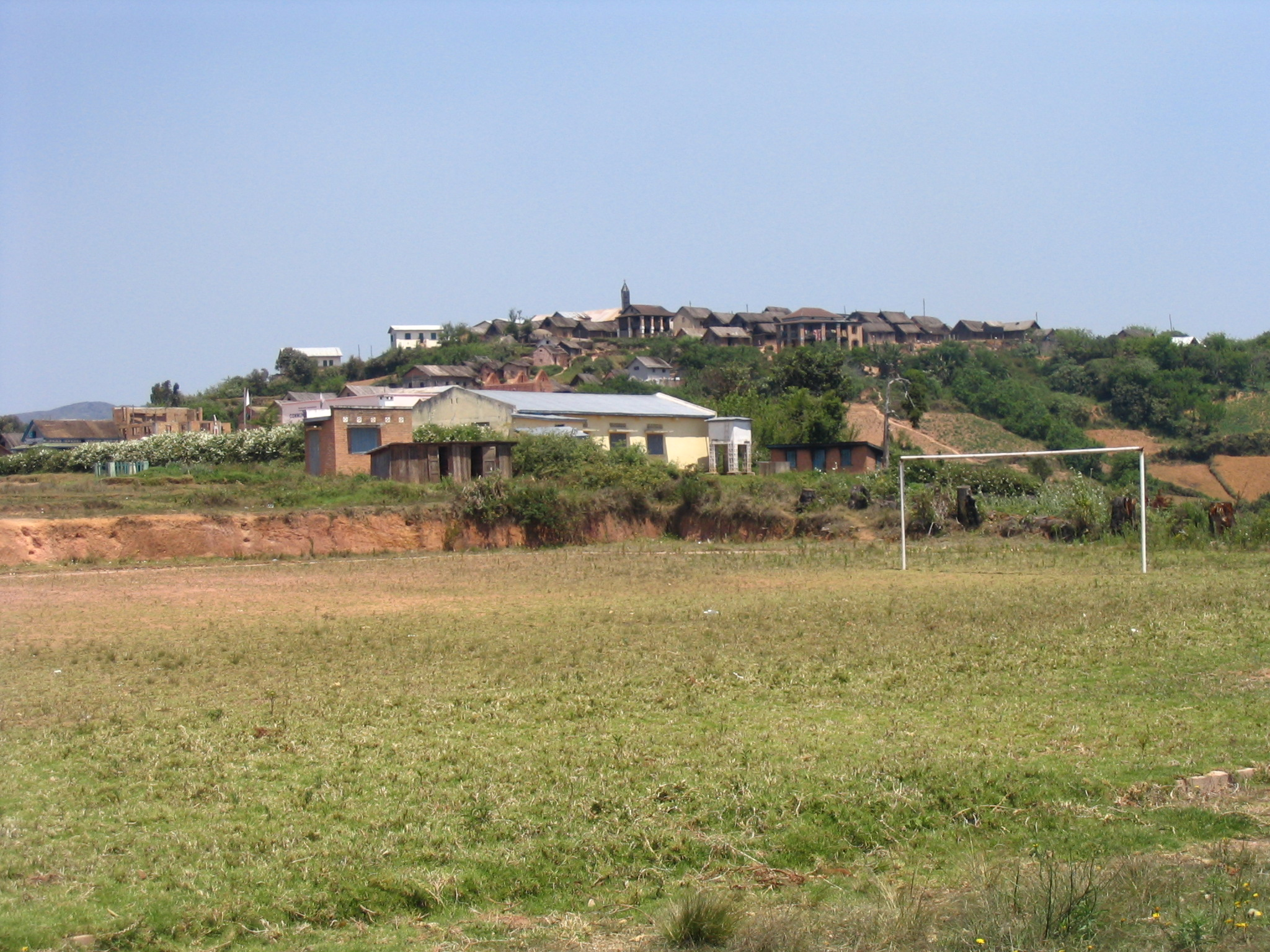
Front view of Antoetra from the football (soccer) field

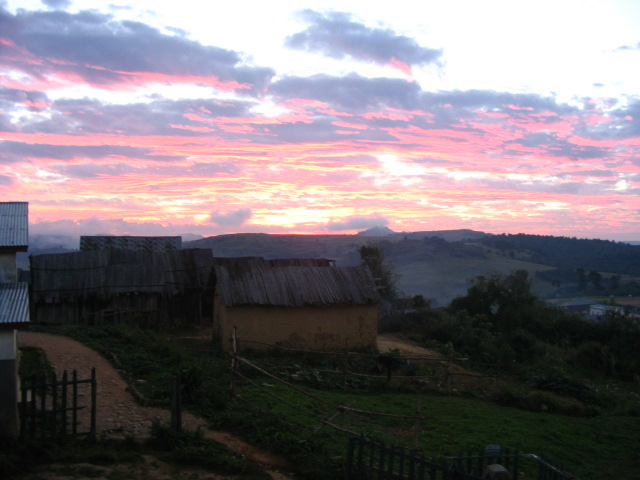
Dusk in Antoetra

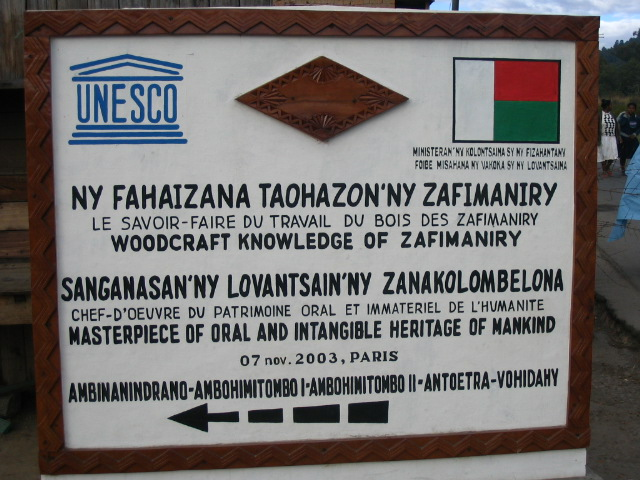
A plaque commemorating the achievements of the Zafimaniry for their skill with wood

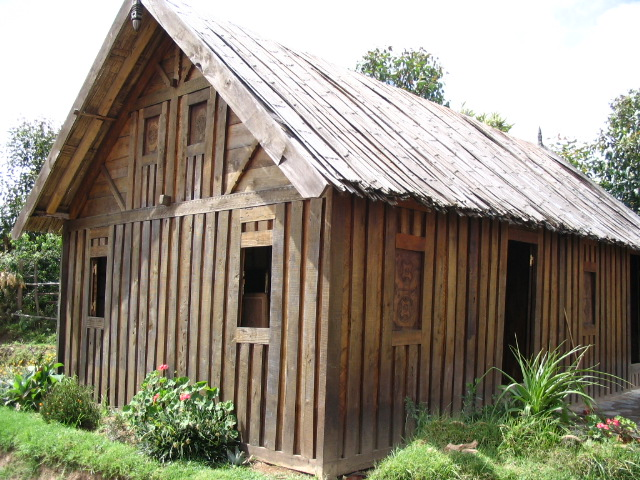
A typical Zafimaniry house

== See also ==
- Madagascar
- Ambositra
- Betsileo
- Amoron'i Mania
