= Guanniu =

Bullfighting in Jaixing, China

Guanniu 掼牛
- Status: Active
- Genre: bull wrestling contest
- Begins: Song dynasty and Yuan dynasty
- Country: China
- Founder: Hui people

Guanniu (simplified Chinese: 掼牛; traditional Chinese: 摜牛; pinyin: guan niú), also known as Chinese bullfighting or Chinese-style bullfighting, is a form of bull-wrestling contest held in Jiaxing, Zhejiang Province, China. It is also known as Hui bullfighting (回族斗牛). because it originated among the Hui people. The word guan means throwing, dropping, or tossing, and niu refers to cattle, so guanniu translates literally as 'wrestling with a bull'.

Guanniu began in the Yuan dynasty and originated in Jiaxing, Zhejiang, among the Hui people. Local men would test their strength against bulls weighing as much as 400 kg (880 lb). Contestants must force a bull on the ground with their bare hands within three minutes. Unlike Spanish-style bullfighting, which ends with the killing of the bull, guanniu traditionally ends when the bull is thrown down.

On May 23, 2011, Jiaxing Guanniui (嘉兴掼牛) was listed on China's National Intangible Cultural Heritage List.

== History ==
According to Hui tradition, long ago in a Hui settlement of nearly a thousand families, they slaughtered hundreds of cattle every year during the Eid al-Adha. Every time the cattle were slaughtered, they were herded together and four or five young and strong boys worked together with ropes and sticks to tie the cattle down. One time, when tying a large bull, a young man was injured by the bull and died soon after, causing much sorrow in the village. The next year, when Eid al-Adha was celebrated, a young man knocked down the bull without the help of others. The villagers were full of praise for this and spread his story widely. Under his influence, every year at the Eid al-Adha, many young men came to fling the bull one by one. Starting the annual guanniu event performed by the Hui people at the Eid al-Adha.

According to Jiaxing historical records, guanniu originated during the Song and Yuan dynasties. It was originally a traditional activity of the Hui people in China.

== Performances and competitions ==
In the 1920s and 1930s, martial artists competed in guanniu events to feed their families, usually performing the contests in entertainment venues. In 1982, Chinese athlete Han Haihua (韩海华) brought guanniu to audiences at home and abroad for the first time at the Second National Traditional Games of Ethnic Minorities of the People's Republic of China.

In June 2012, the First "China Guanniu" National Invitational Tournament (首届"中国掼牛"全国邀请赛) was held in Nanhu District, Jiaxing City.

== See also ==
- Savika — Betsileo bull-wrestling tradition
- Bull wrestling § East and Southeast Asia, bull against bull
