= Marolambo National Park =

National park in Madagascar

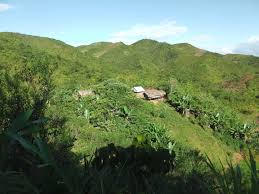

- Location within Madagascar
- Location: Madagascar
- Nearest city: Fandriana
- Coordinates: 20°00′S 47°40′E
- Area: 95,063 ha (234,910 acres)
- Visitors: 0 (in 2006)
- Governing body: Madagascar National Parks Association

The Marolambo National Park covers a forested region of Eastern Madagascar, between Marolambo (region: Atsinanana), Antanifotsy (region: Vakinankaratra), Fandriana (region: Amoron'i Mania), Nosy Varika (Vatovavy), Ifanadiana (Vatovavy) and Ambositra (Amoron'i Mania).

The highest waterfall of Madagascar is in this National Park: the Andrevaronina Falls on the Sakaleona River, with a height of 350m.

The office of the park is located at Fandriana (Amoron'i Mania). This park is of difficult access, during most of the year it can be accessed only by hiking.
