= Ambositra =

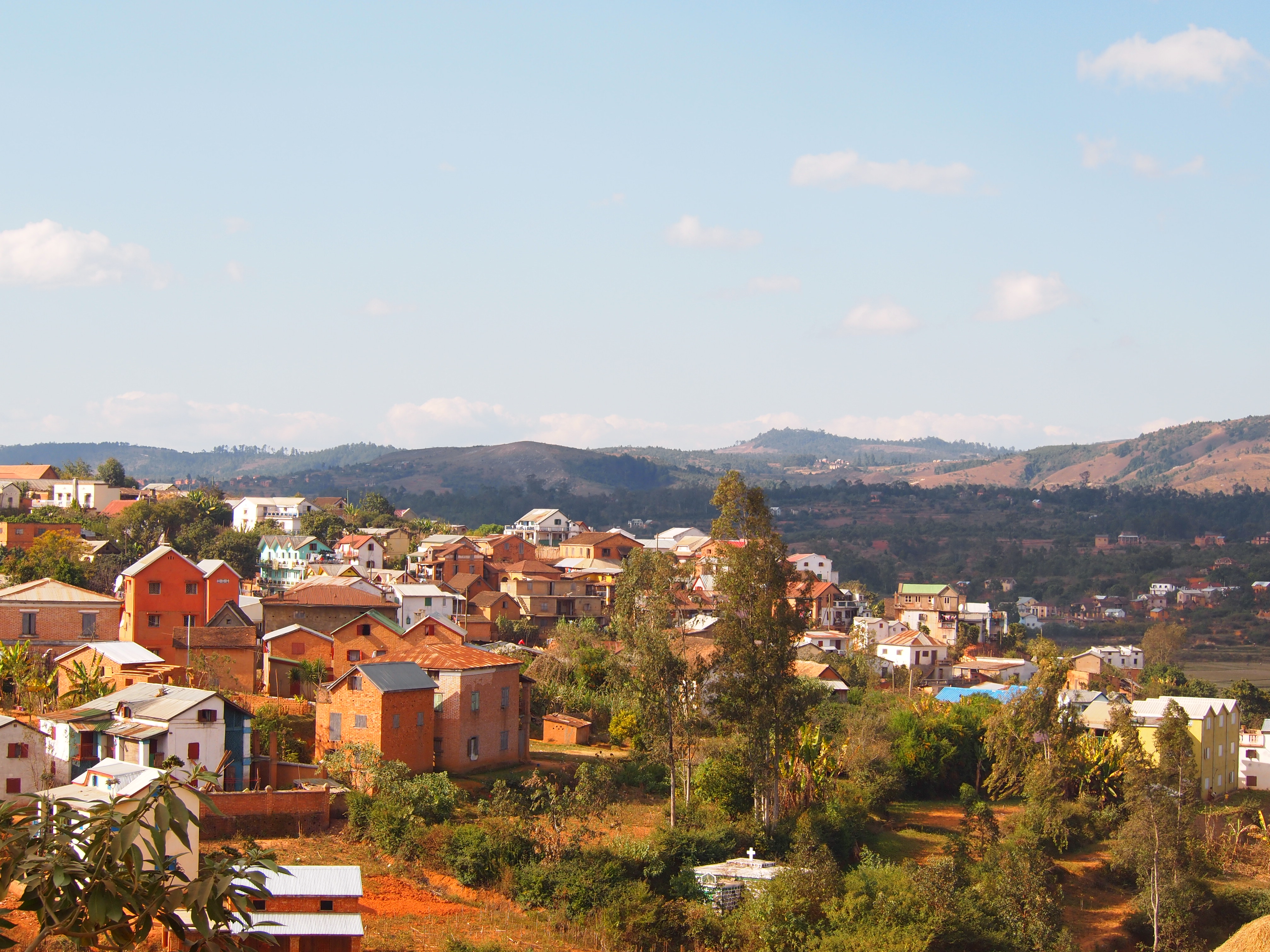
- View of Ambositra

- Location in Madagascar
- Coordinates: 20°31′0″S 47°15′0″E
- Country: Madagascar
- Region: Amoron'i Mania
- District: Ambositra

Area
  - Total: 15.2 km^{2} (5.9 sq mi)
- Elevation: 1,342 m (4,403 ft)

Population (2018 census)
  - Total: 41,078
  - Density: 2,700/km^{2} (7,000/sq mi)
- Postal code: 306

Ambositra [amˈbuɕʈʂə̥] is a city (commune urbaine) in central Madagascar.

Ambositra is the capital of the Amoron'i Mania region, and of Ambositra District.

== Geography ==
It is situated at the RN 7 (Antsirabe - Tulear) and the RN 41 to Fandriana. It is situated 255 km south of the country's capital Antananarivo.

== Rivers ==
Ambositra is situated at the Isaha River, an affluent of the Mania.

== Religion ==
The Diocese of Ambositra is seated in the town (Cathedral of the Immaculate Heart of Mary), led by Bishop Fidelis Rakotonarivo.

== Arts and crafts ==
Ambositra is the centre of Madagascar's wood-carving industry due to the presence of the Zafimaniry, a subgroup of the Betsileo people. There are many shops selling wooden household equipment, boxes, chessboards and figurines. Various woodworking firms and workshops can be visited. In Madagascar, Ambositra has received the nickname "Capital of Woodworking (Capitale du travail sur bois)".

== Sights ==
The Cathedral of the Immaculate Heart of Mary (Cathédrale du Cœur Immaculé de Marie) on the Rue de Commerce street, is one of the largest churches in Madagascar. It was built in the first quarter of the 20th century. Various colonial houses with carved wooden balconies are preserved in the city centre. A memorial from 1947 dedicated to the victims of the Malagasy Uprising is located on the Rue de Commerce close to the representative Grand Hotel dating from 1912. Nuns sell cheese, honey and jam in a red-brick Benedictine Monastery founded in 1934.

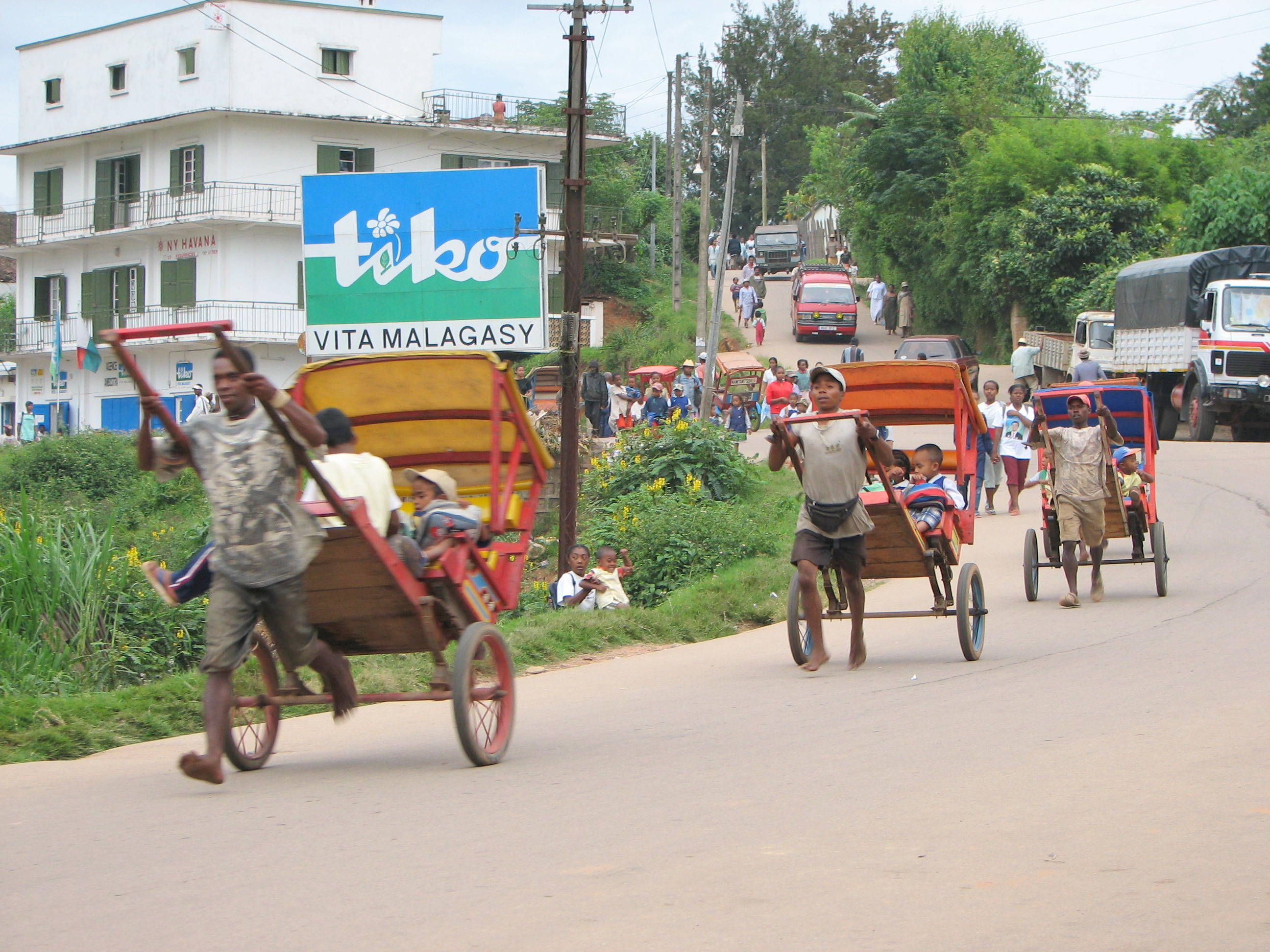
Typical street scene in Ambositra

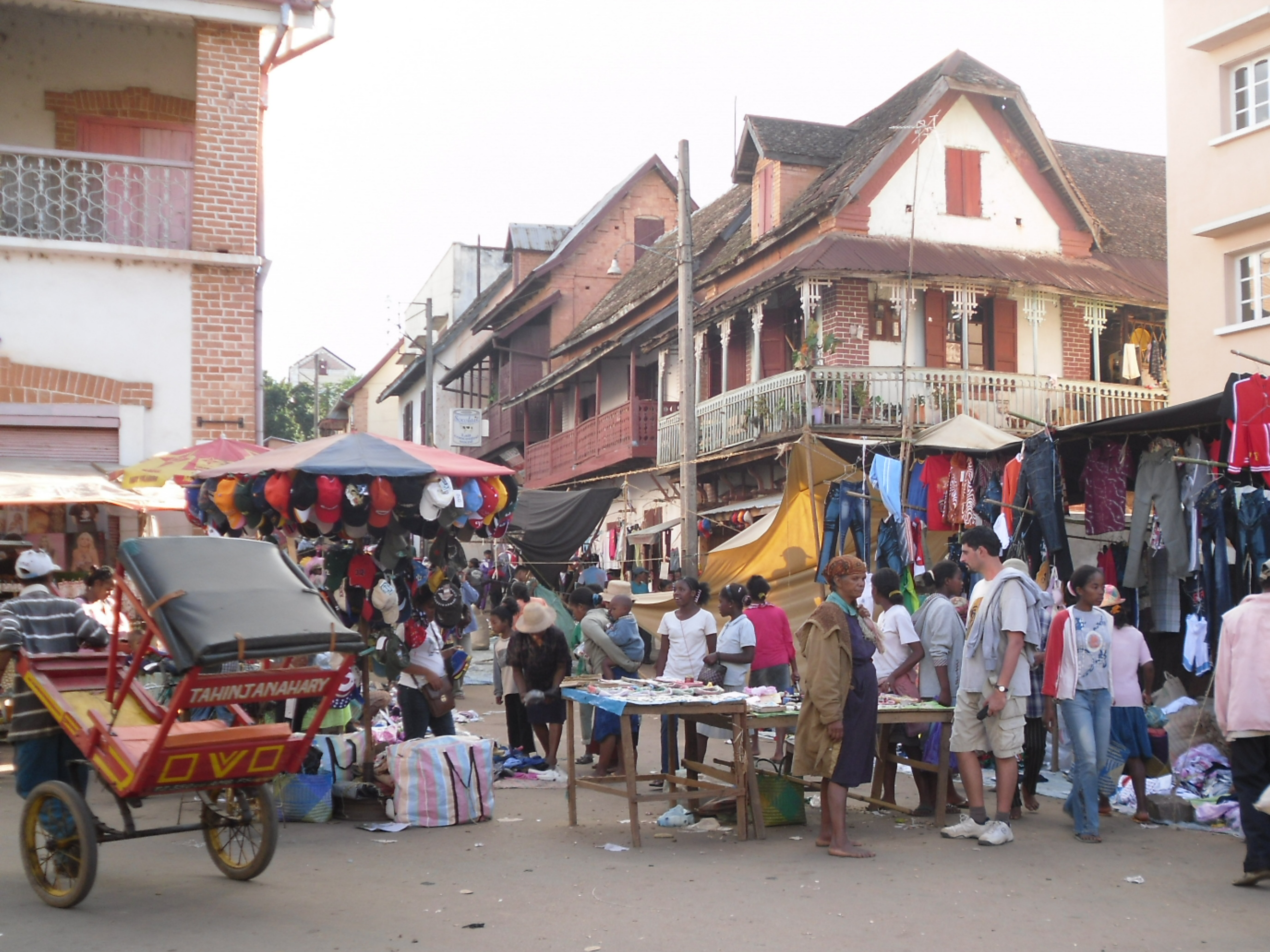
Market scene in Ambositra

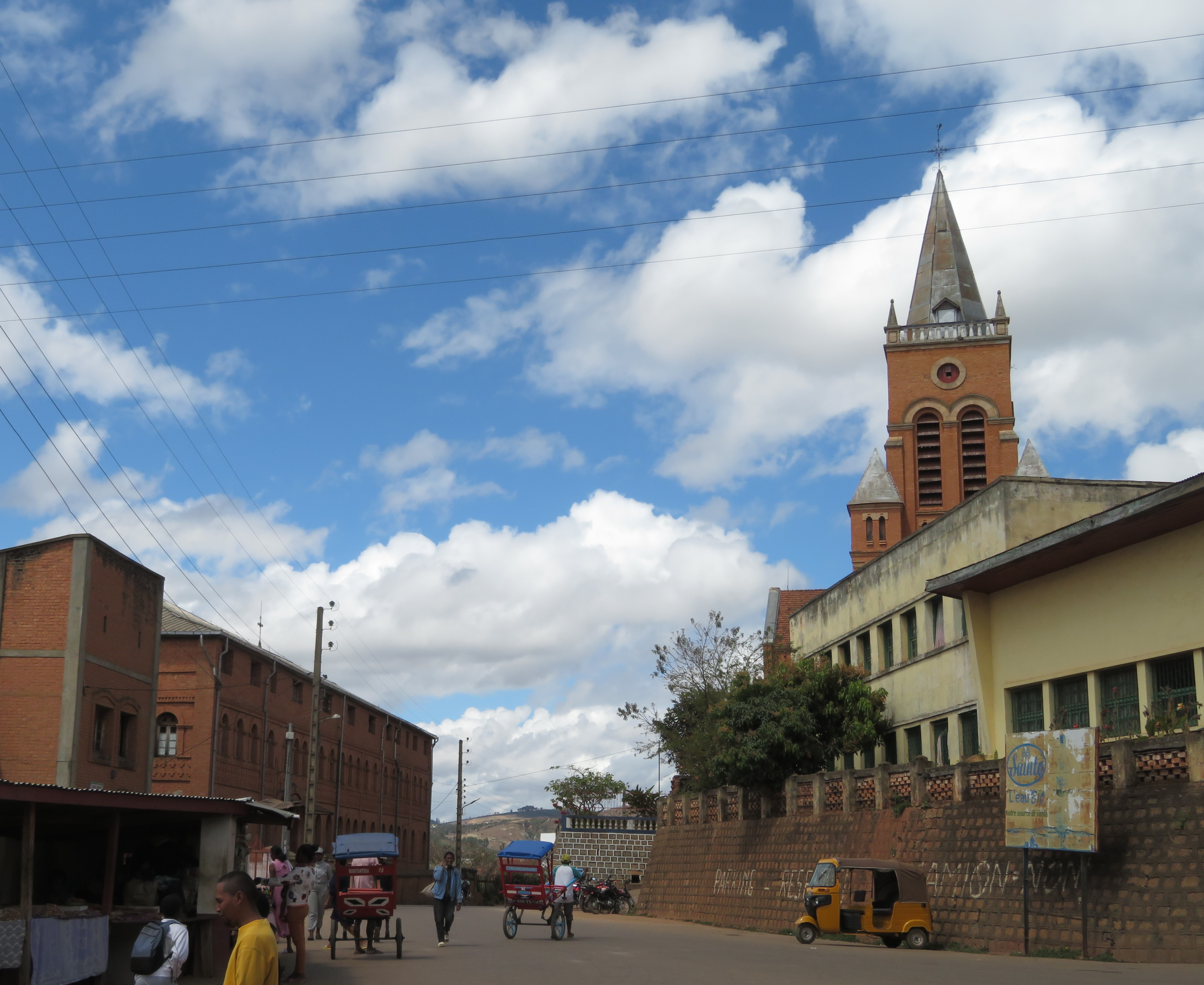
Cathedral of the Immaculate Heart of Mary

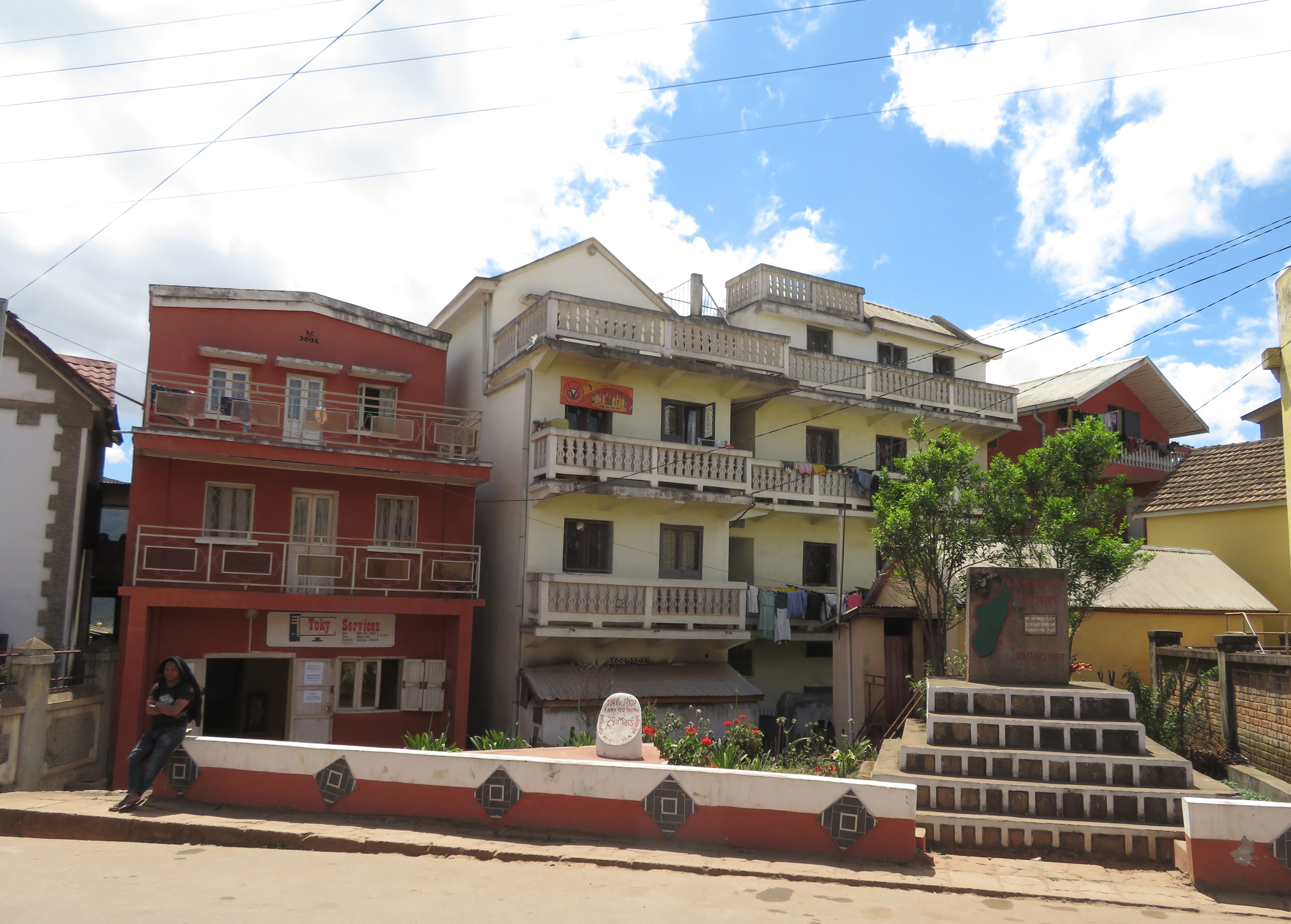
Monument of Malagasy Uprising (1947)

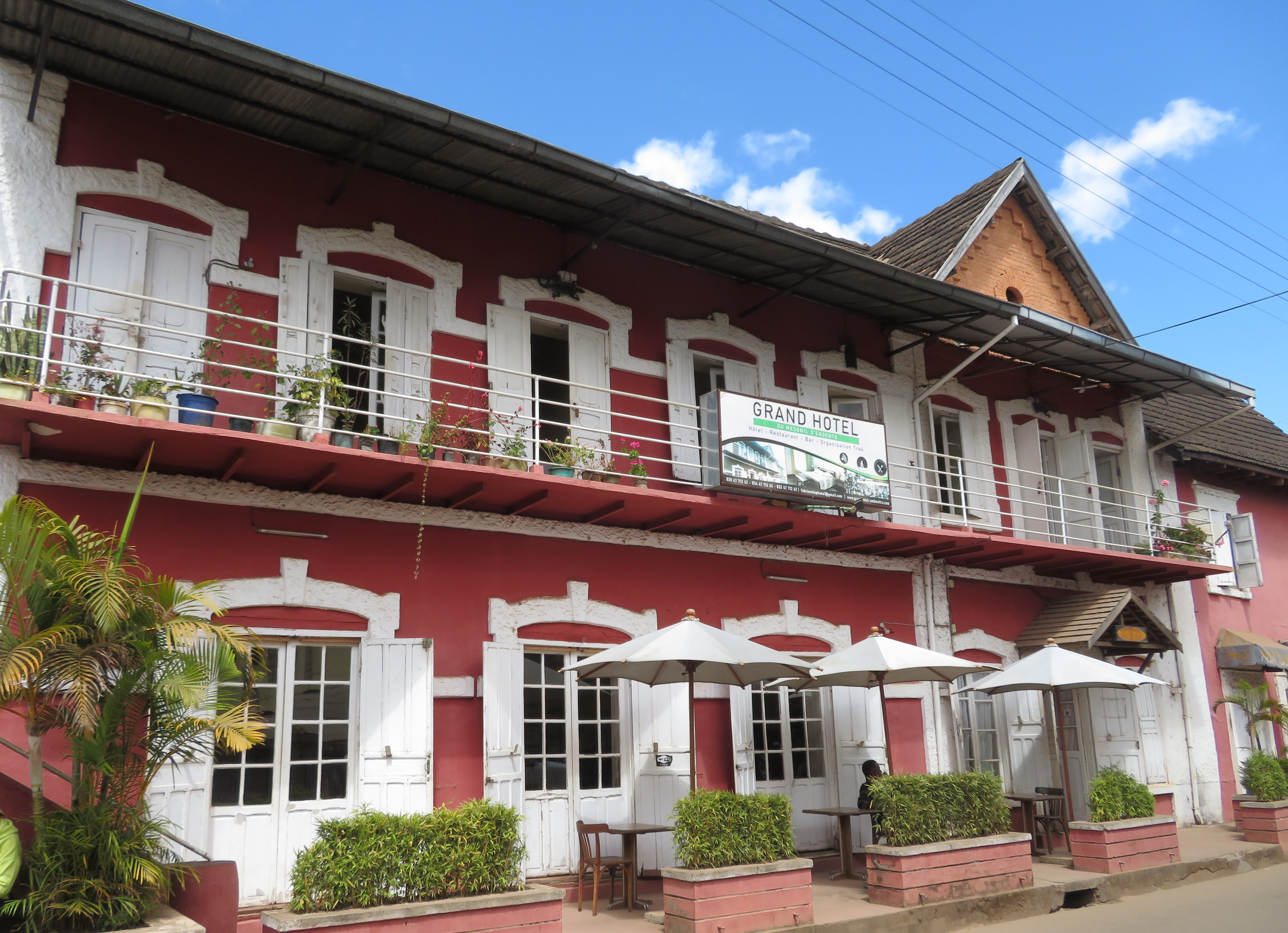
Colonial architecture: Grand Hotel

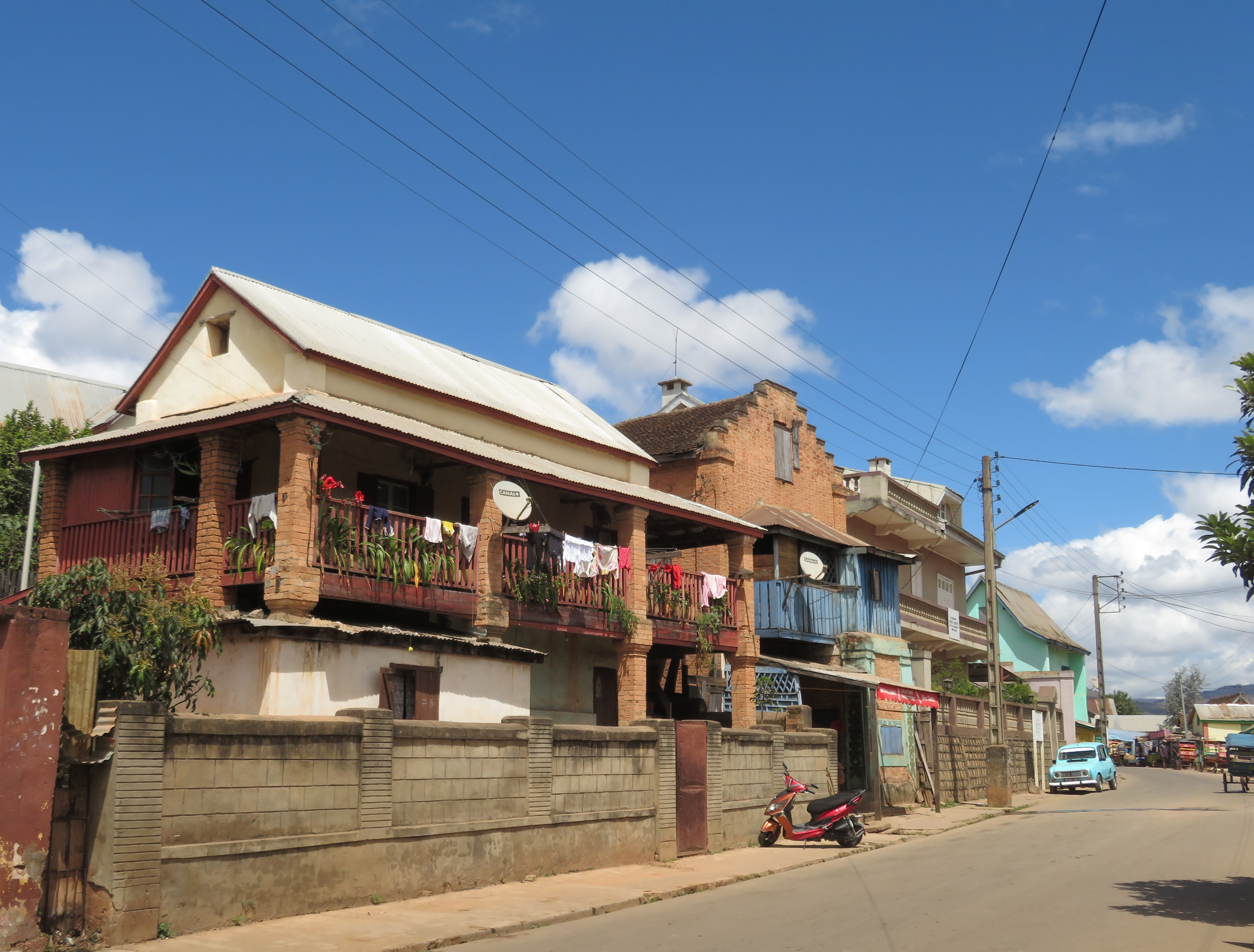
Colonial architecture

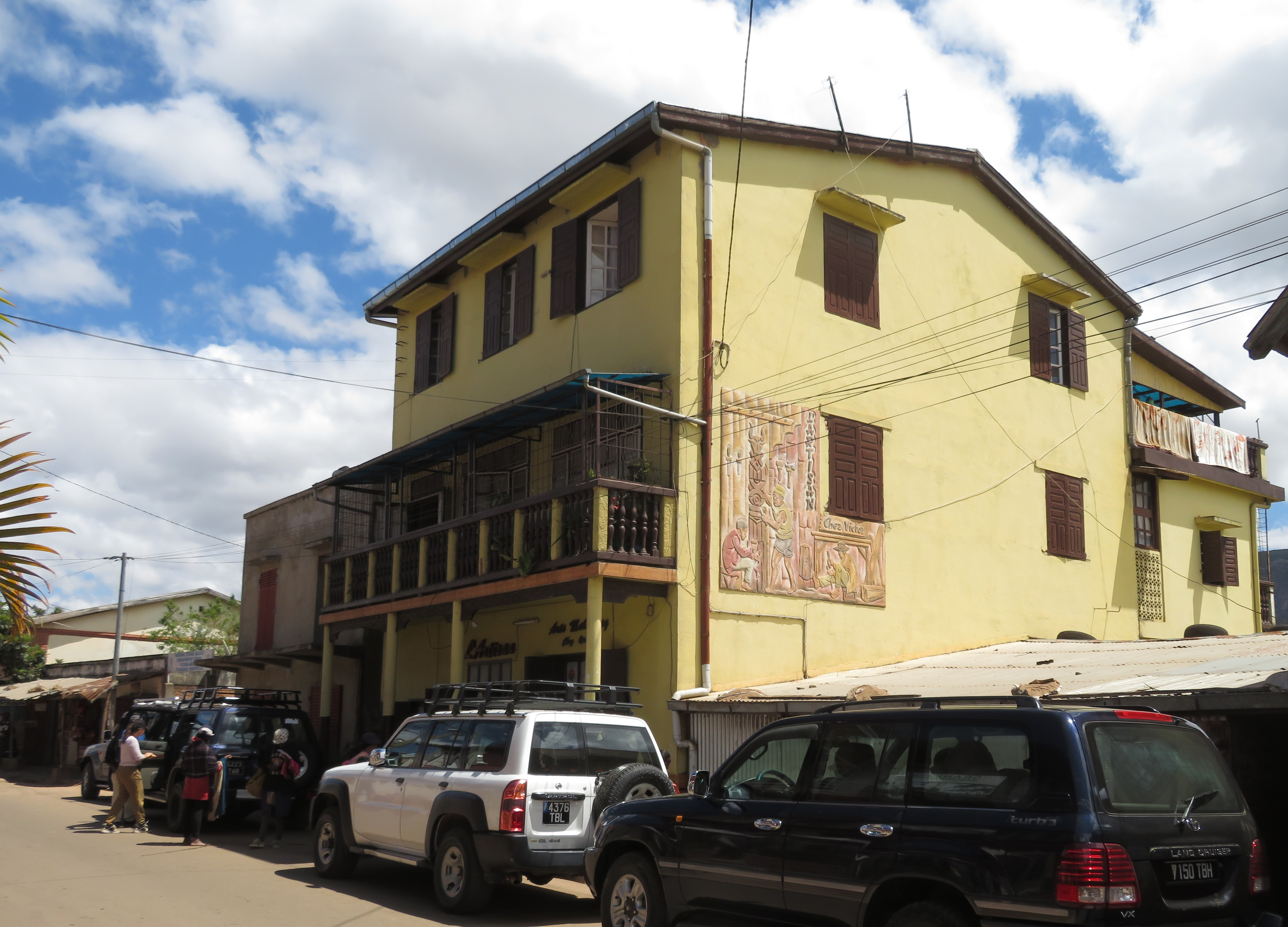
Woodworking plant
