= Amoron'i Mania =

Coordinates: 20.1°S 46.4°E

Amoron'i Mania Region
- Region
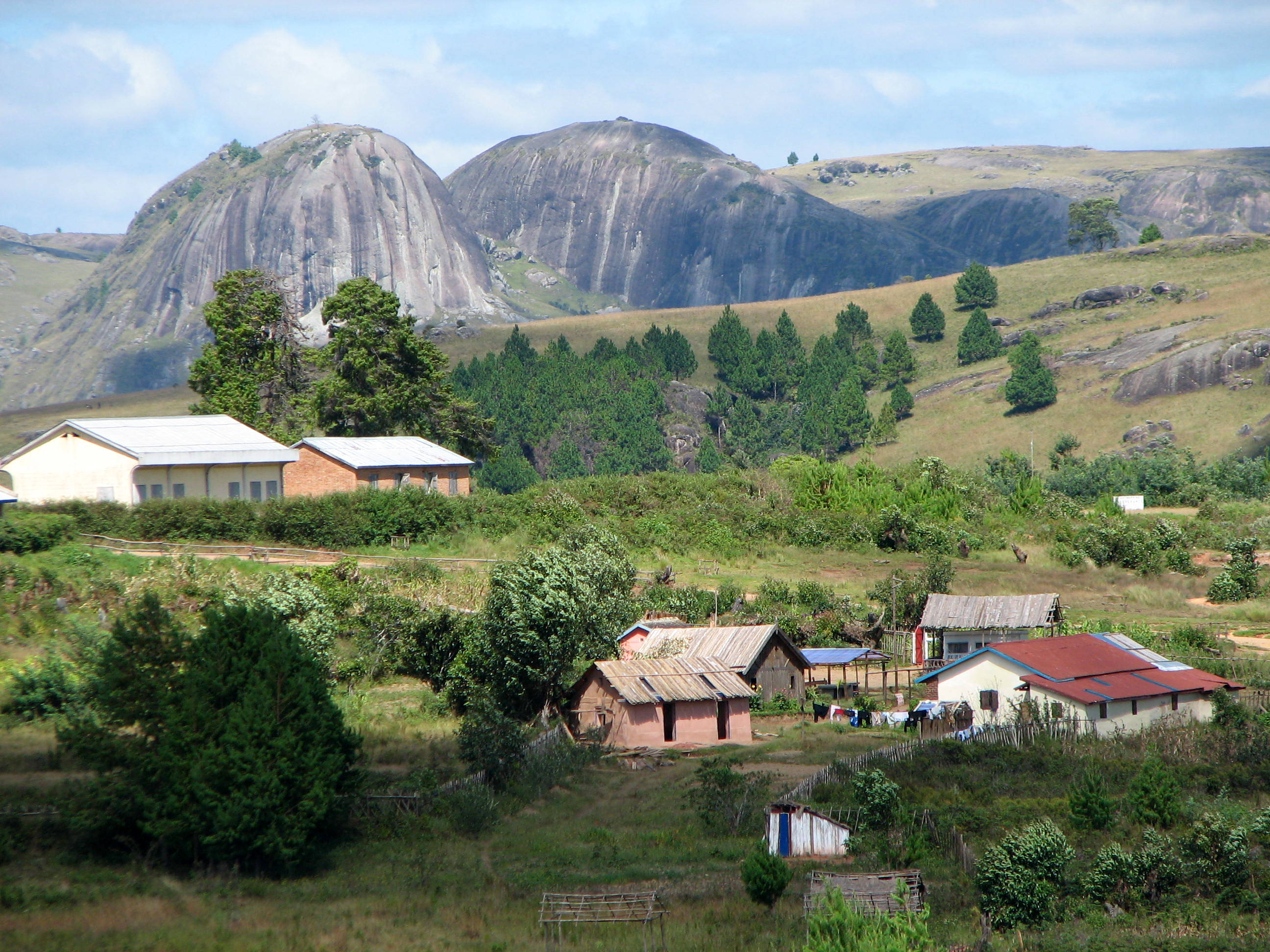
- Antoetra

- Location in Madagascar
- Country: Madagascar
- Capital: Ambositra

Government
  - Gouvernor: Aline Mamiarisoa

Area
  - Total: 16,141 km^{2} (6,232 sq mi)

Population (2018)
  - Total: 833,919
  - Density: 51.665/km^{2} (133.81/sq mi)
- Time zone: UTC3 (EAT)
- HDI (2018): 0.528 low · 9th of 22

Amoron'i Mania (Translated: Banks of the Mania) is a region in central Madagascar bordering Vakinankaratra Region in north, Atsinanana in northeast, Fitovinany in southeast, Haute Matsiatra in south, Atsimo-Andrefana in southwest and Menabe in west.

The capital of the region is Ambositra, and the population was 833,919 in 2018. The area of the region is 16,141 km^{2} (6,232 sq mi).

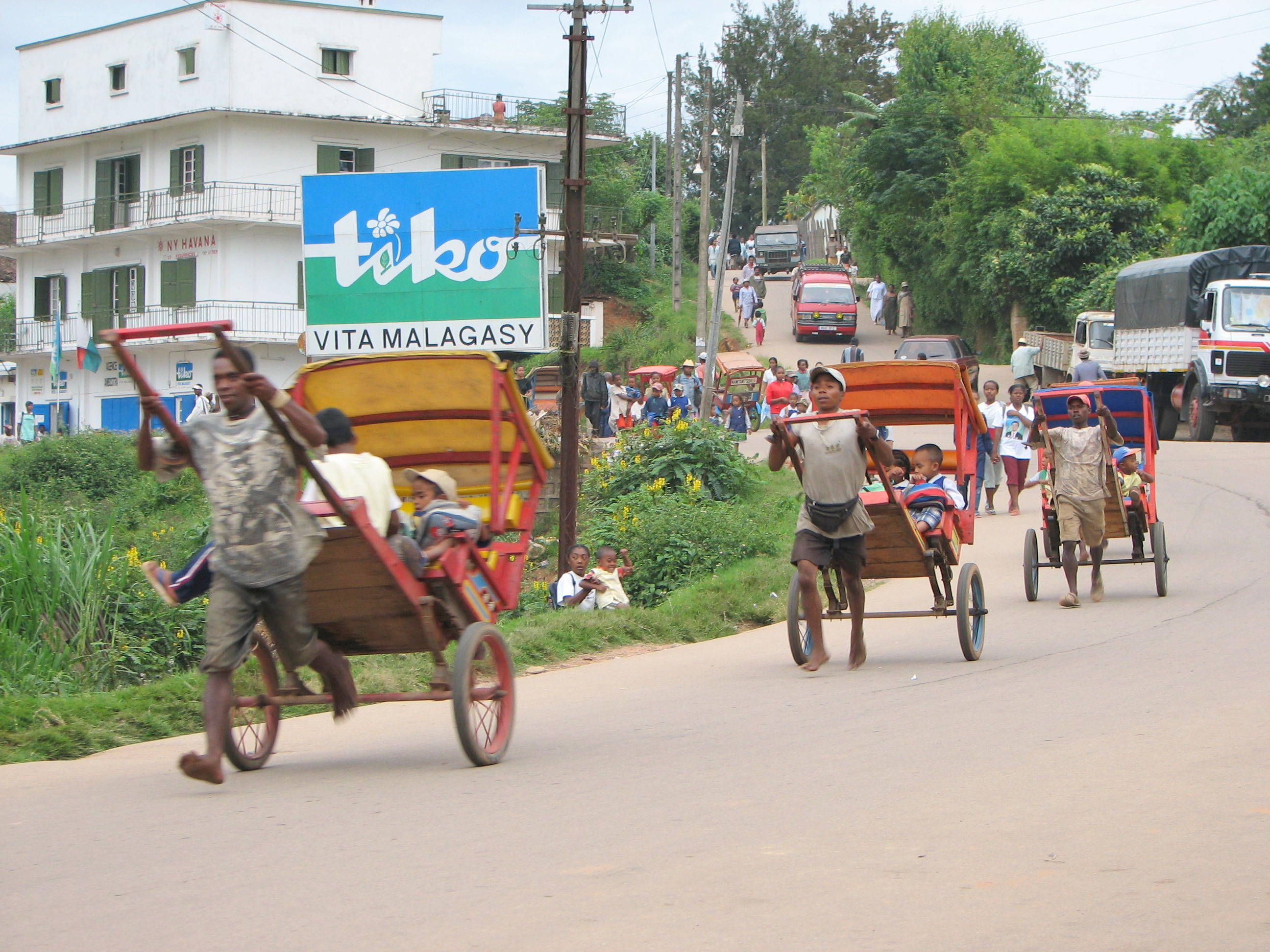
Ambositra

== Administrative divisions ==
Amoron'i Mania Region is divided into four districts, which are sub-divided into 53 communes.

- Ambatofinandrahana District - 9 communes
- Ambositra District - 21 communes
- Fandriana District - 13 communes
- Manandriana District - 10 communes

== Protected areas ==
- Part of Fandriana-Vondrozo Corridor
- Part of Marolambo National Park
- Itremo New Protected Area
